= Australian non-residential architectural styles =

Australian non-residential architectural styles are a set of Australian architectural styles that apply to buildings used for purposes other than residence and have been around only since the first colonial government buildings of early European settlement of Australia in 1788.

Their distribution follows closely the establishment and growth of the different colonies of Australia, in that the earliest colonial buildings can be found in New South Wales and Tasmania.

The classifications set out below are derived from a leading Australian text.

== Old Colonial Period (1788–c. 1840) ==
- Old Colonial Georgian; Old Colonial Regency; Old Colonial Grecian; Old Colonial Gothic Picturesque

=== Old Colonial Georgian ===
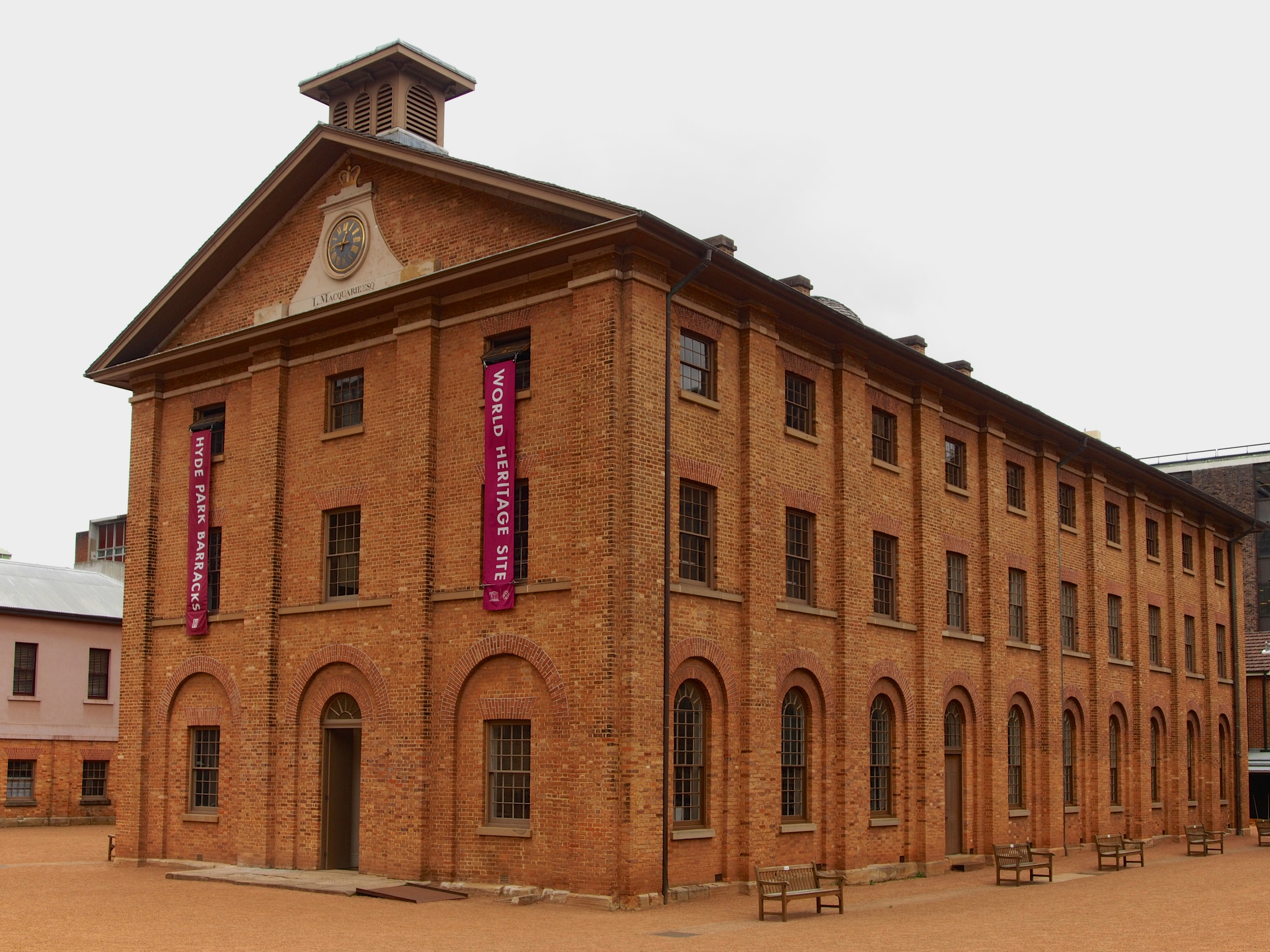
Hyde Park Barracks, Sydney; completed in 1819; designed by Francis Greenway.

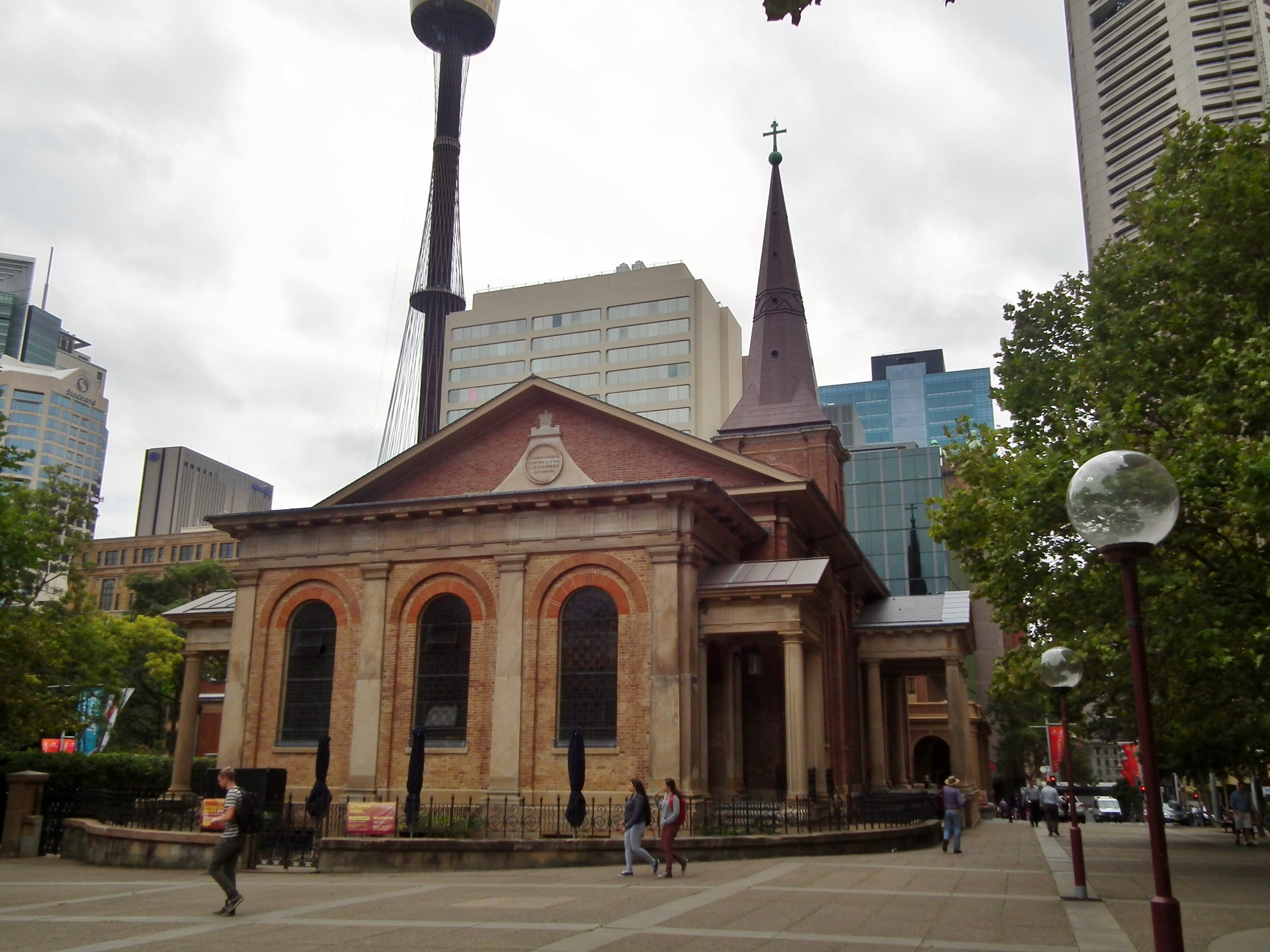
St James' Church, Sydney completed 1824.

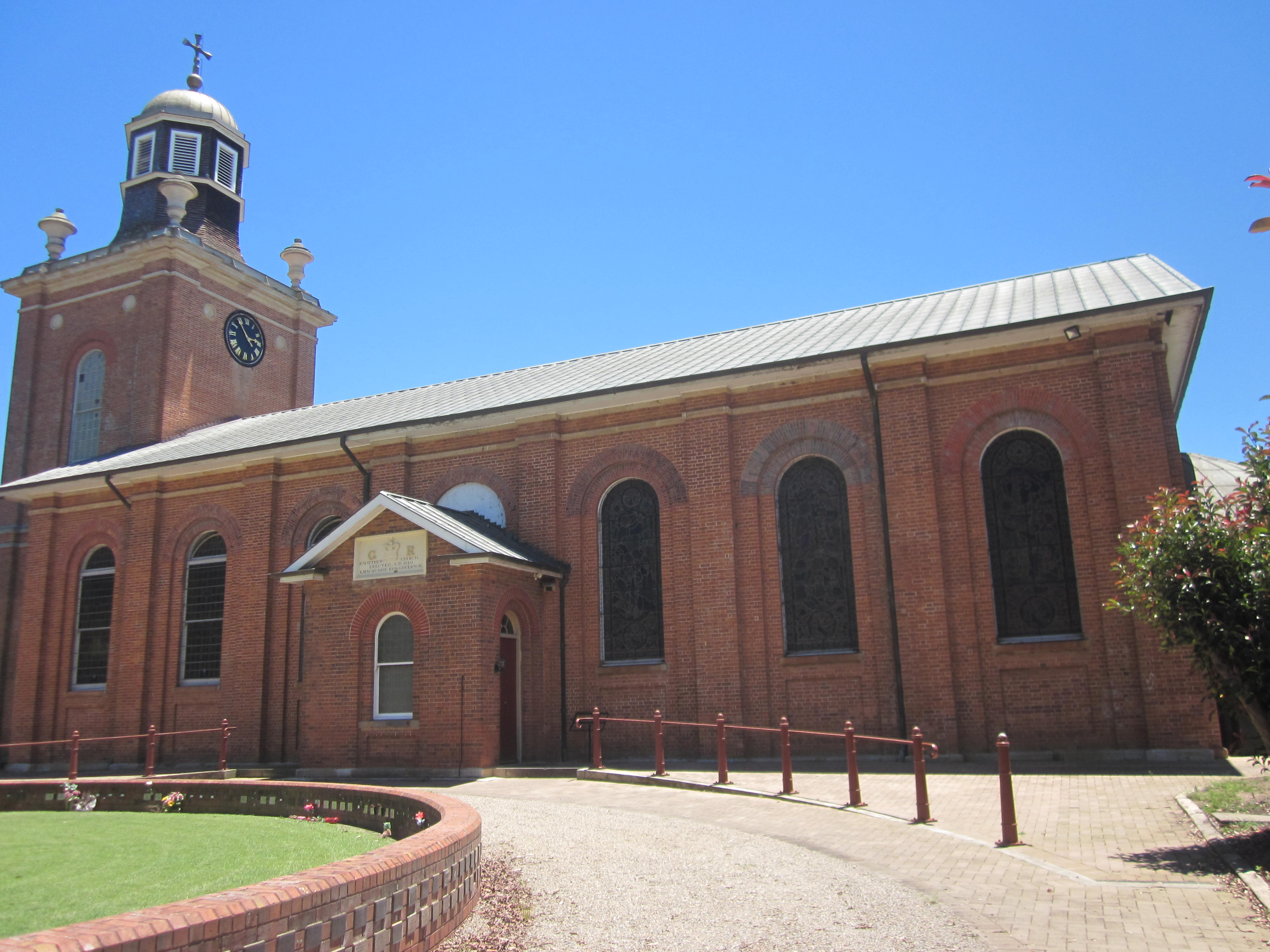
St Matthew's Anglican Church, Windsor. Completed 1820.

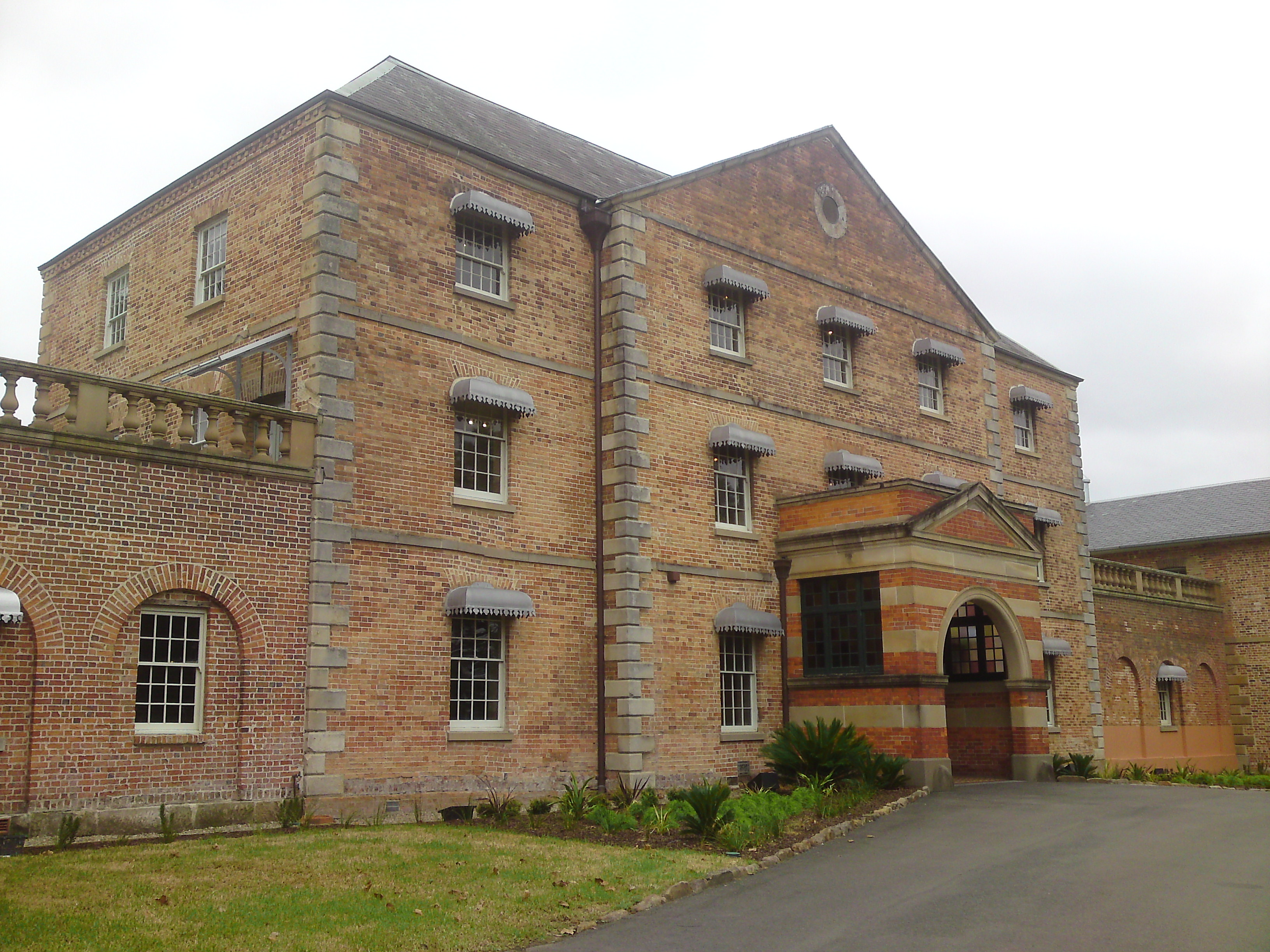
Former Female Orphan School; Parramatta. Completed 1818.

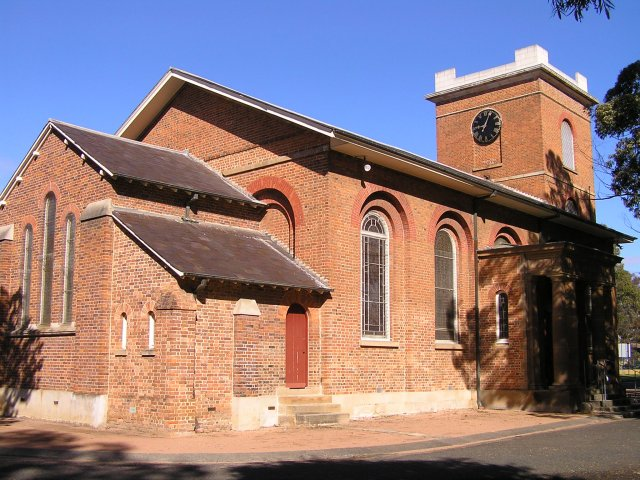
St Luke's Anglican Church, Liverpool. Completed 1820; designed by Francis Greenway.

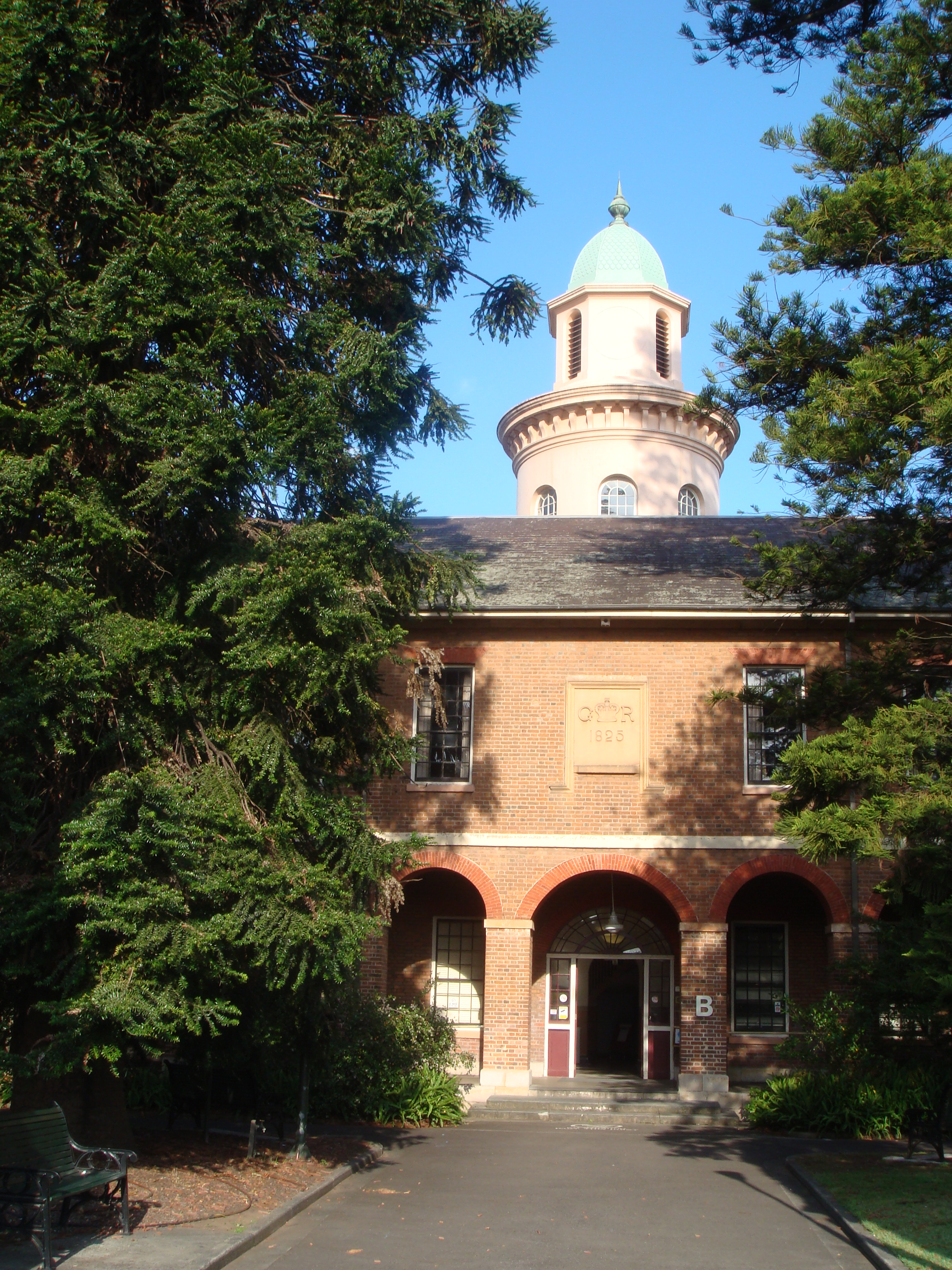
Old Liverpool Hospital (main block). Completed 1822; designed by Francis Greenway.

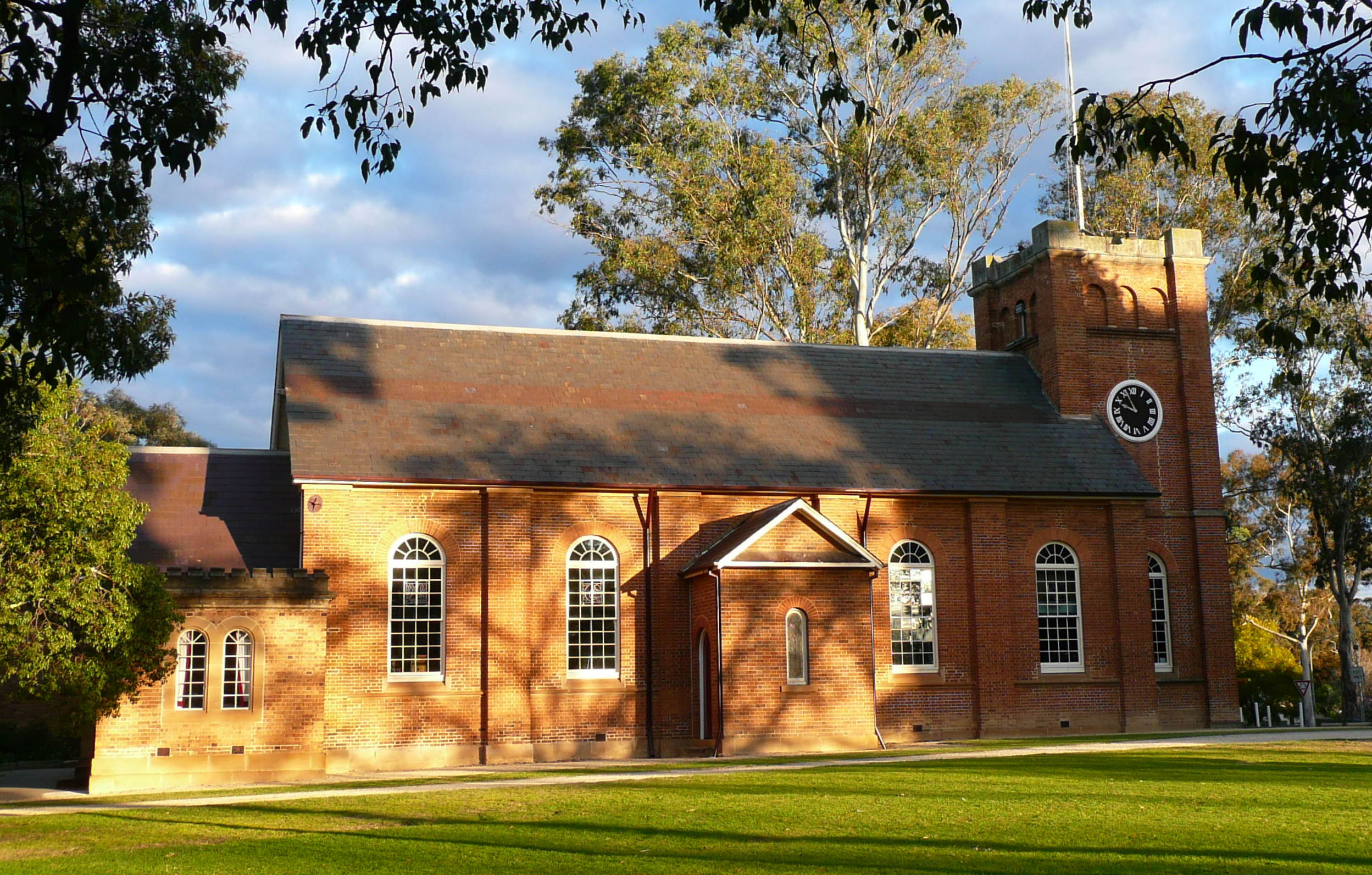
St Peter's Anglican Church, Campbelltown; completed 1823.

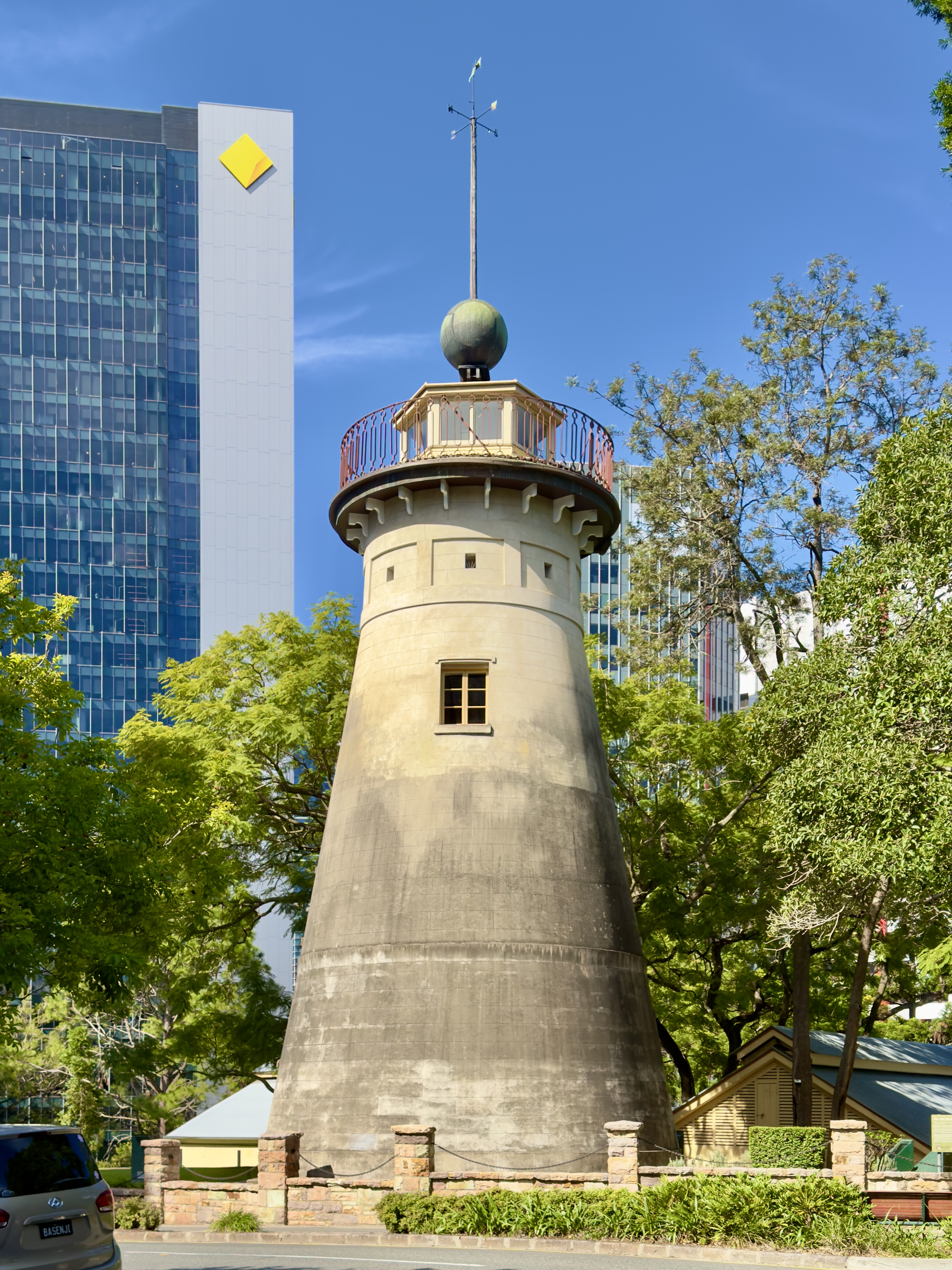
The Old Windmill, Brisbane; completed 1824; Brisbane's oldest building

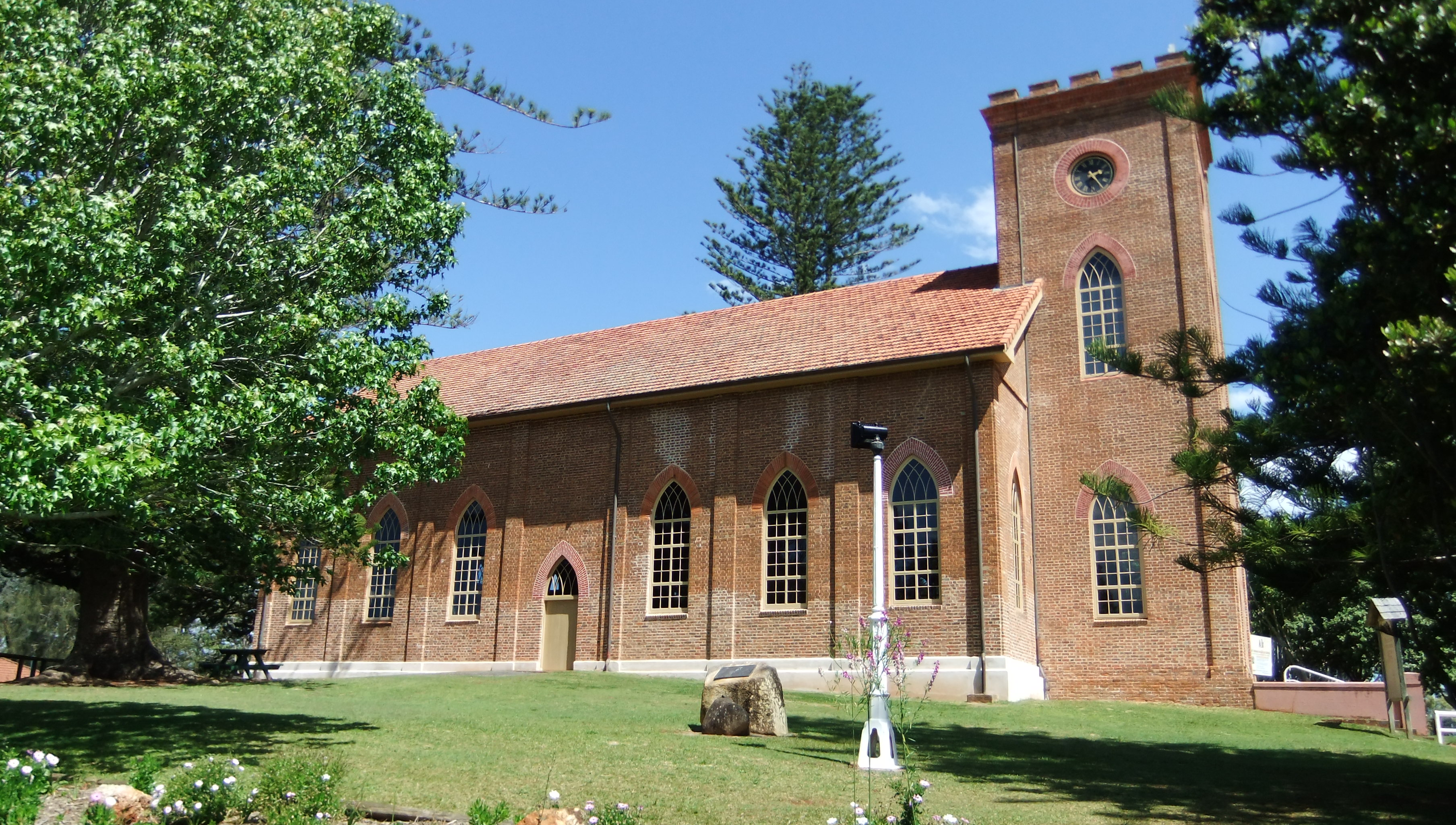
St Thomas' Anglican Church, Port Macquarie. 1827

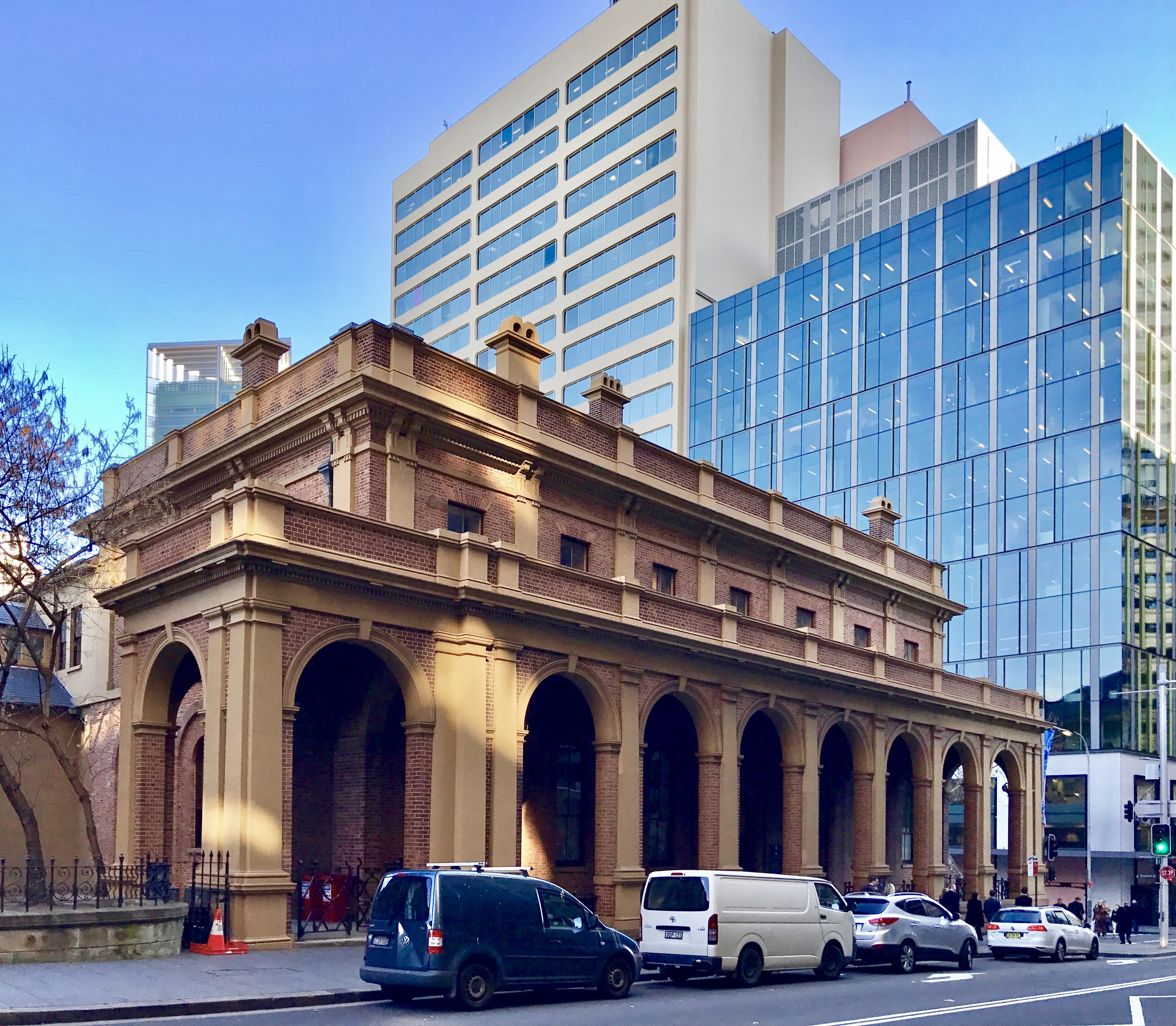
Greenway Wing (Supreme Court of New South Wales) Sydney; completed 1828; designed by Francis Greenway

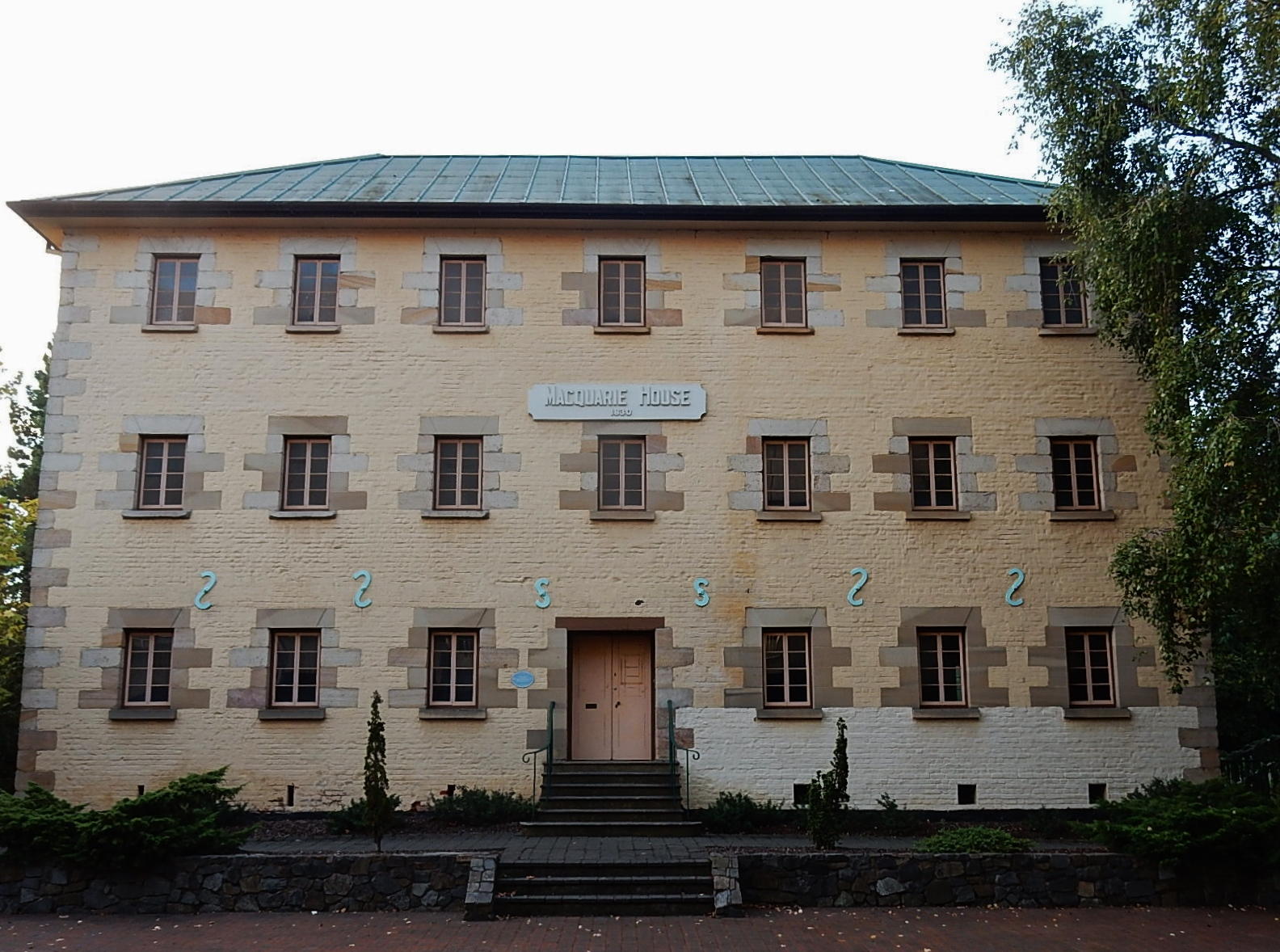
Macquarie House, Launceston. Completed 1830.

=== Old Colonial Regency ===
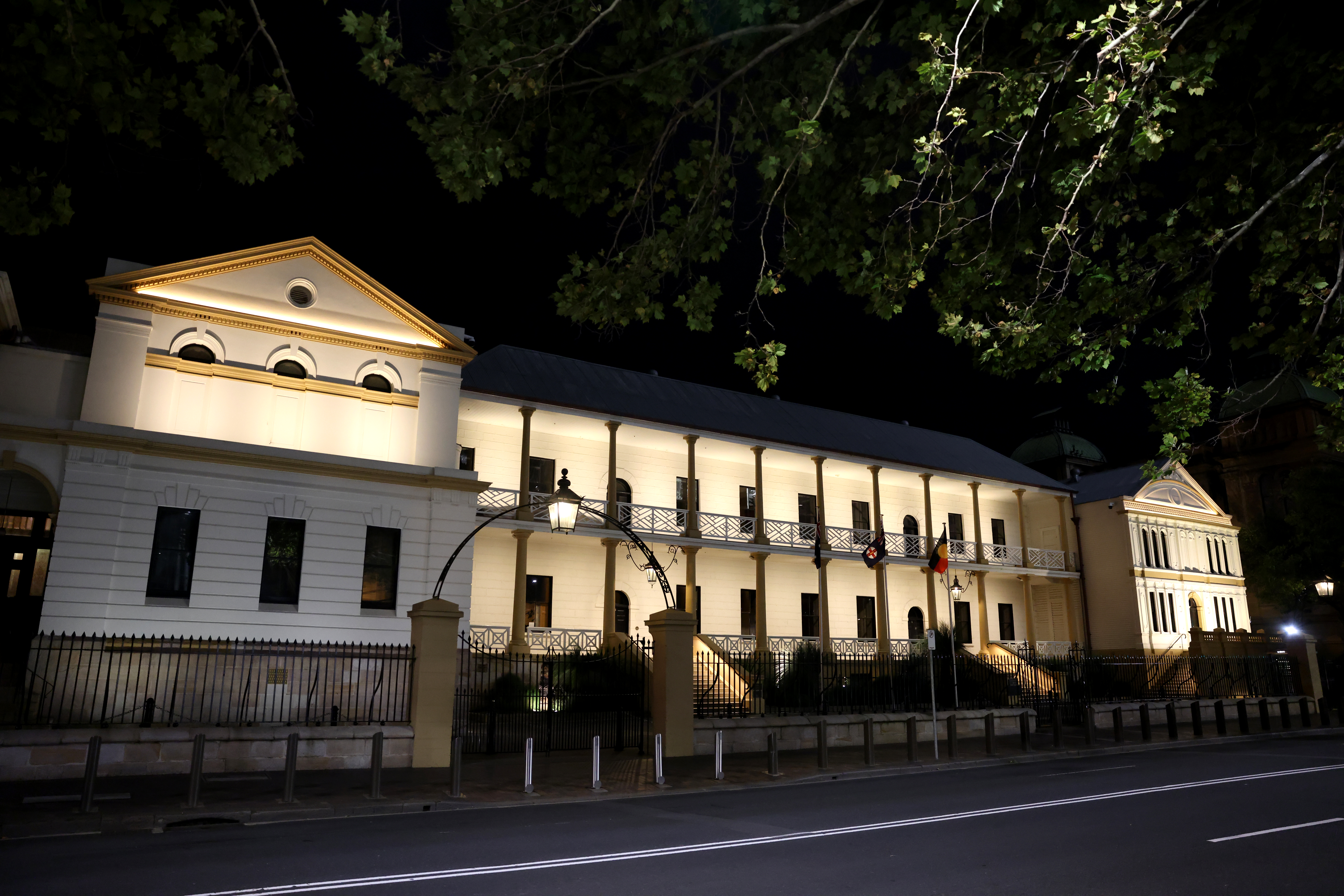
Parliament House, Sydney, Completed 1816

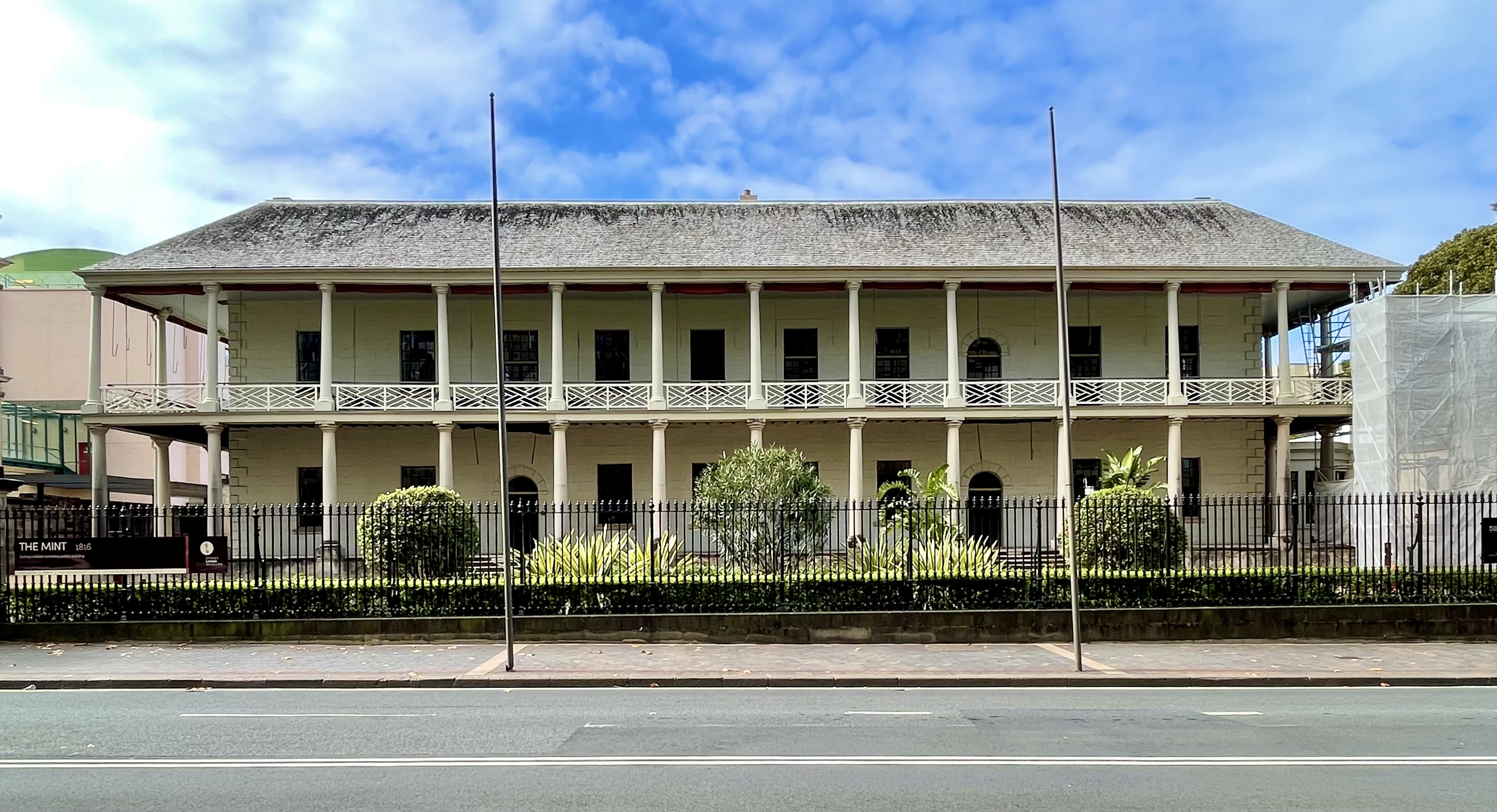
Sydney Mint, Completed 1816

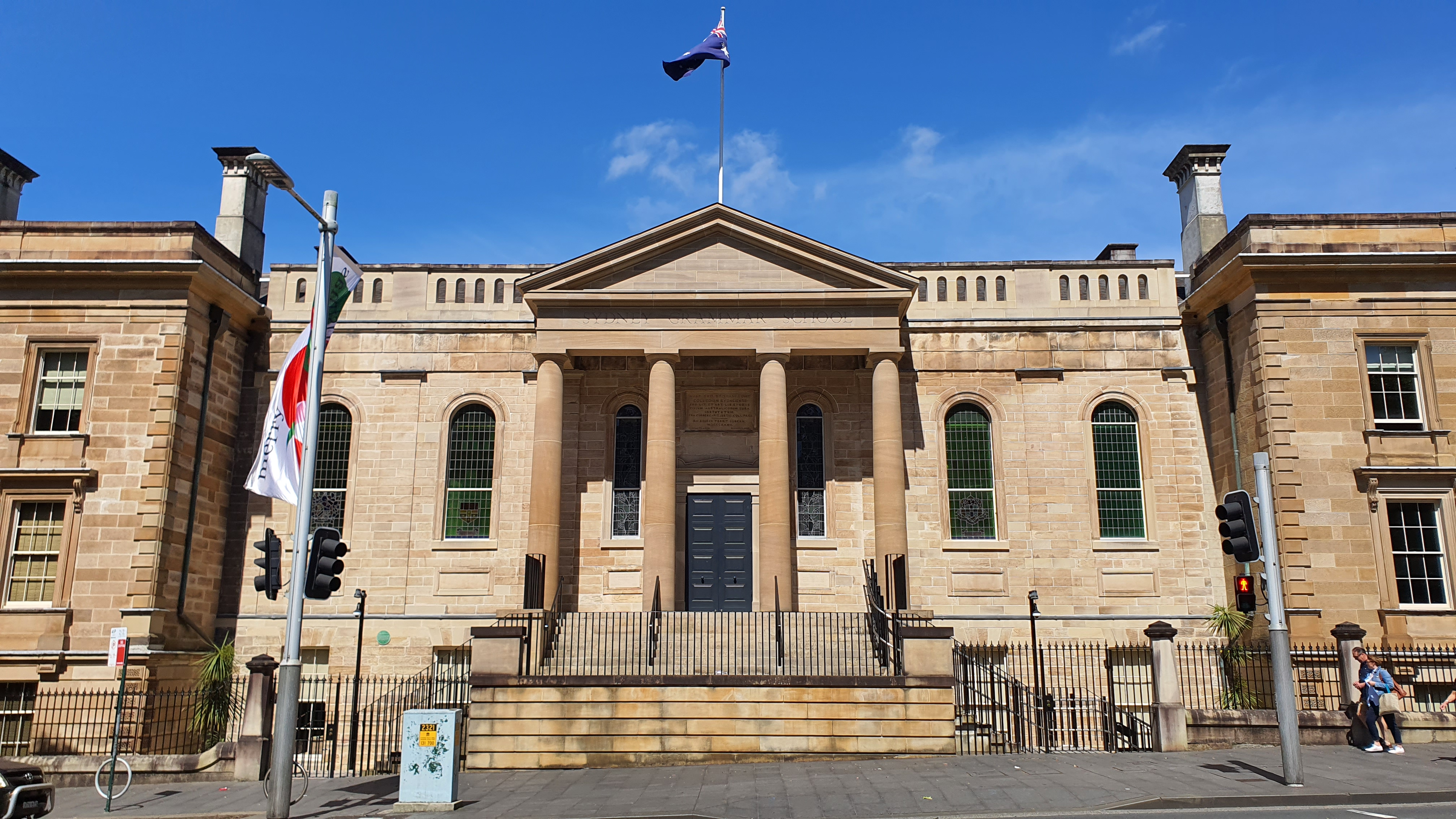
Sydney Grammar School, Completed 1835. Northern and southern extensions completed in the 1850s

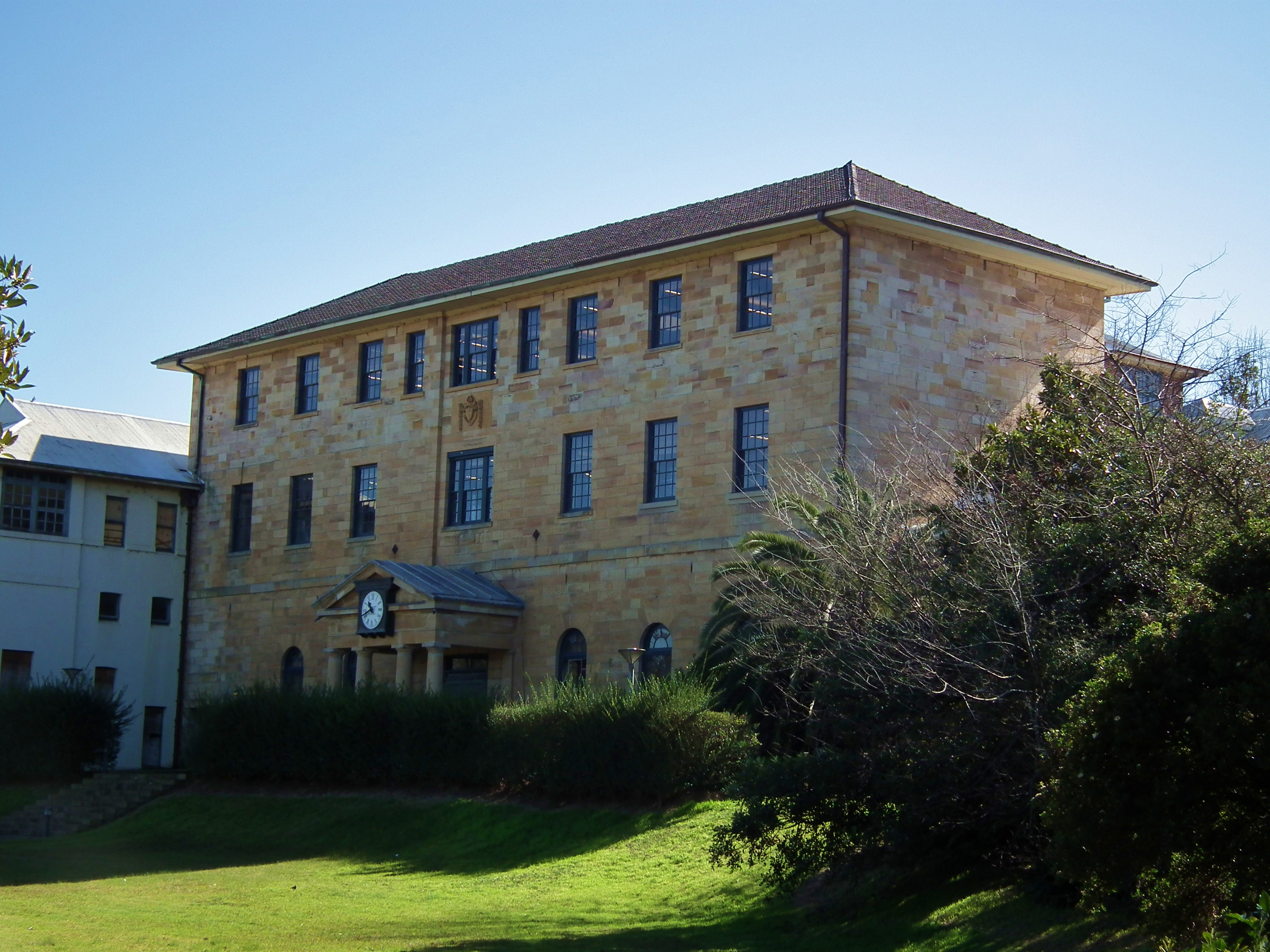
Old King's School, Parramatta. Completed 1833

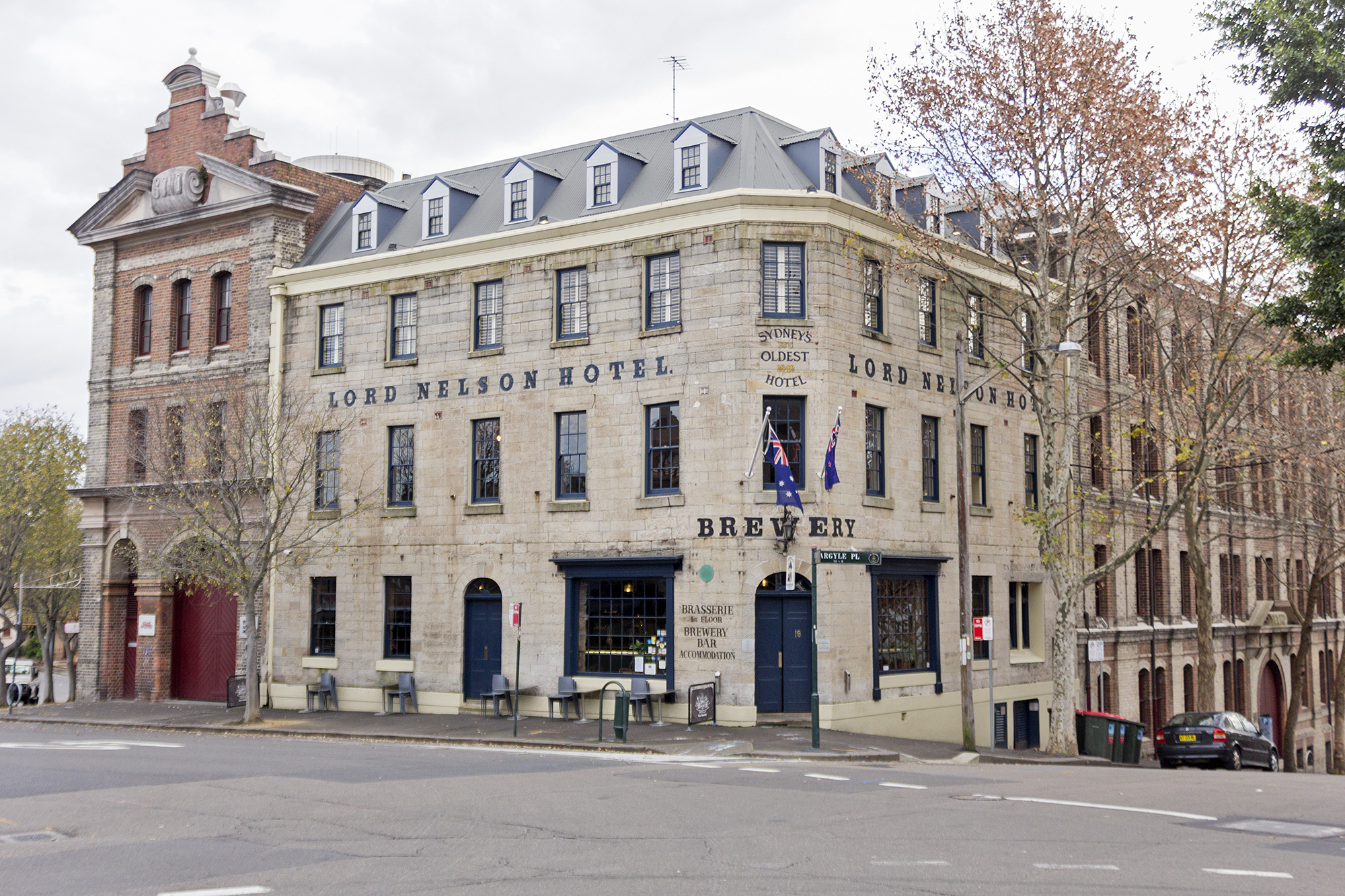
Lord Nelson Hotel, Millers Point, Sydney, Completed 1835.

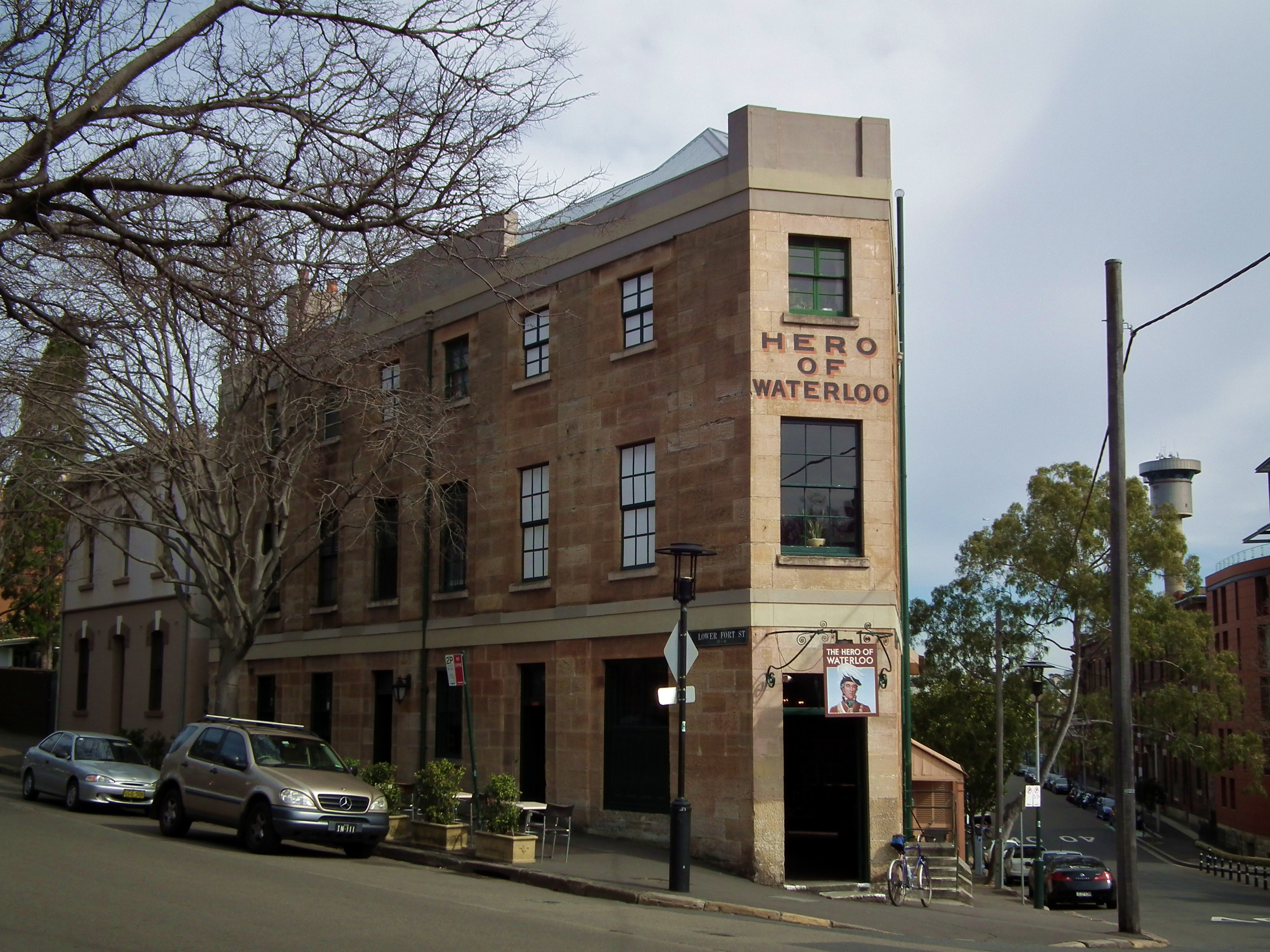
Hero of Waterloo Hotel, Millers Point, completed 1844

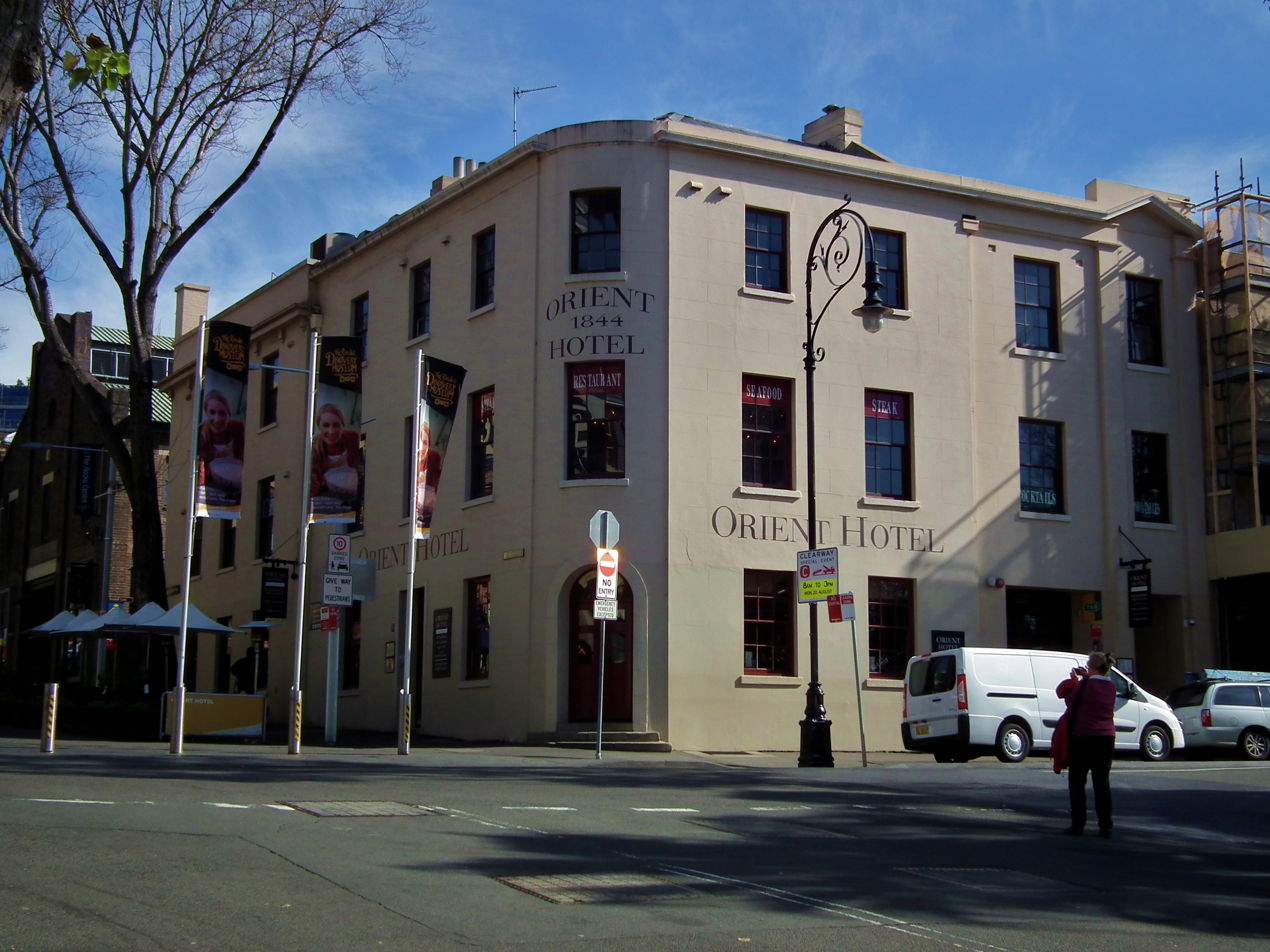
Orient Hotel, The Rocks, Completed 1844.

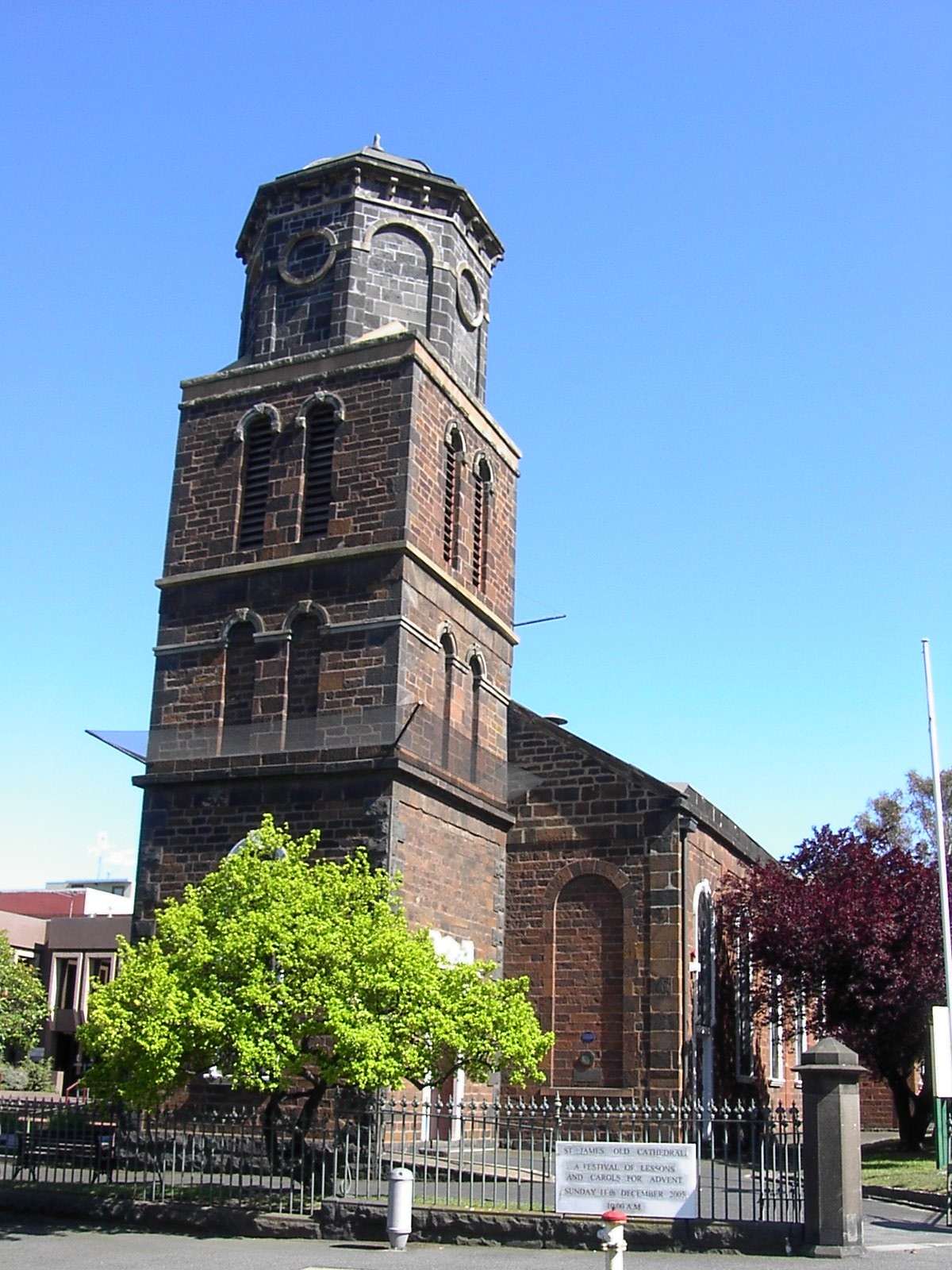
St James Old Cathedral. King Street, Melbourne, 1839–1849, resited 1914. One of Melbourne's oldest surviving buildings.

=== Early Colonial Classical ===
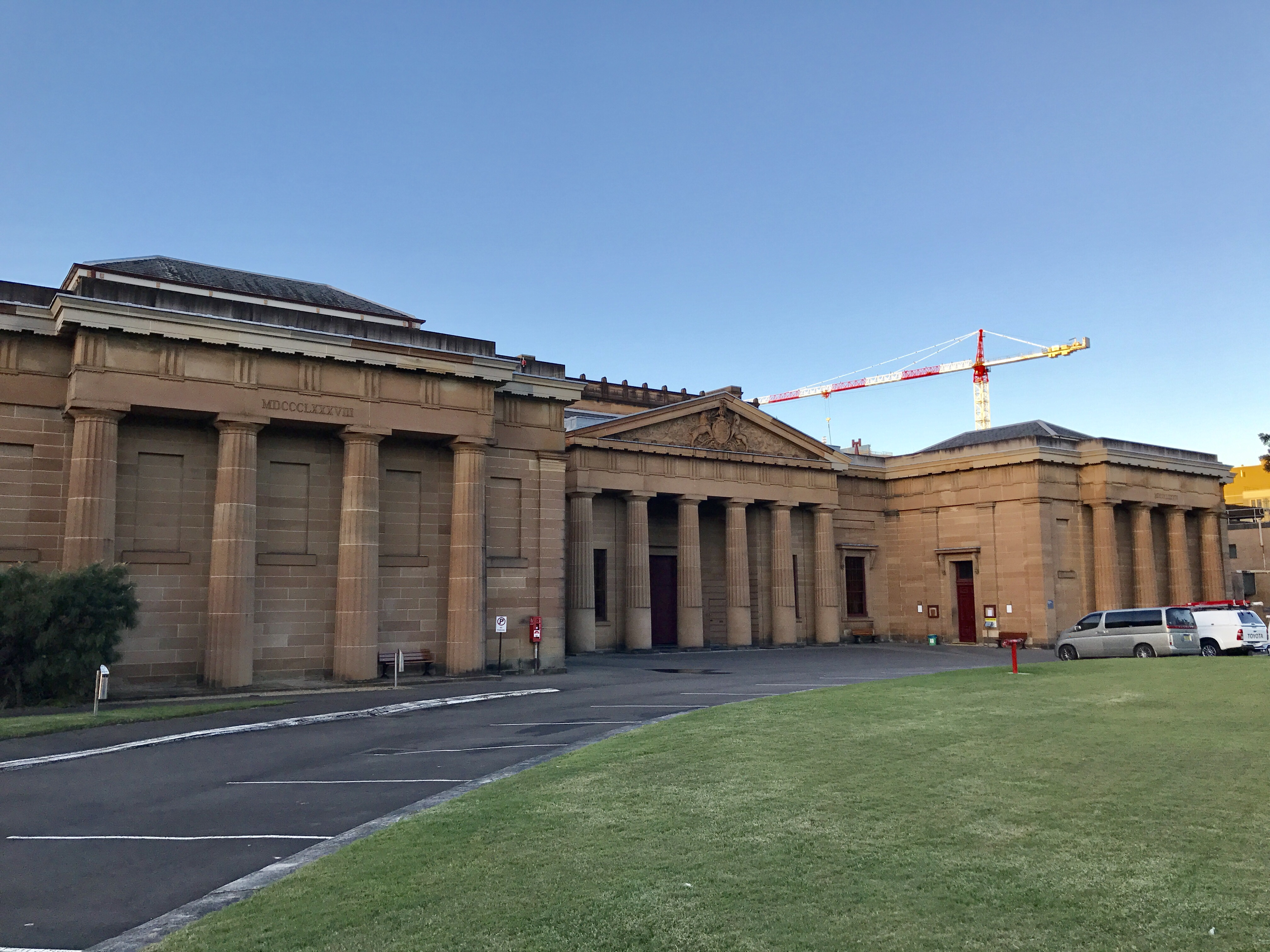
Darlinghurst Courthouse, Taylor Square. Completed 1844.

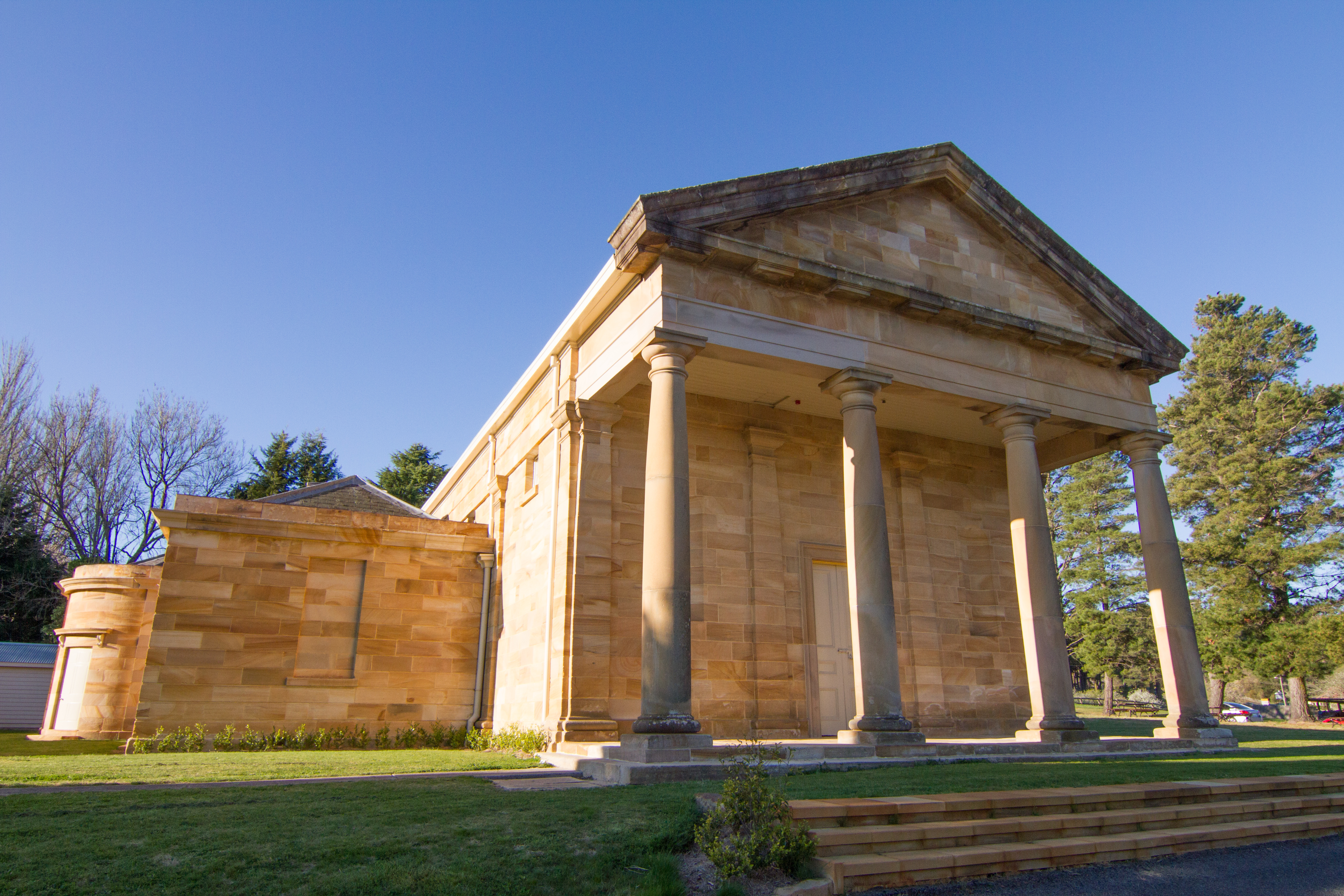
Berrima Courthouse, Berrima. Completed in 1838.

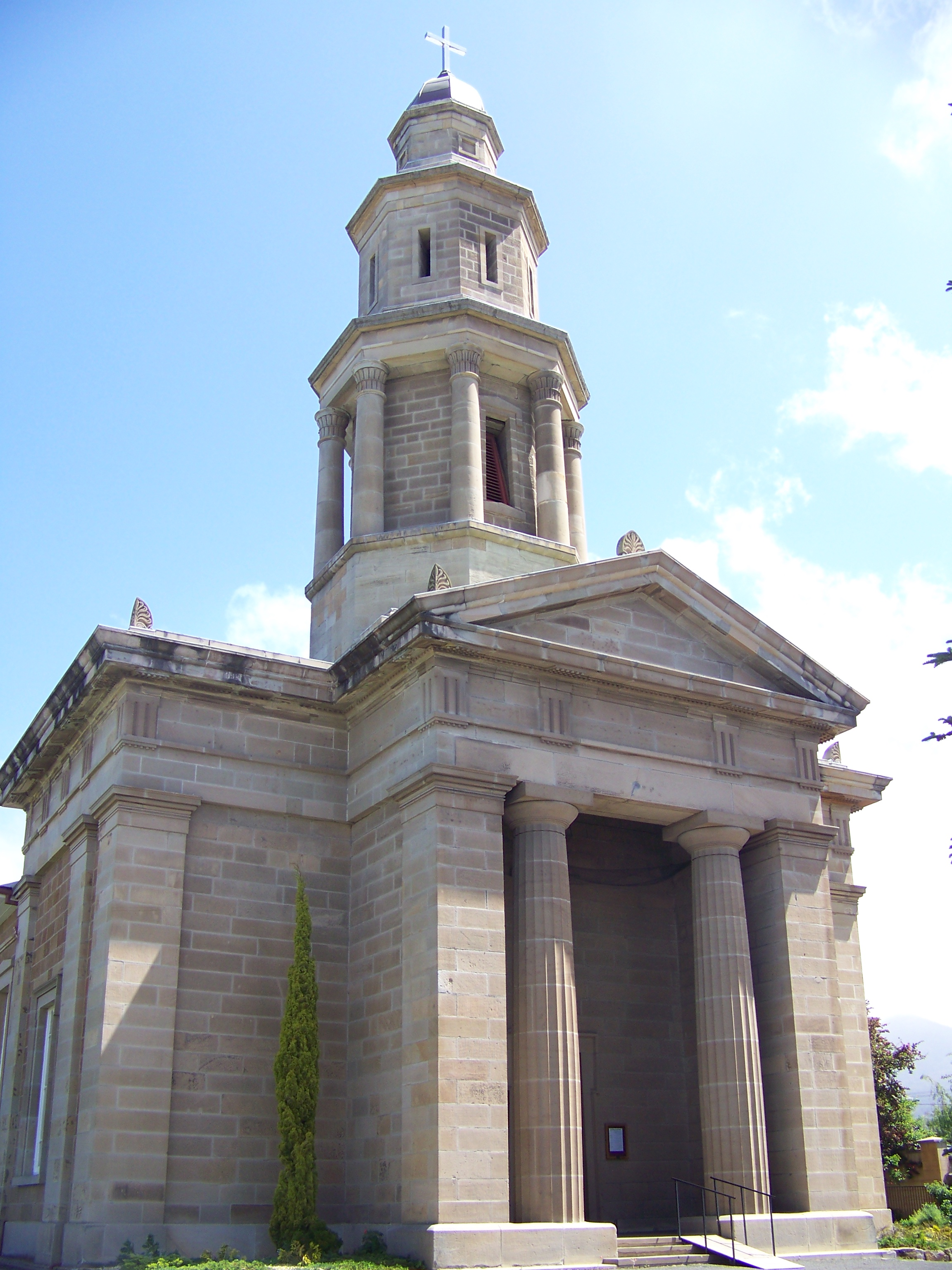
St George's Anglican Church, Battery Point; completed 1836; steeple and portico from 1841.

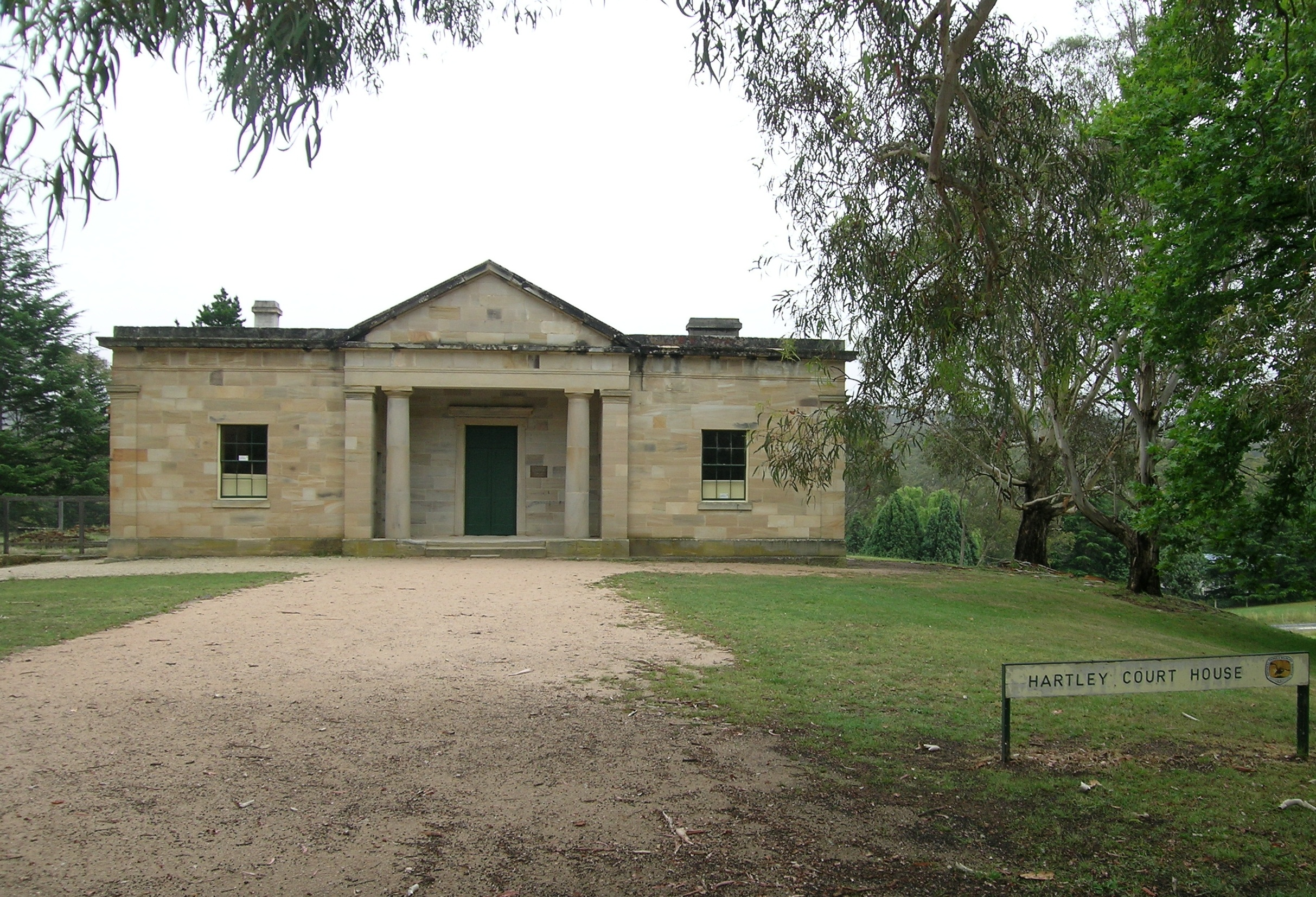
Hartley Courthouse, Hartley; completed 1836.

=== Early Colonial Gothic Picturesque ===
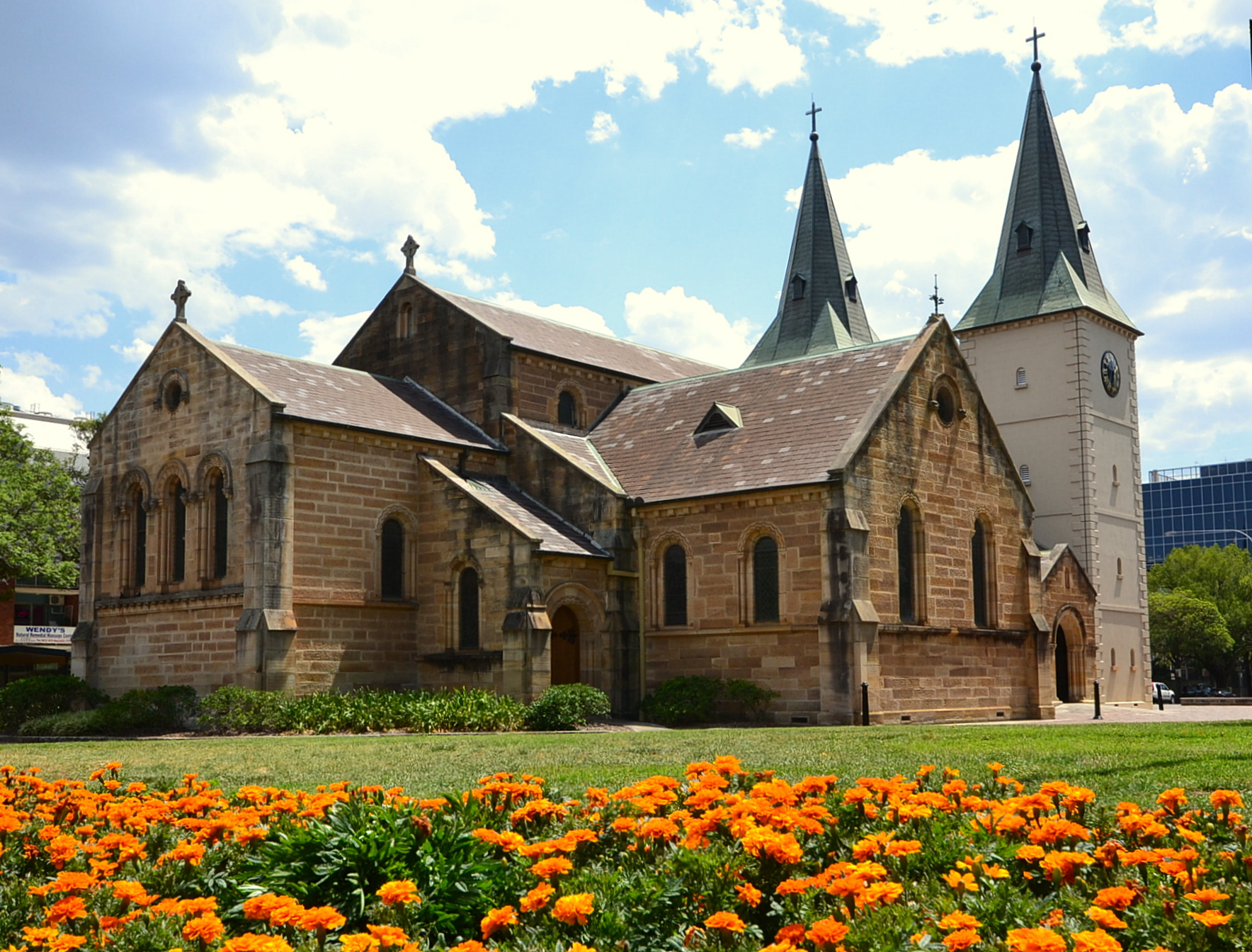
St John's Cathedral, Parramatta. Completed in 1802, towers added in 1819

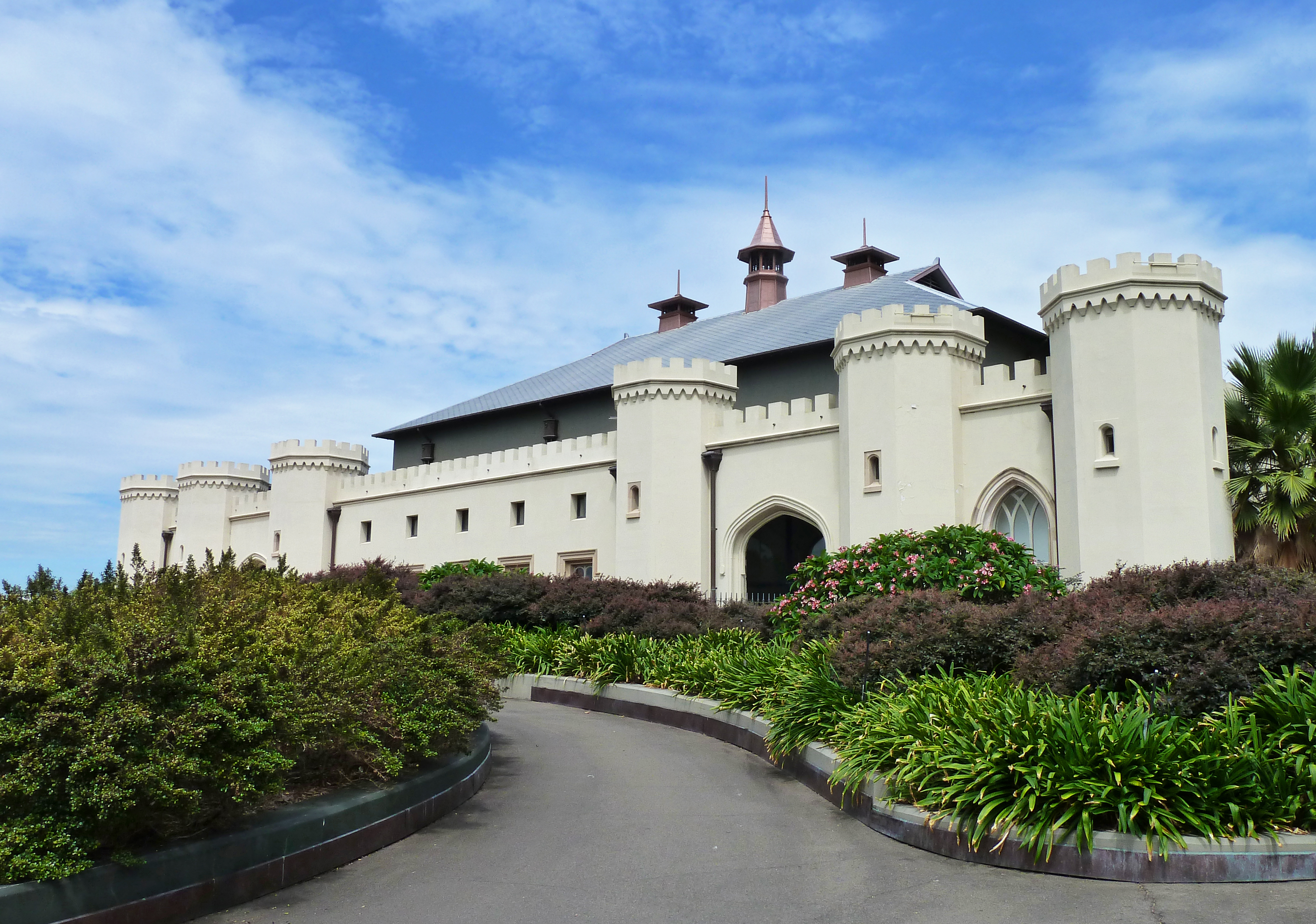
The former government stables, now the Sydney Conservatorium of Music; completed in 1821.

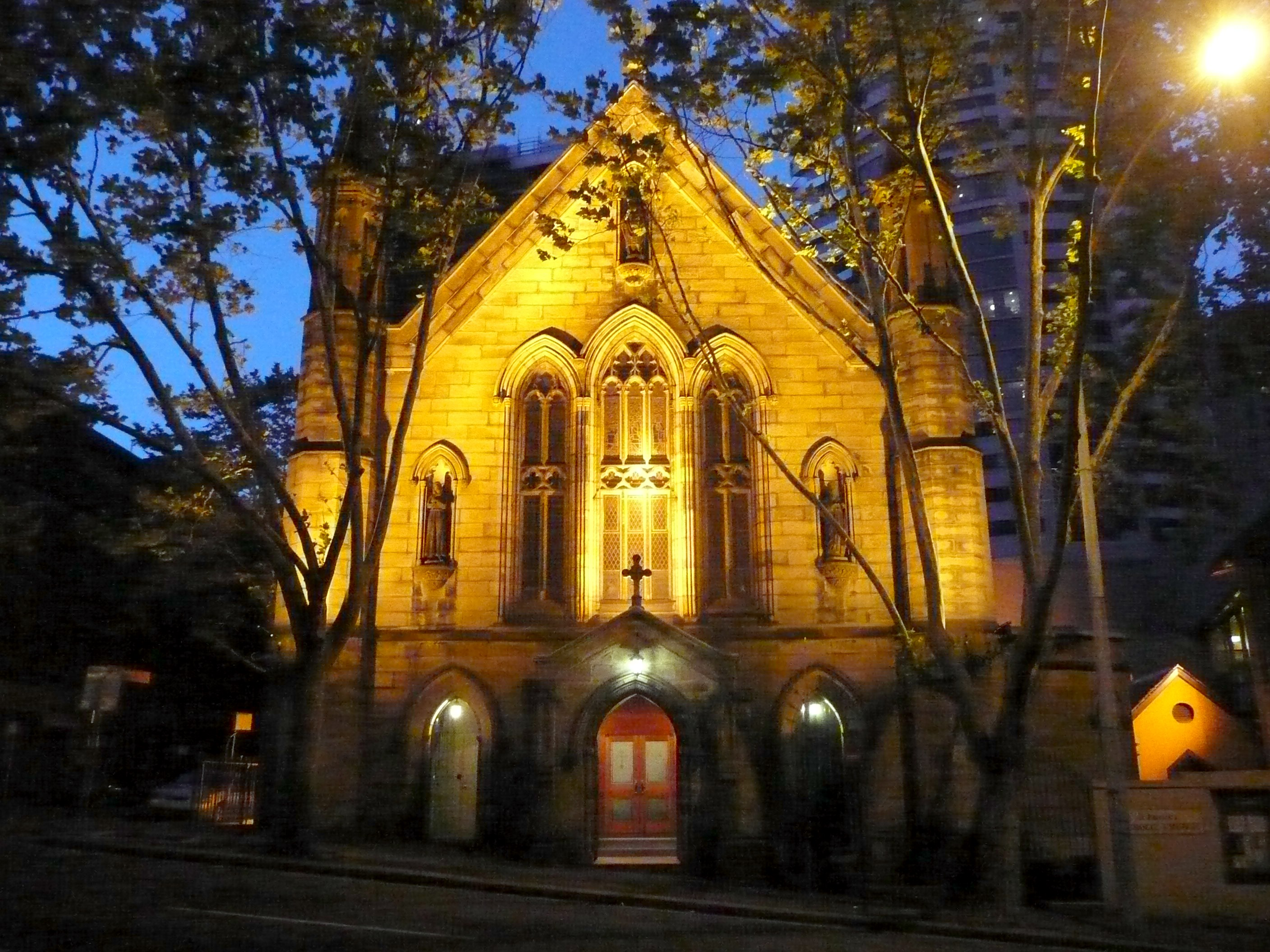
St Patrick's Church, The Rocks; completed 1840.

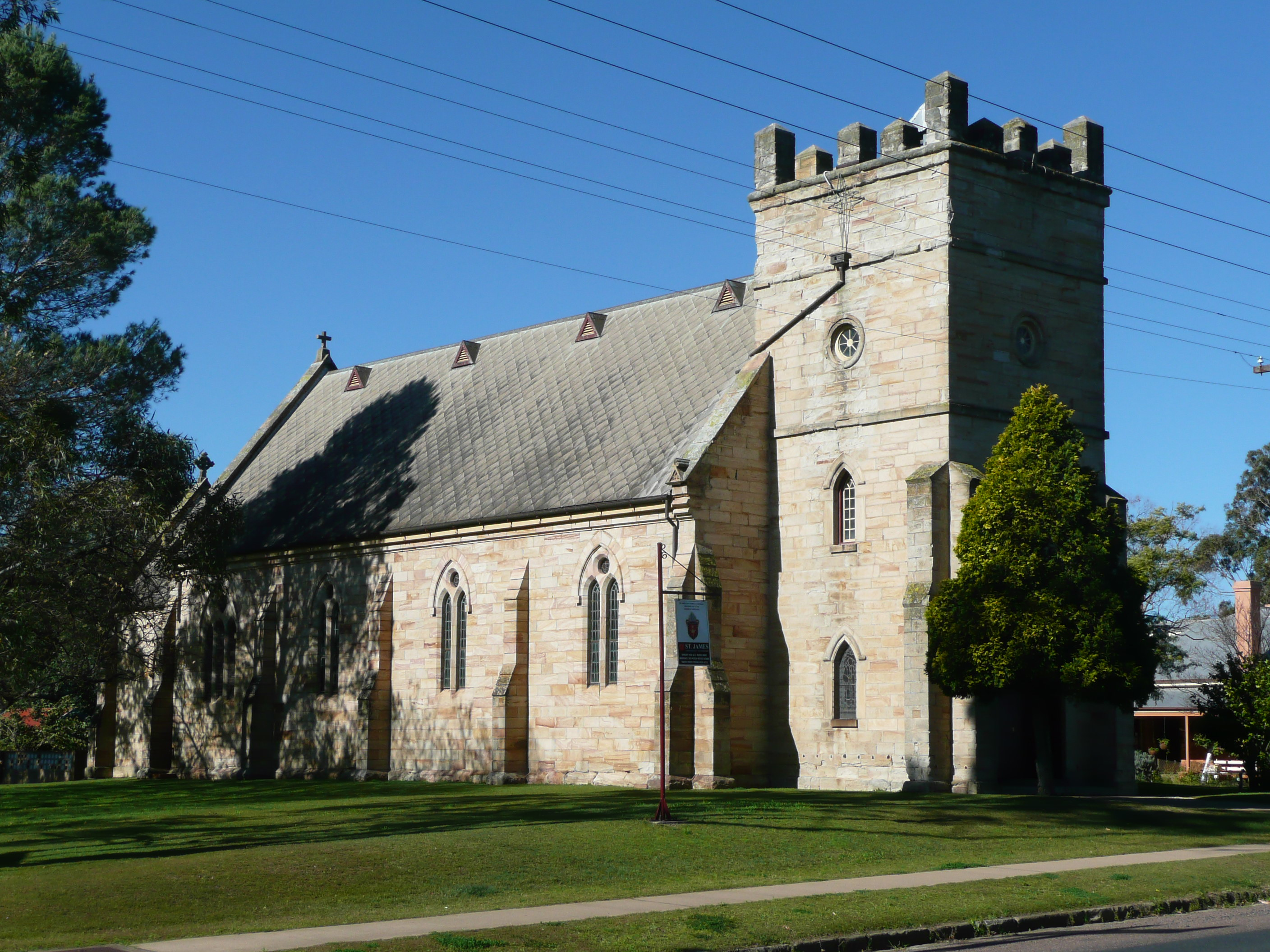
St James' Anglican Church, Morpeth; completed in 1840

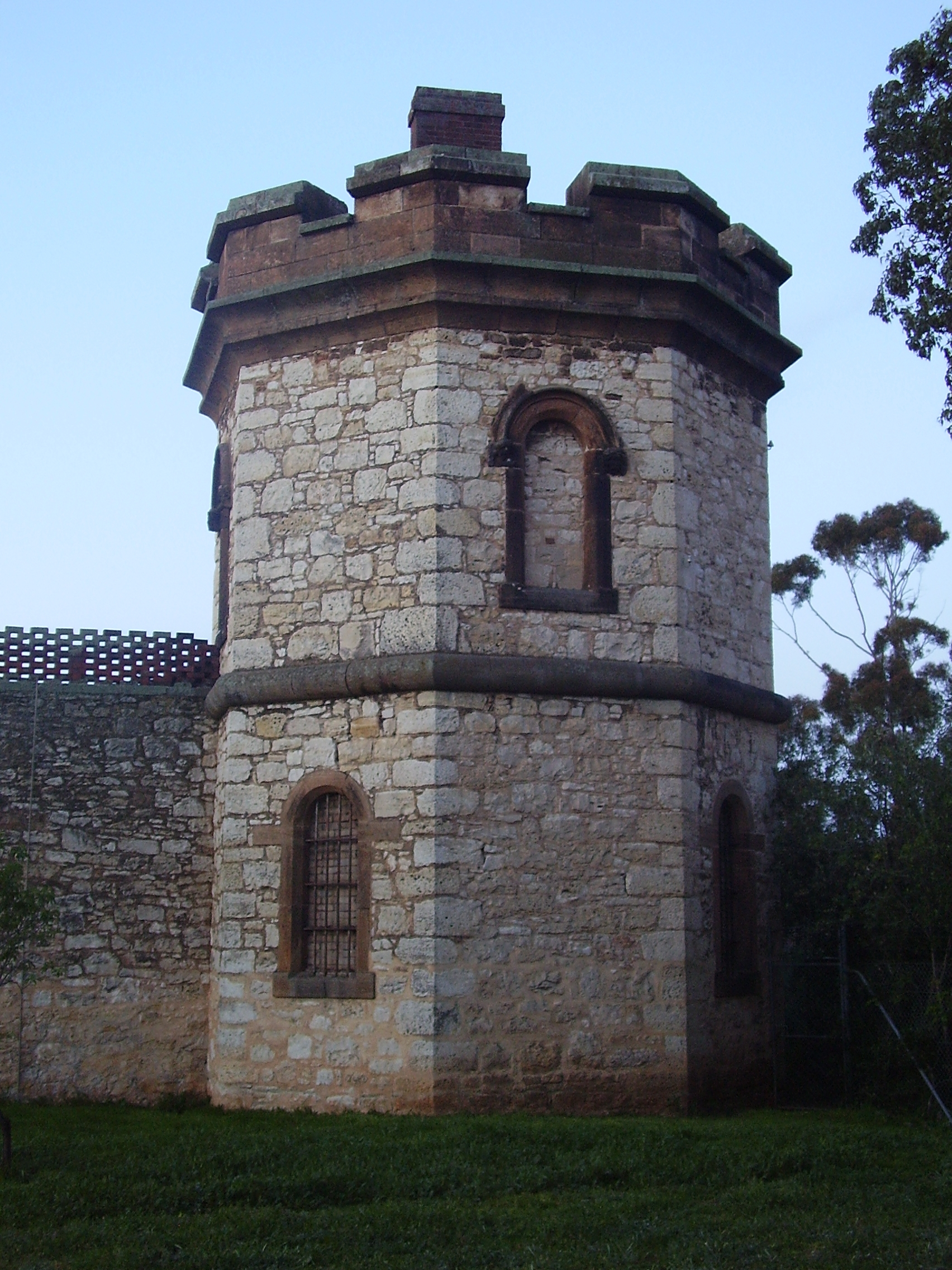
Adelaide Gaol, Northern Parklands, Adelaide. Completed 1841.

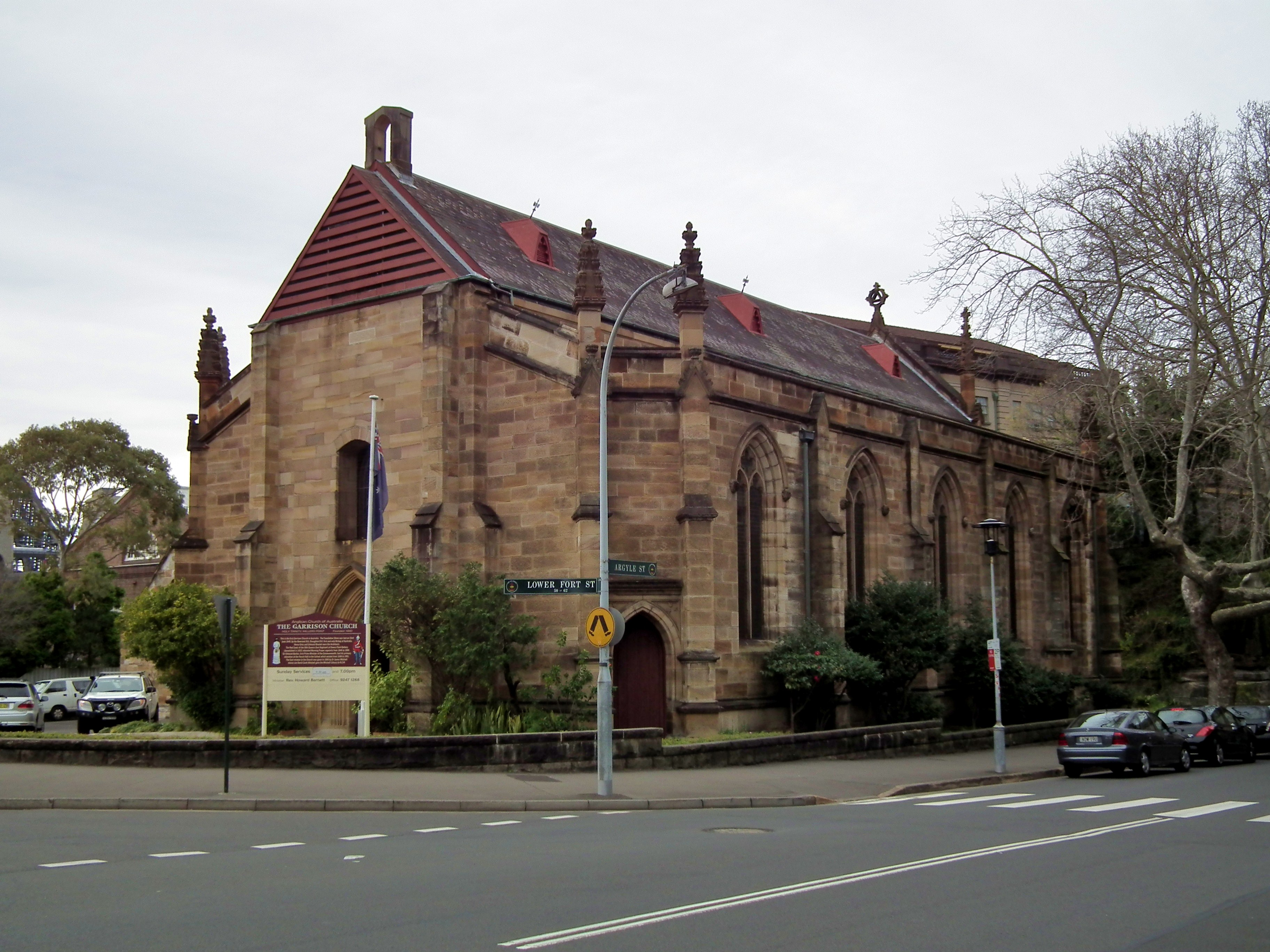
Garrison Church, Sydney; completed in 1846

St Peter's Church, Eastern Hill Melbourne; completed in 1846

== Victorian period (c. 1840–c. 1890) ==
The Victorian period, generally aligned with the reign of Queen Victoria, covers the period from c. 1840 to c. 1890 and comprises fifteen styles, all prefaced by the word "Victorian", and are namely, in loose chronological order, Georgian, Regency, Egyptian, Academic Classical, Free Classical, Filigree, Mannerist, Second Empire, Italianate, Romanesque, Byzantine, Academic Gothic, Free Gothic, Tudor, Rustic Gothic, and Carpenter Gothic.

=== Victorian Georgian ===
An extension and continuation of the Old Colonial Georgian style into the Victorian era. Georgian style houses built before c.1840 are characterised as Old Colonial Georgian, while buildings between c.1840 and c.1890 are characterised as Victorian Georgian. Both styles are essentially the same, being characterised by symmetrical facades, simple rectangular and prismatic shapes, and orderliness. Six and eight paned windows were common.

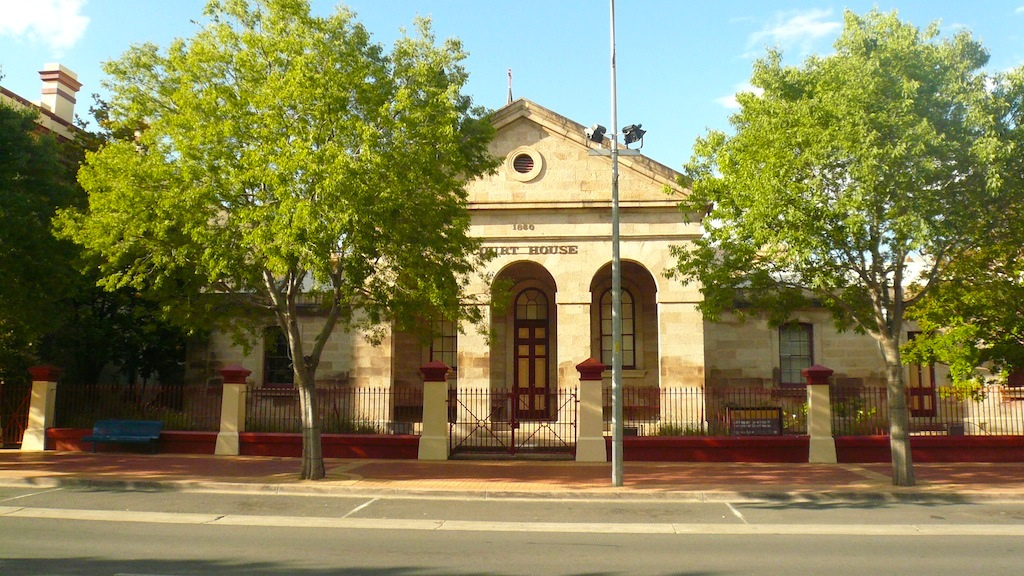
Albury Court House, Albury; built 1860; Palladian-style

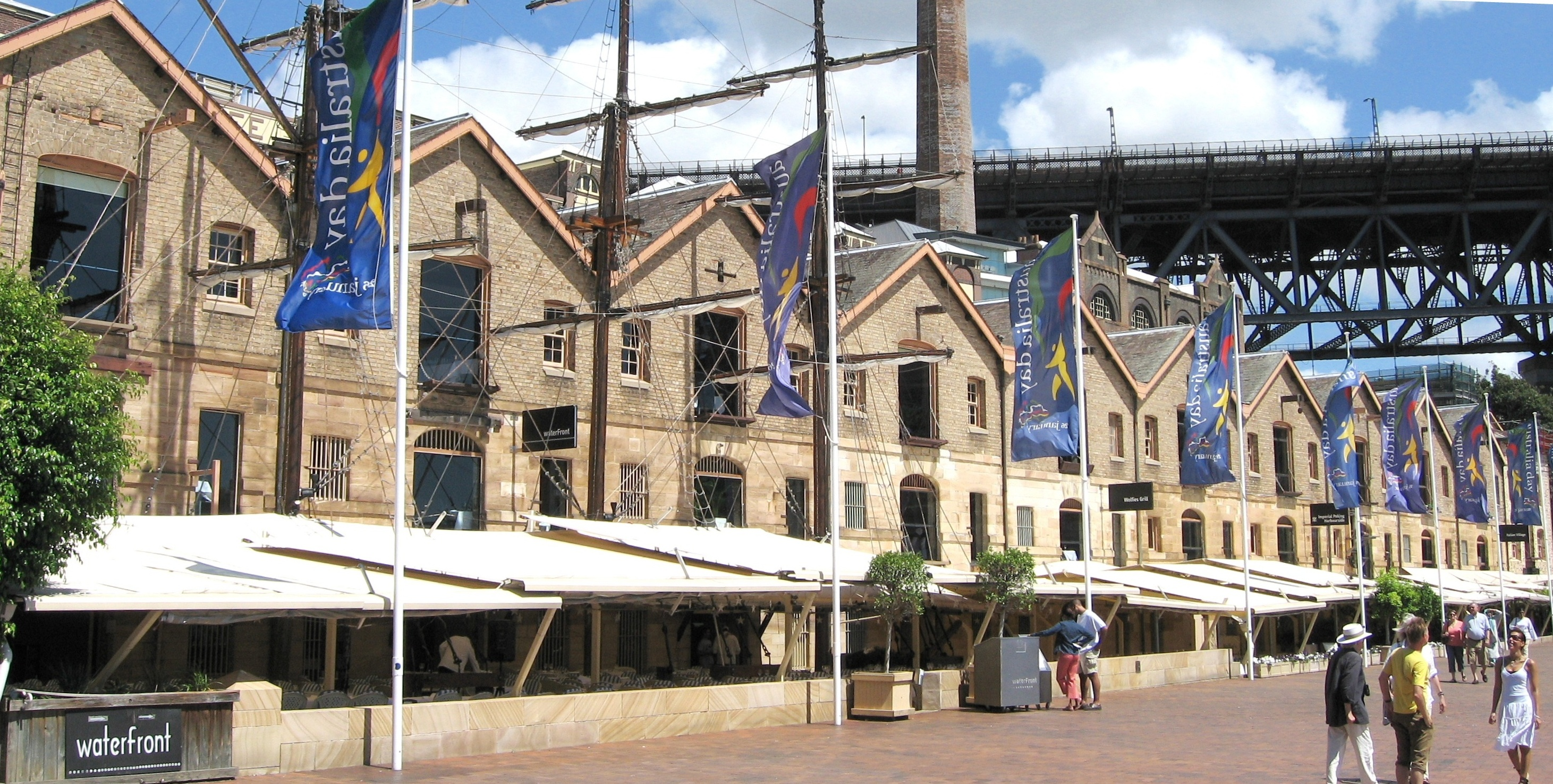
Campbell's Stores, The Rocks; built 1850–1861

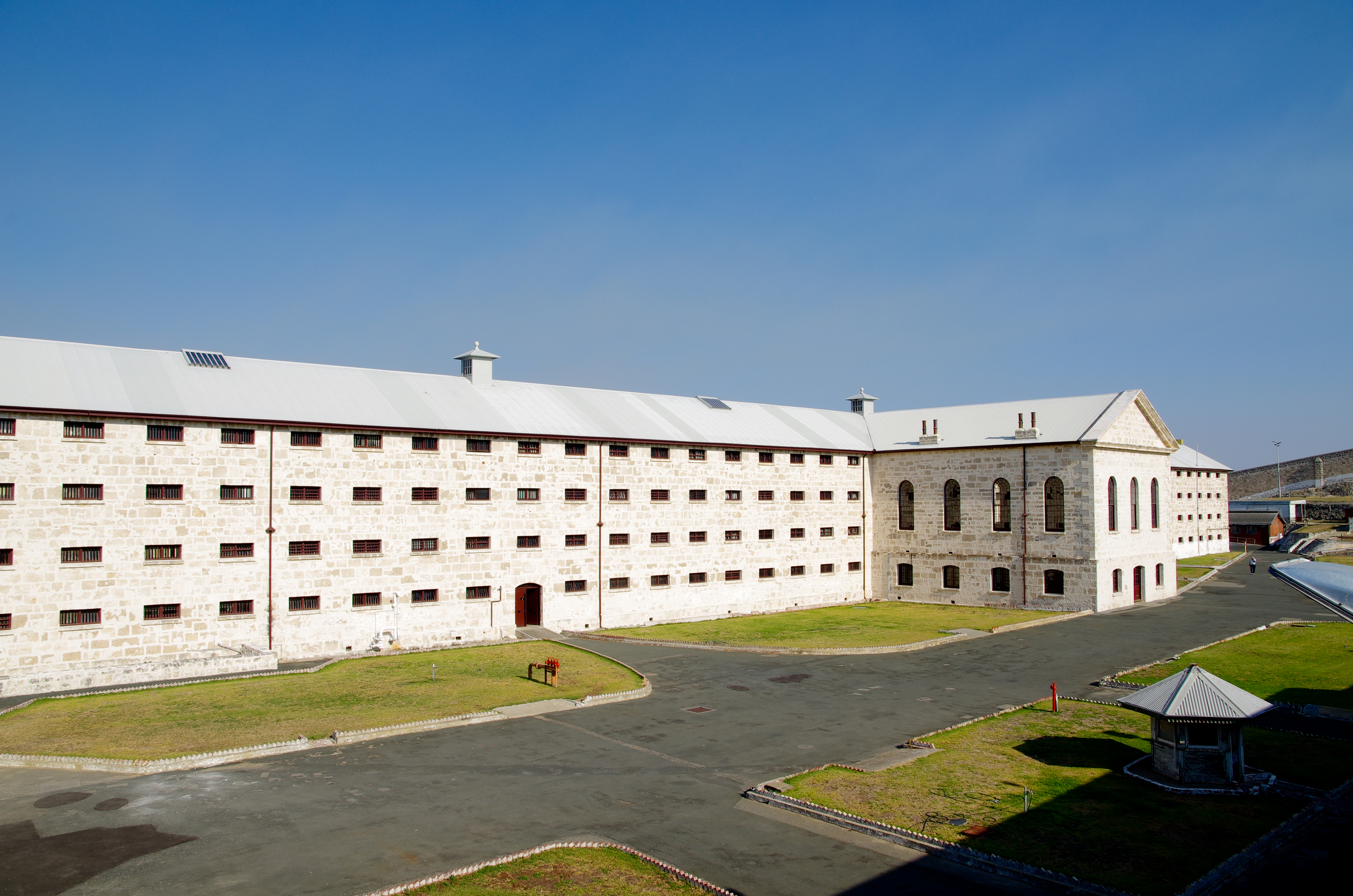
Fremantle Prison, Fremantle; built 1850–57.

=== Victorian Regency ===
As with Victorian Georgian architecture, the Victorian Regency style was a continuation of the Old Colonial Regency style into the Victorian era (c.1840 – c.1890). A more elegant and refined form of the Georgian style.

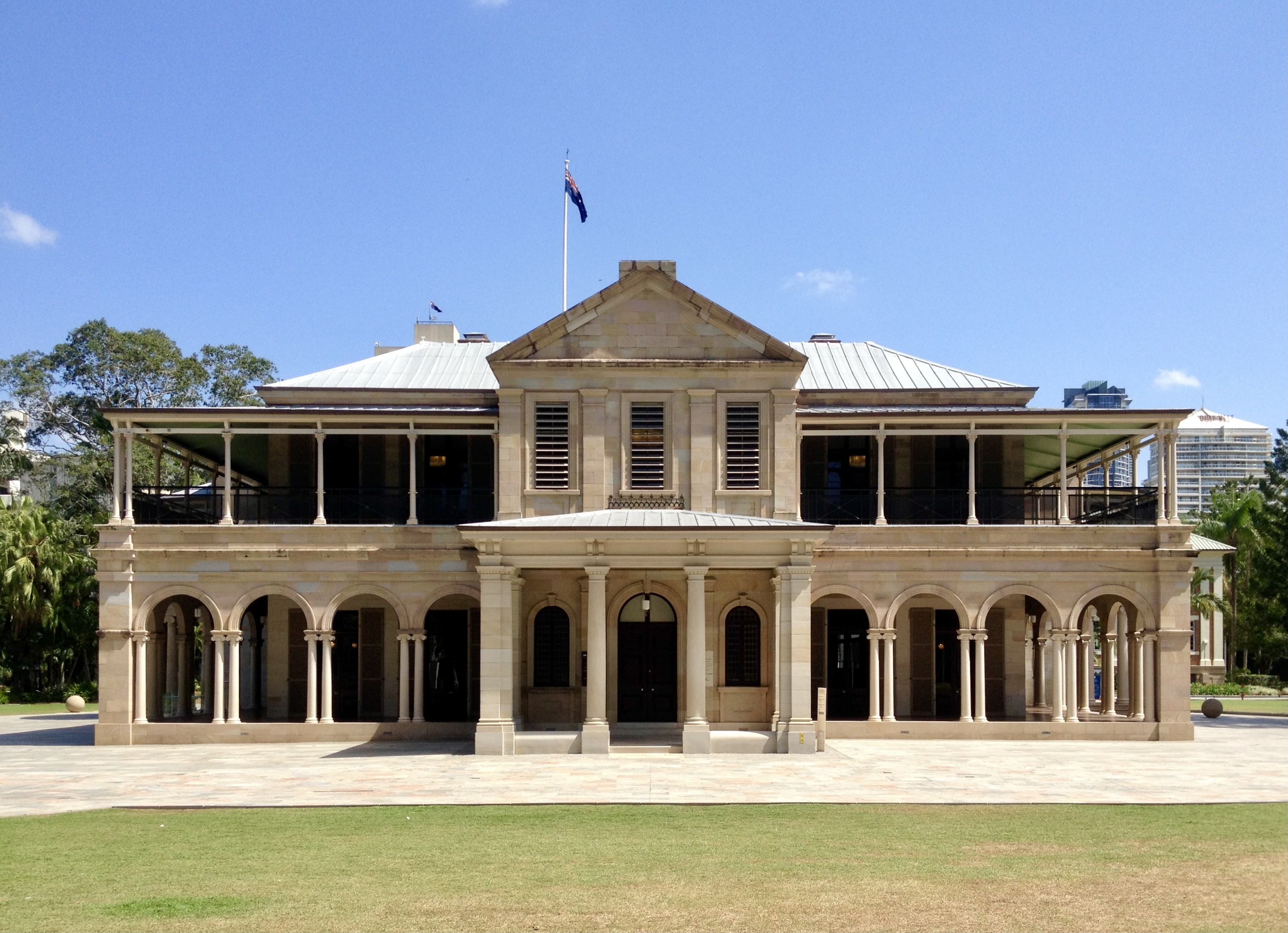
Old Government House, Brisbane; completed 1862

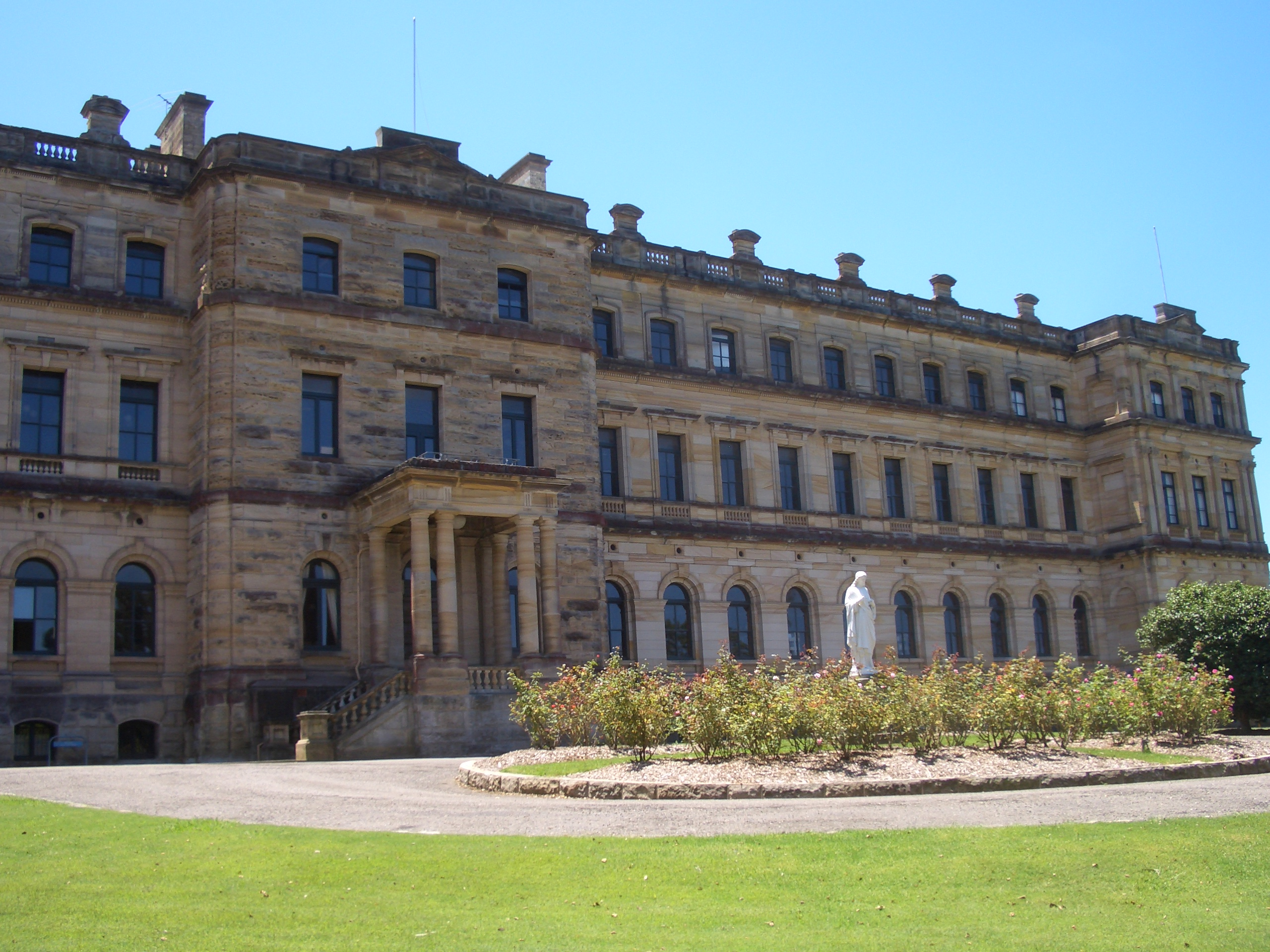
Saint Ignatius' College, Riverview, Sydney

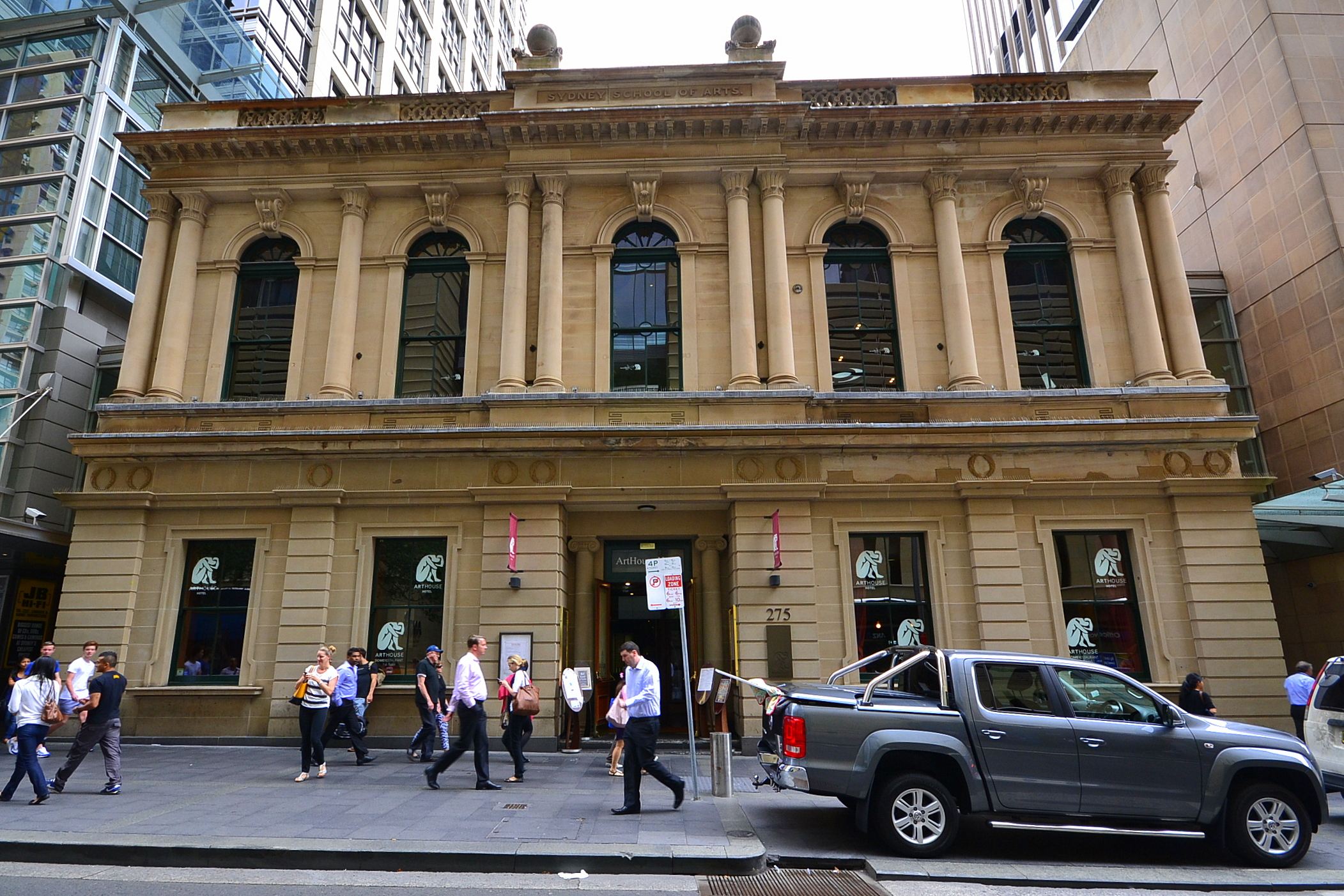
Sydney School of Arts building, 1861

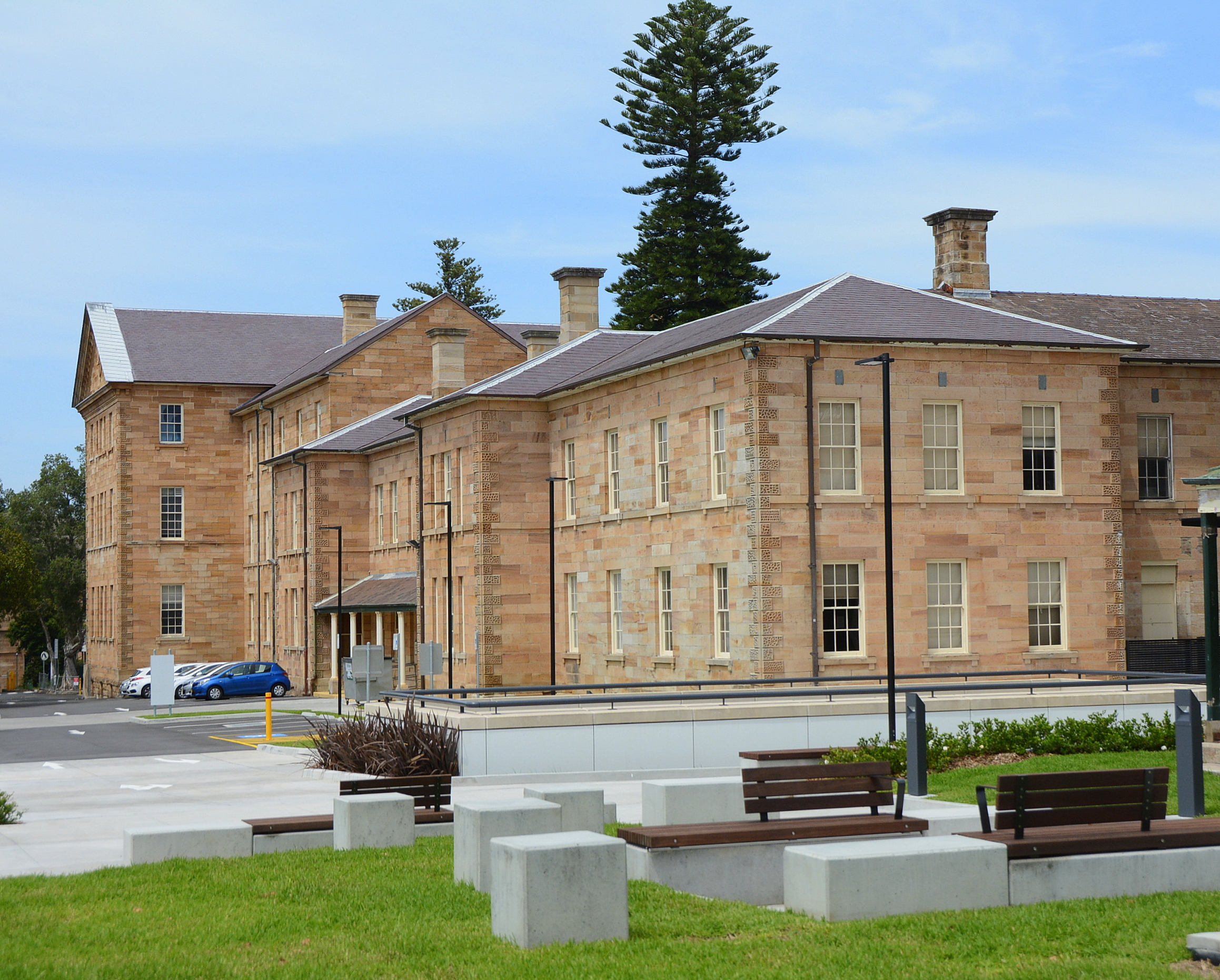
Edmund Blacket Building, Prince of Wales Hospital, Sydney

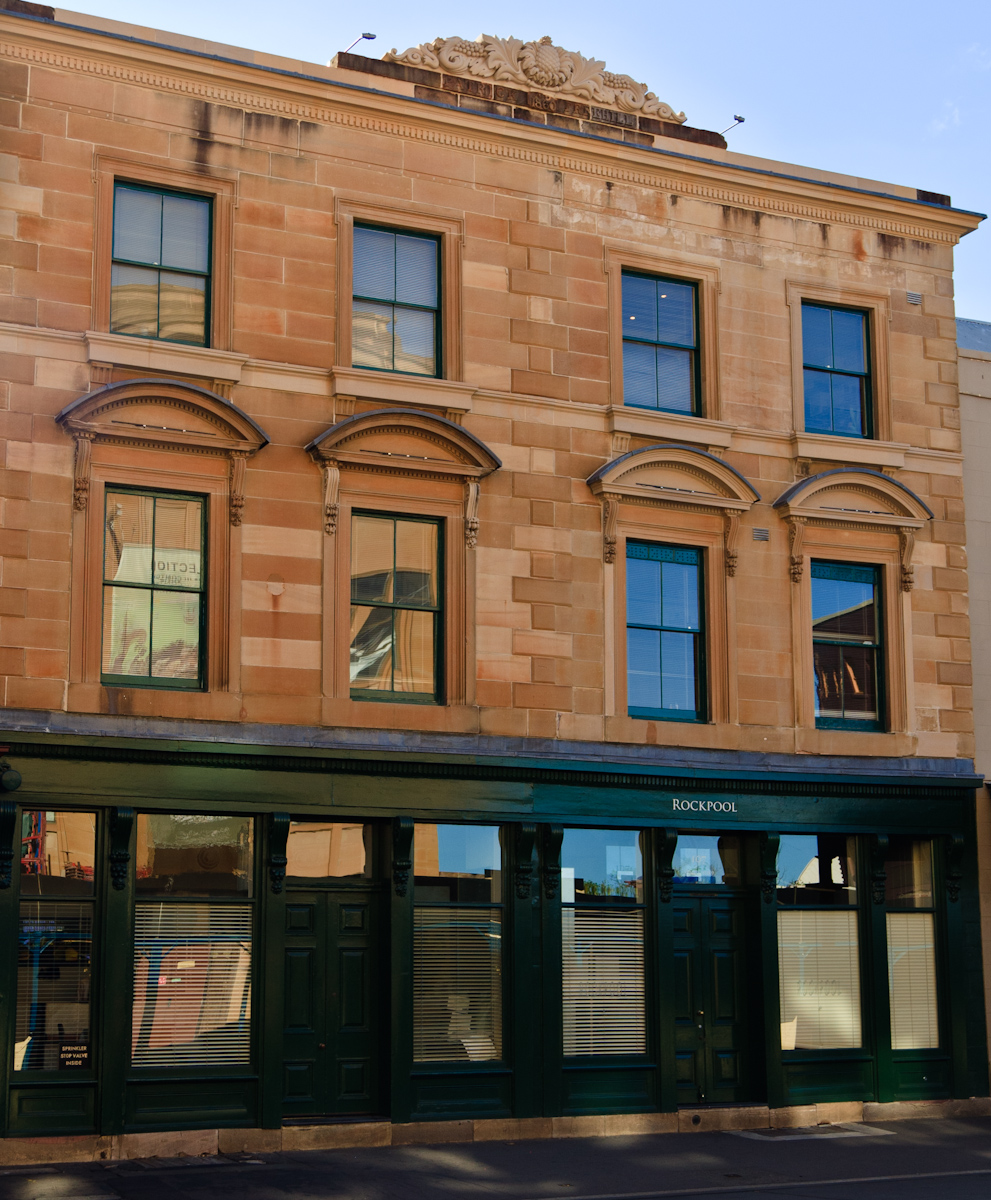
Rockpool, The Rocks

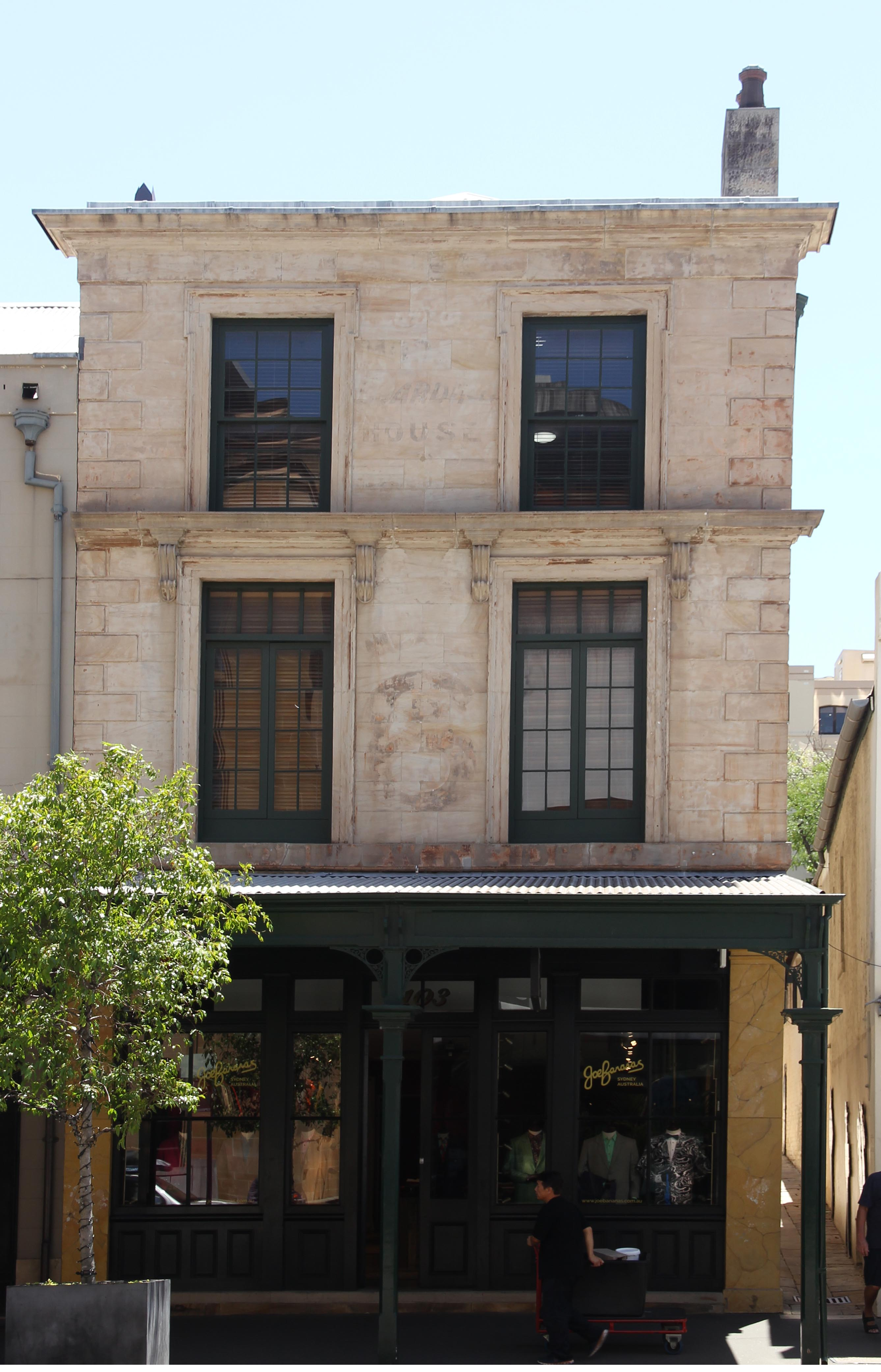
103 George Street, The Rocks

=== Victorian Egyptian ===
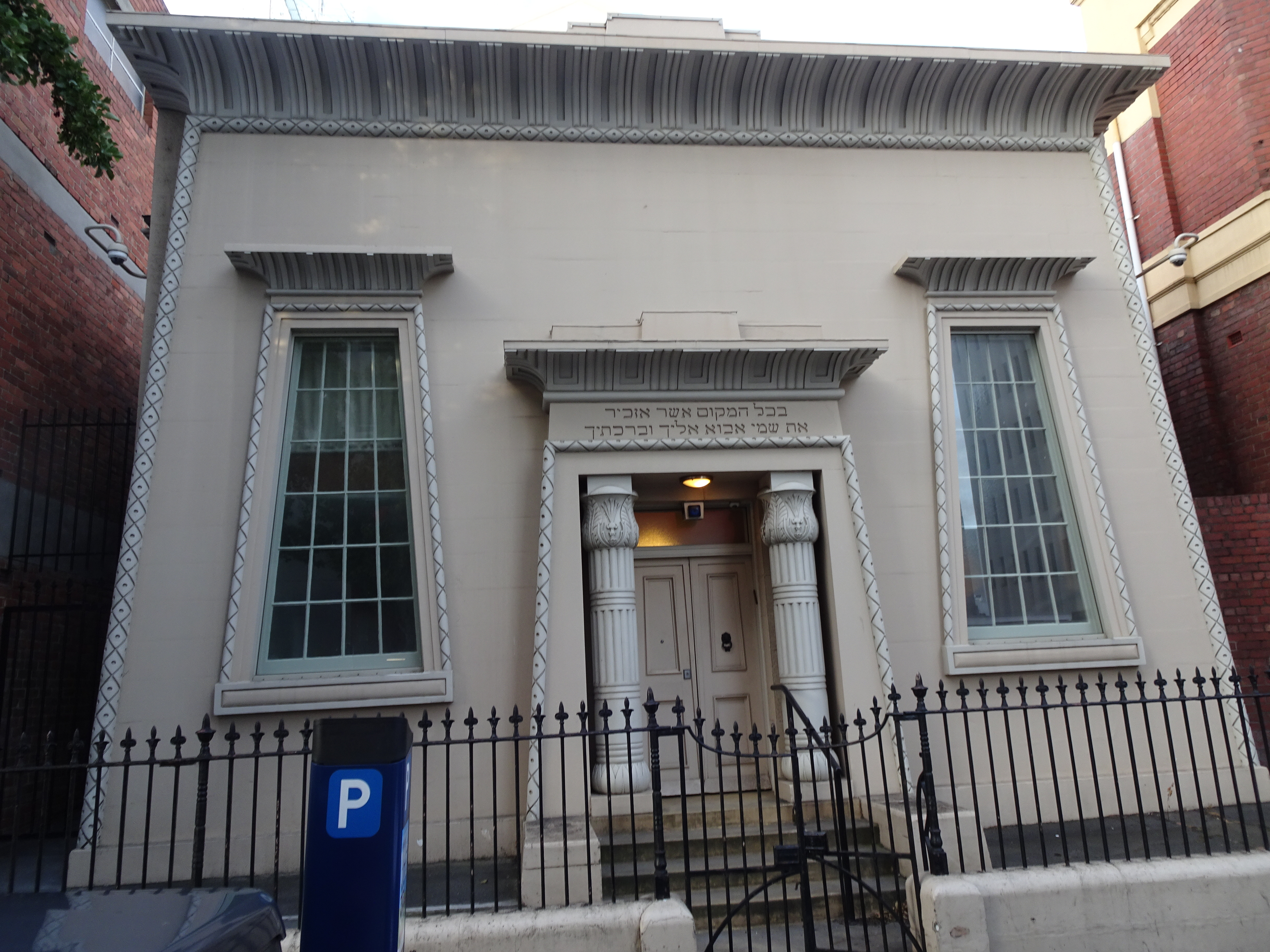
Hobart Synagogue, Tasmania (1845).

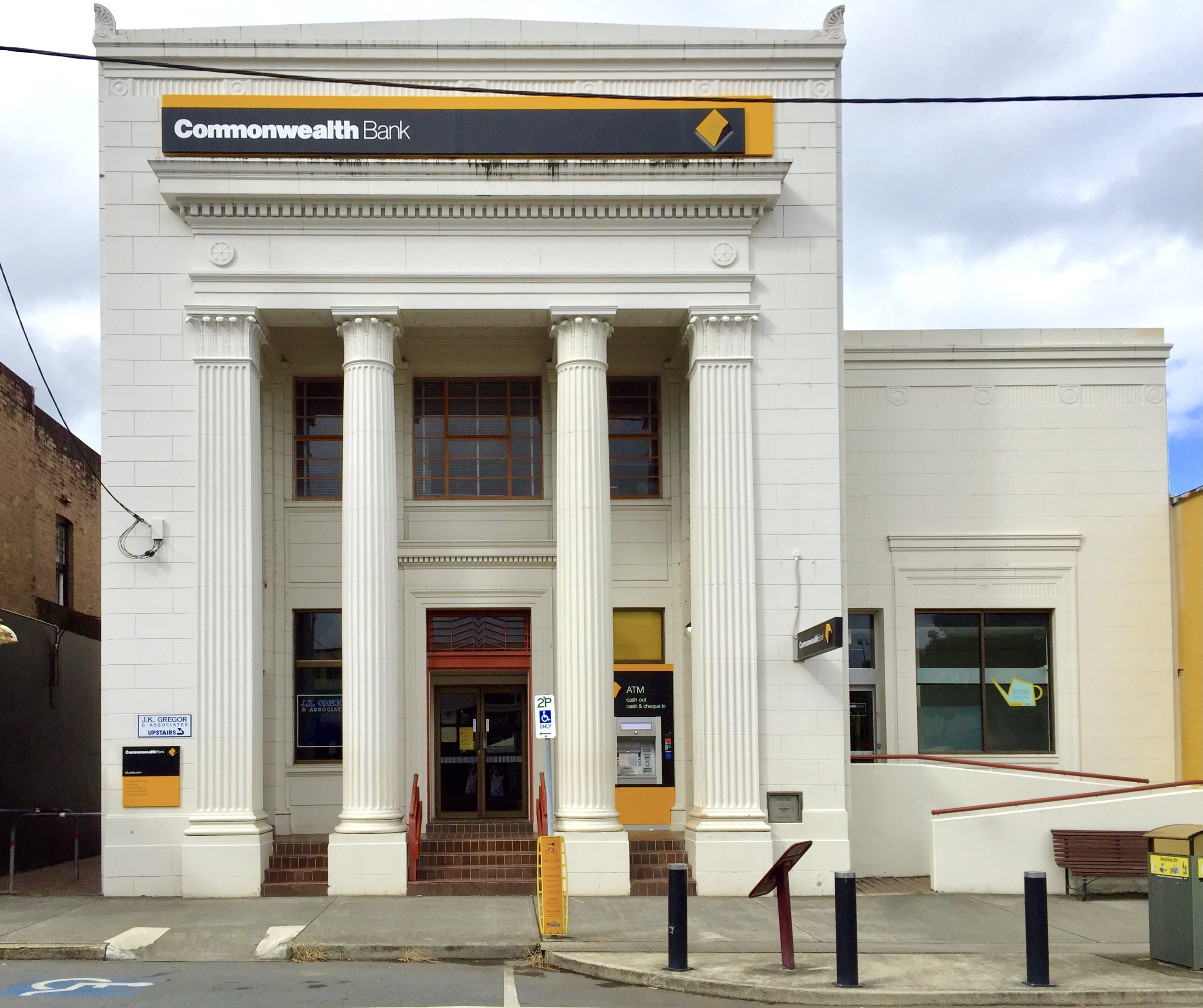
Commonwealth Bank building, Murwillumbah

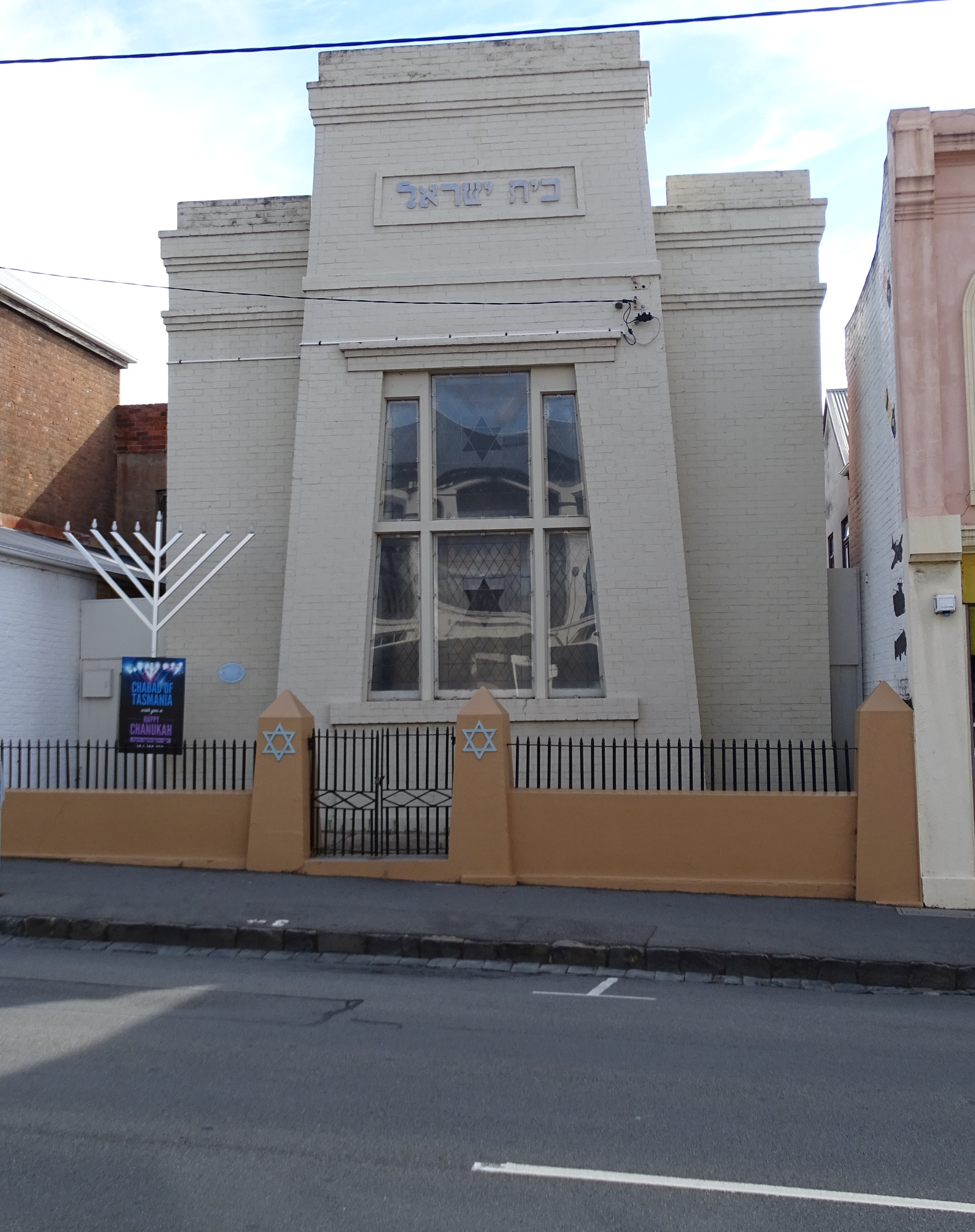
Launceston Synagogue (1846).

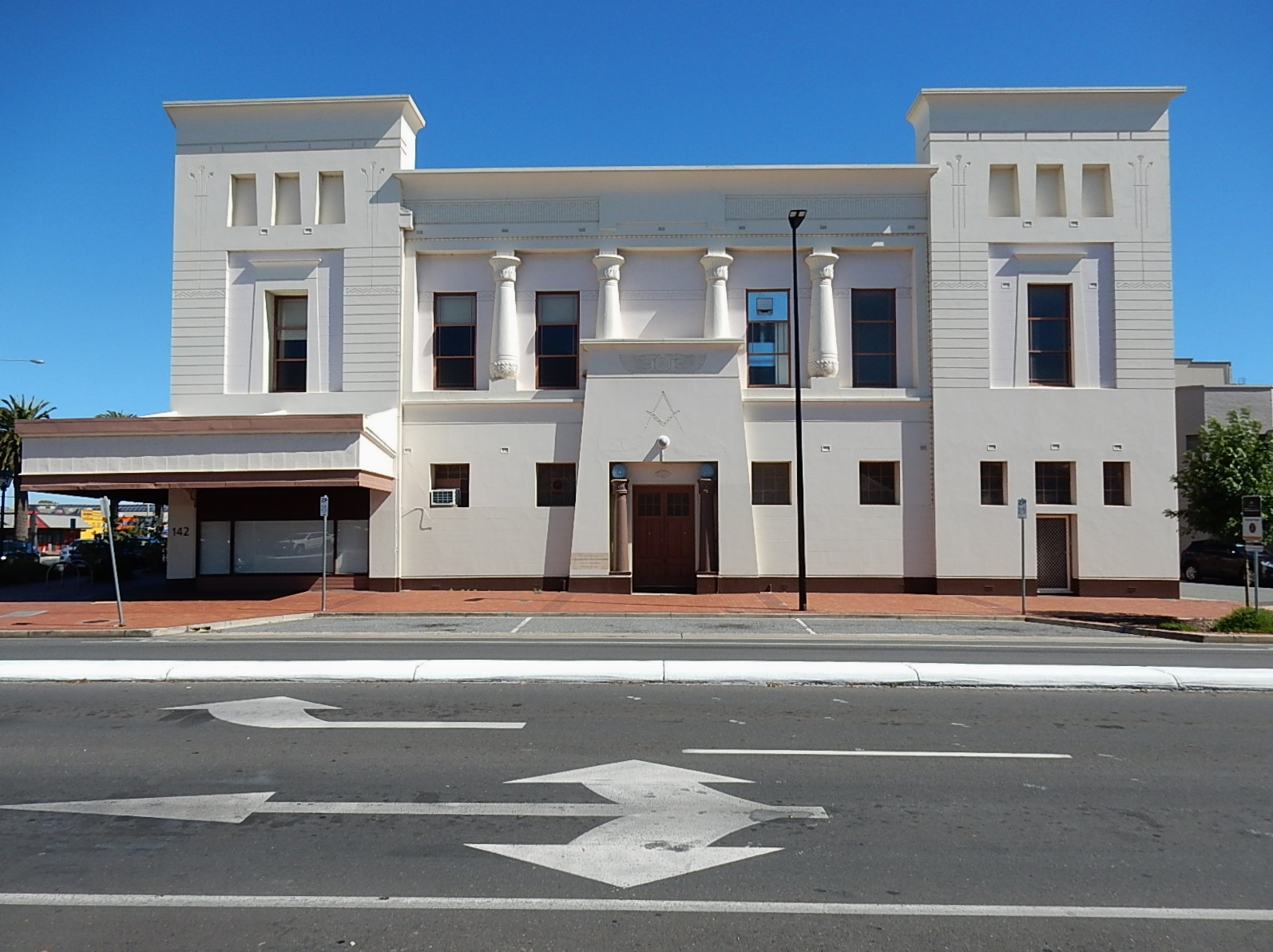
Masonic Centre, Adelaide. (1858)

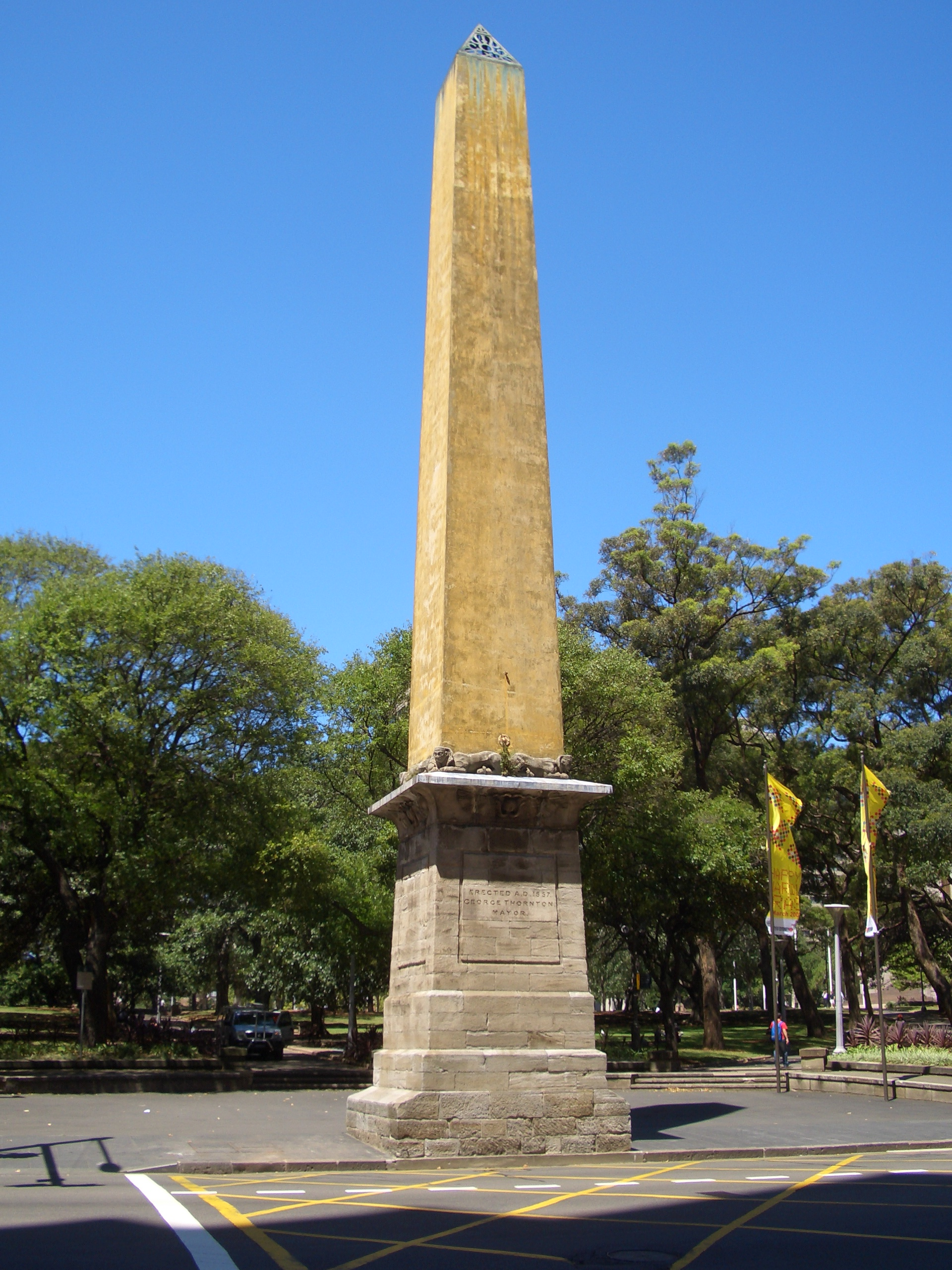
Obelisk at junction of Elizabeth and Bathurst Streets, Sydney.

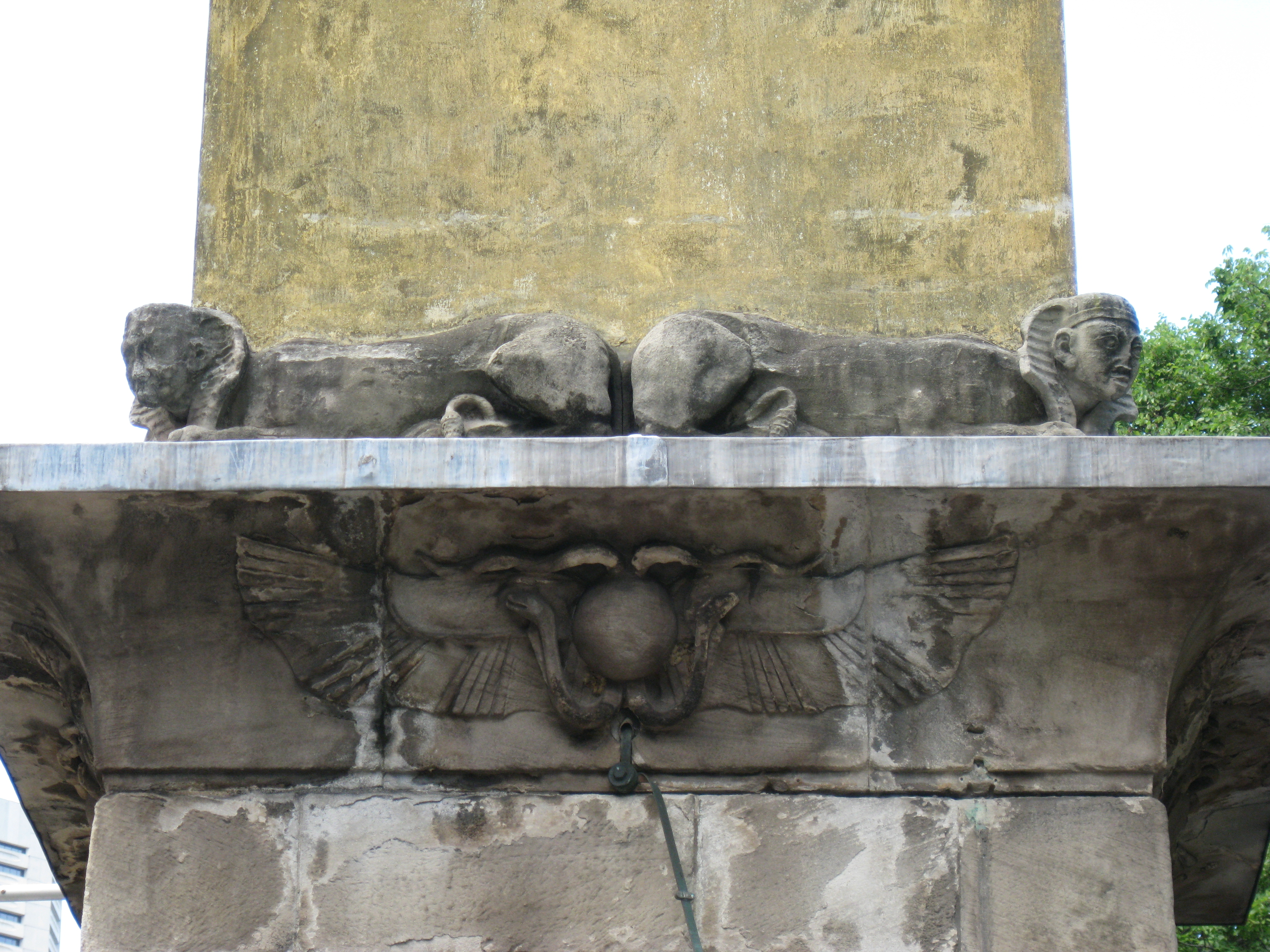
Obelisk, Sydney, detail

=== Victorian Academic Classical ===
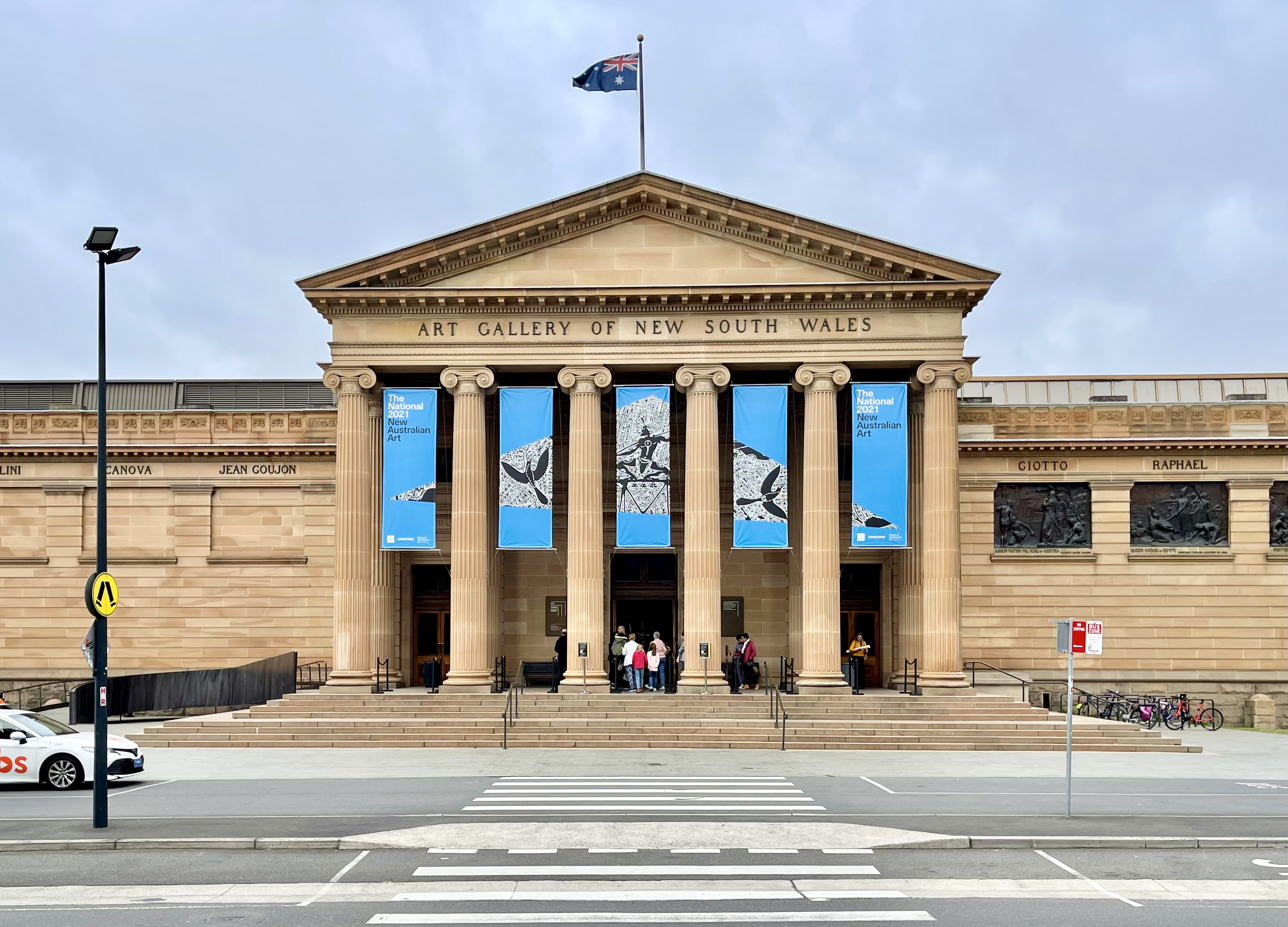
Art Gallery of New South Wales; completed in 1897

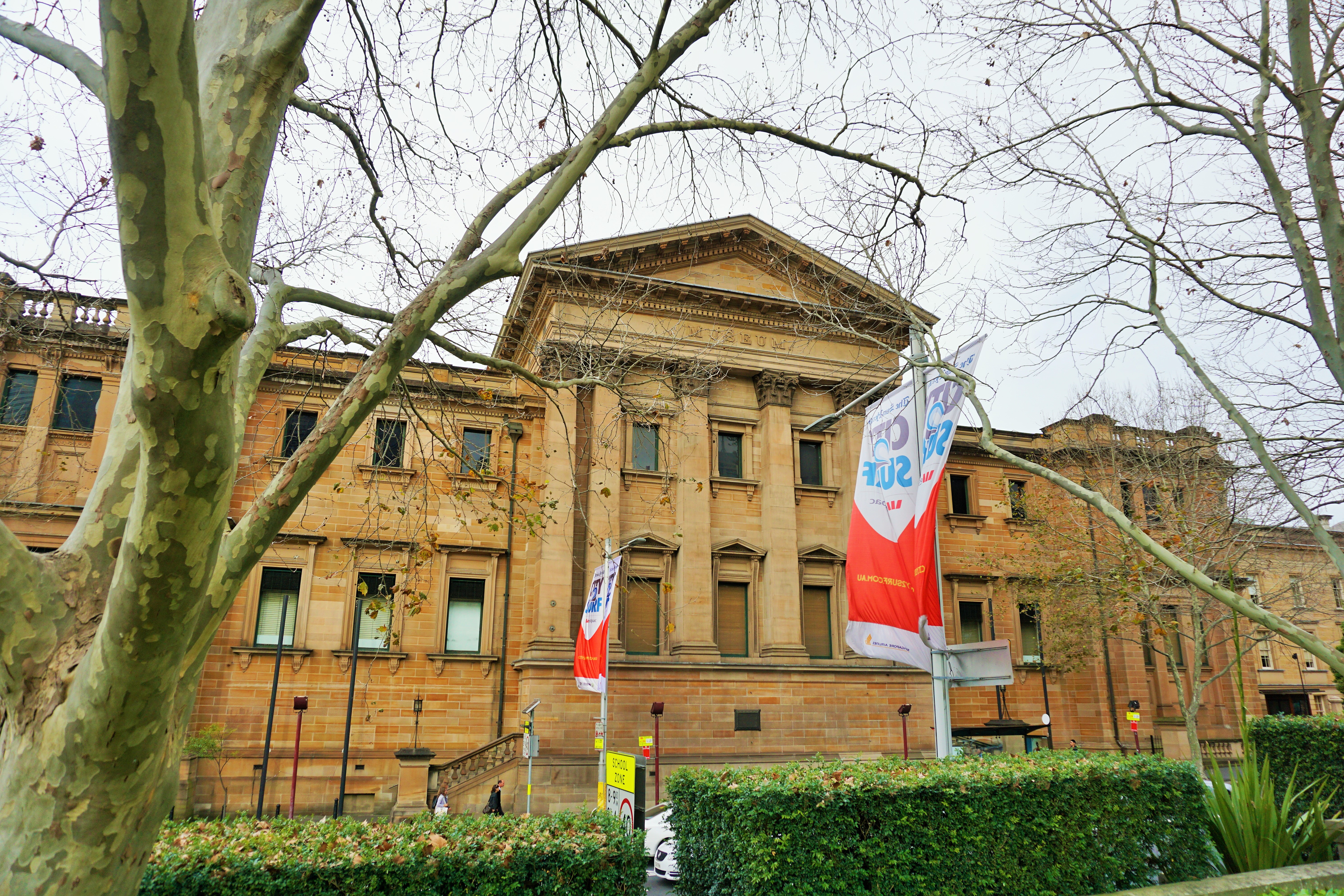
Australian Museum, Sydney; completed in 1857

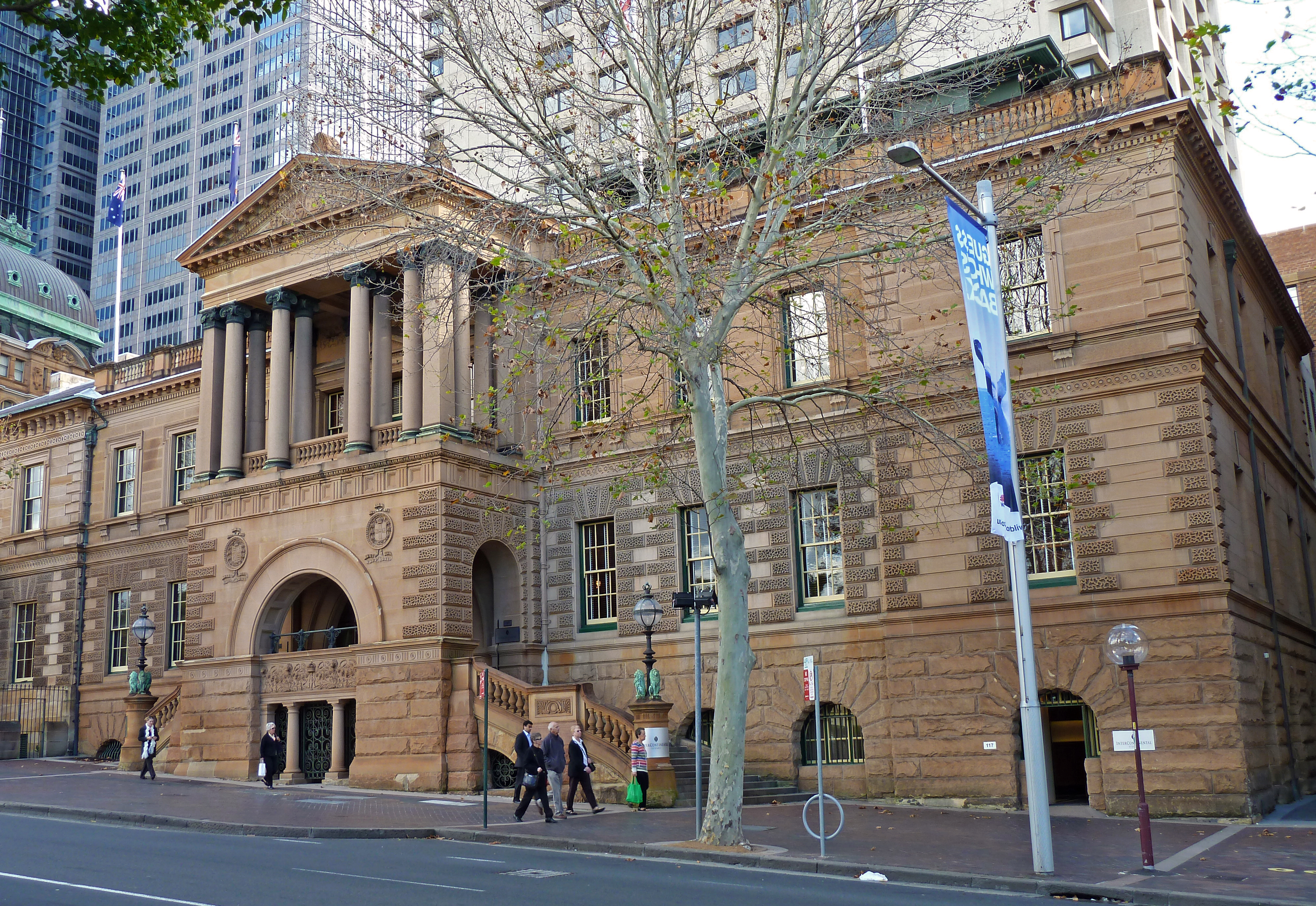
Treasury Building, Sydney. Completed 1851

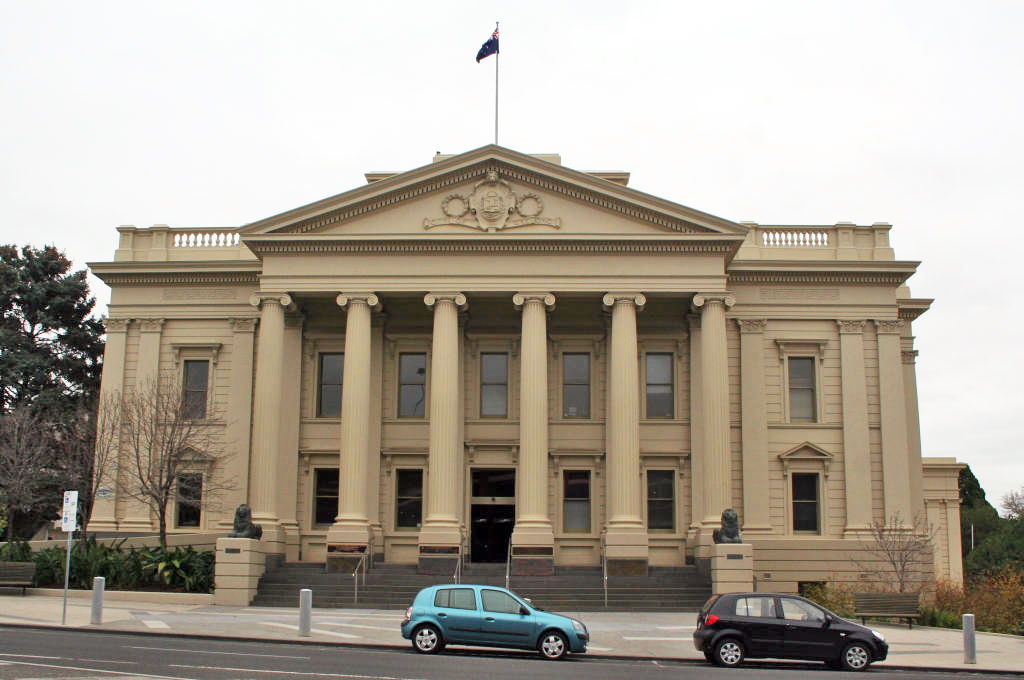
Geelong Town Hall. Designed 1855; completed 1917.

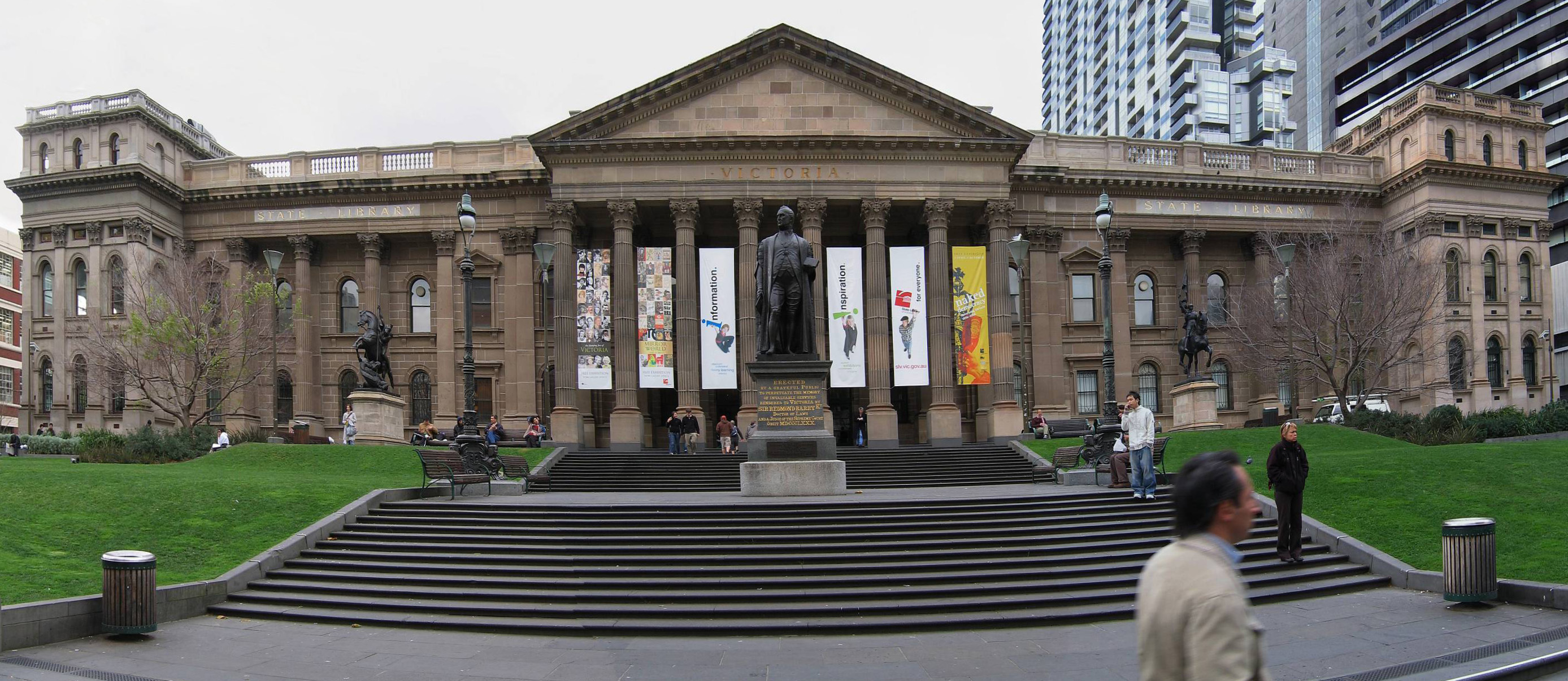
State Library of Victoria, Swanston Street, Melbourne; completed 1856

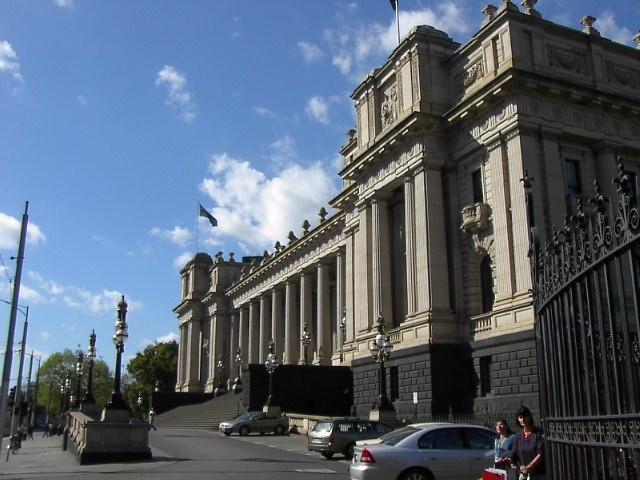
Parliament House, Melbourne; completed 1856.

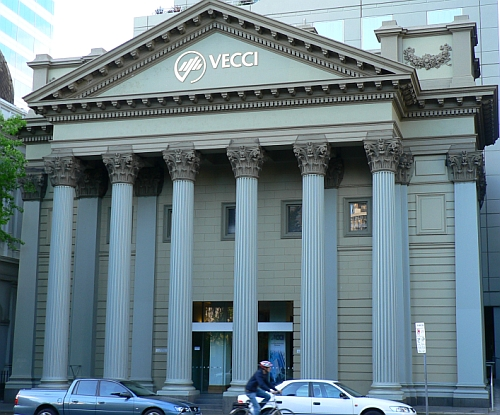
Former Baptist Church House, East Melbourne; completed 1863

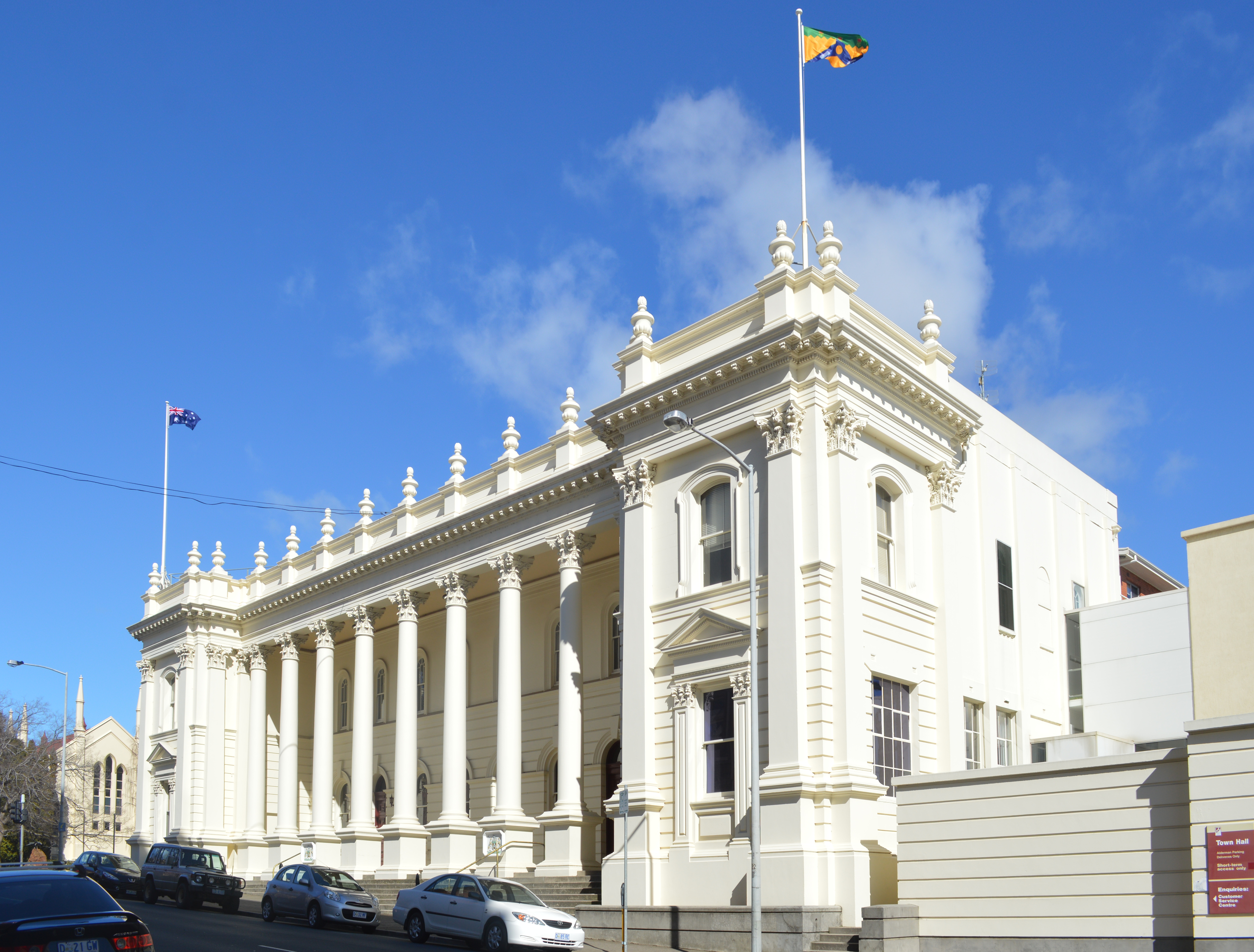
Launceston Town Hall, Launceston, Tasmania; c. 1864.

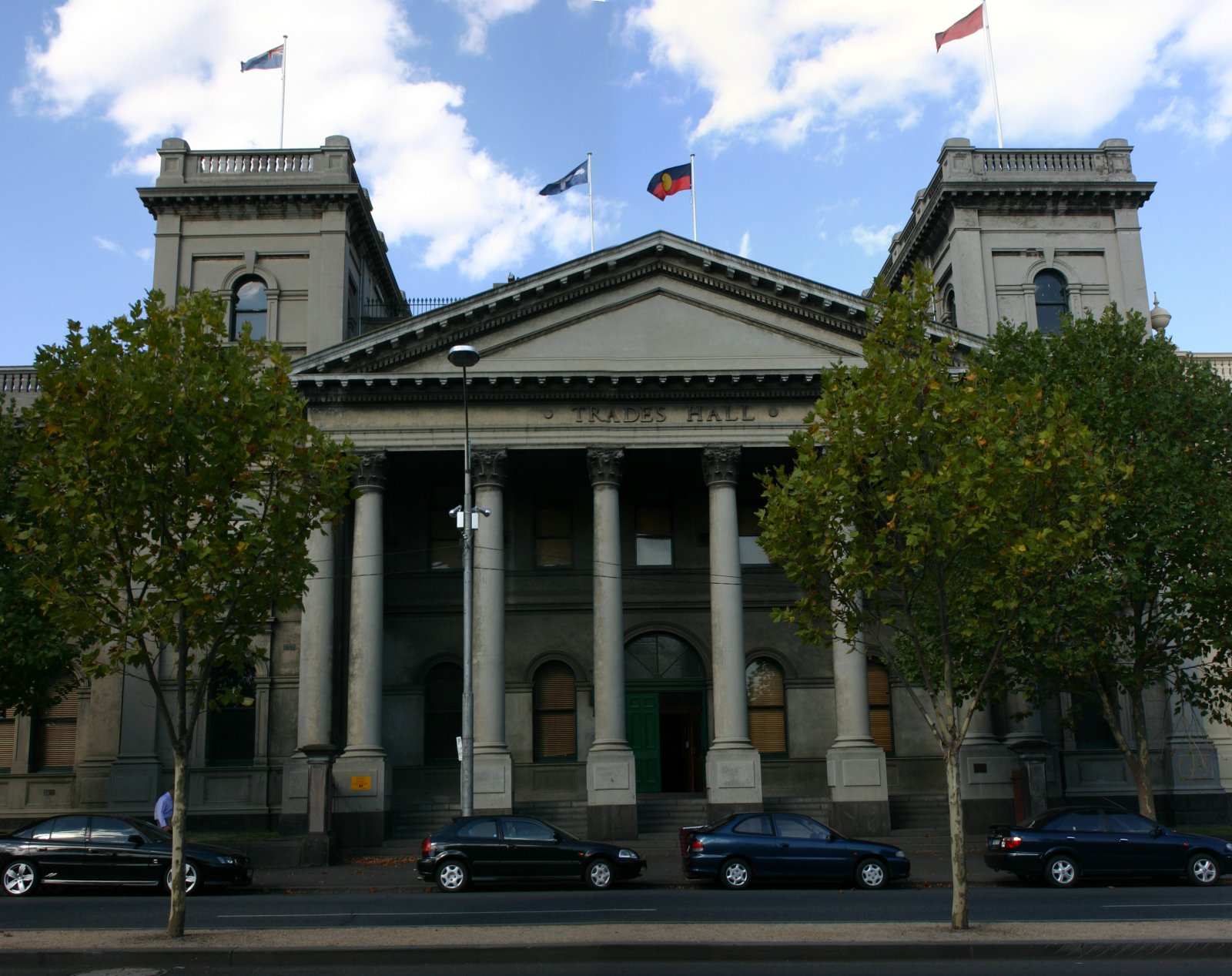
Melbourne Trades Hall; completed 1875

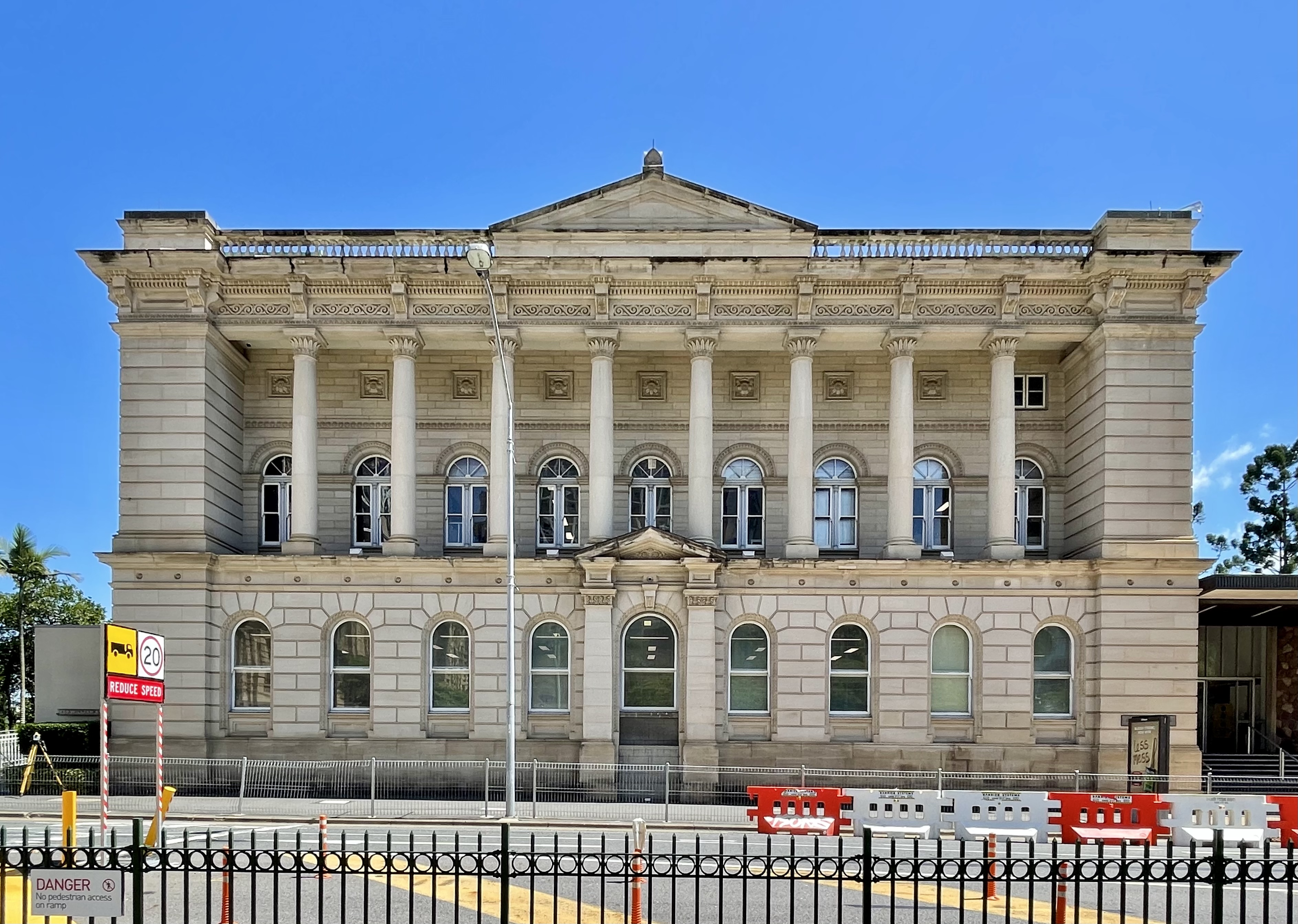
Old State Library Building, Brisbane; completed 1879

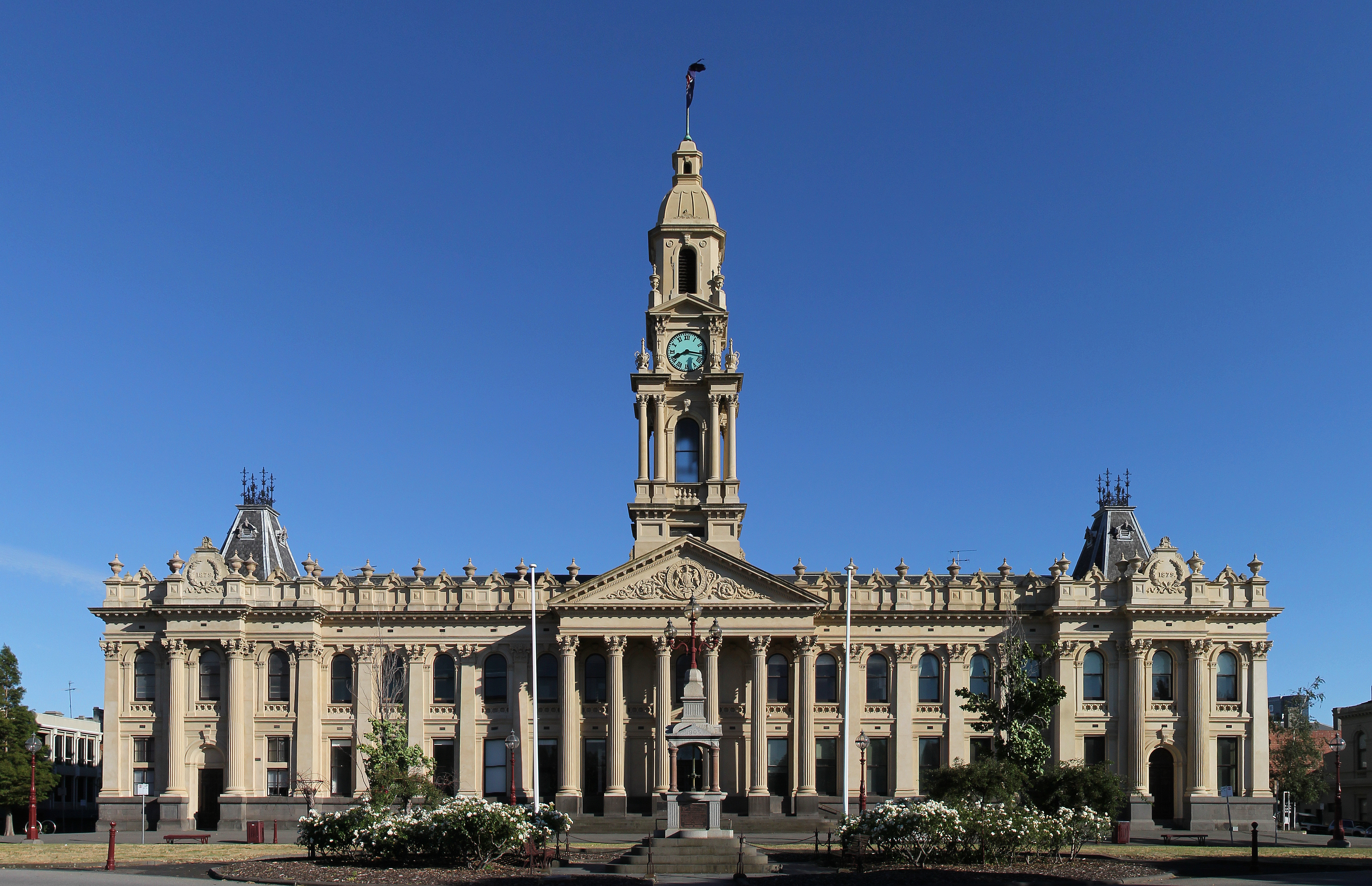
South Melbourne Town Hall, South Melbourne. Completed 1880.

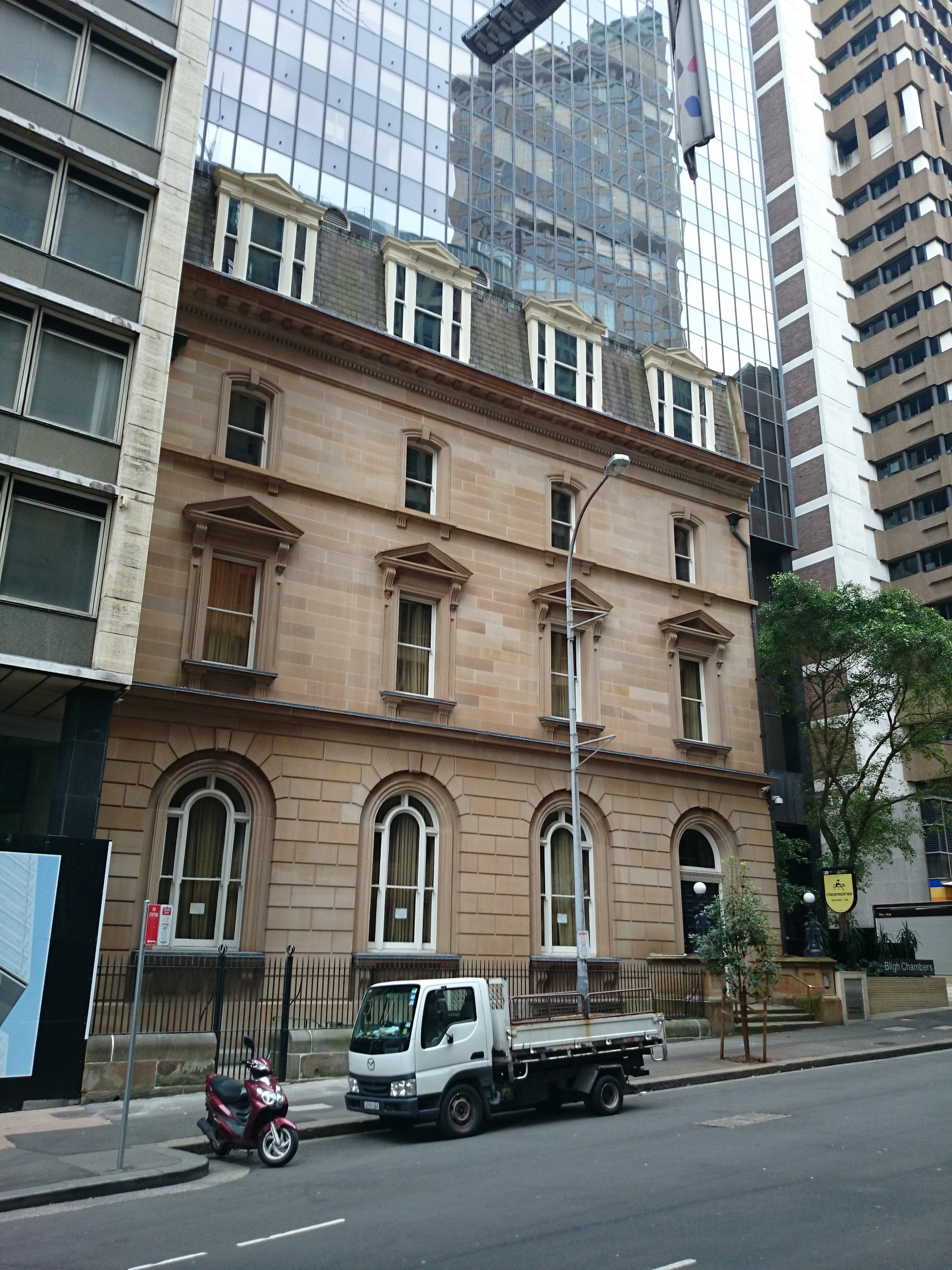
NSW Club House building; Sydney. Completed 1884.

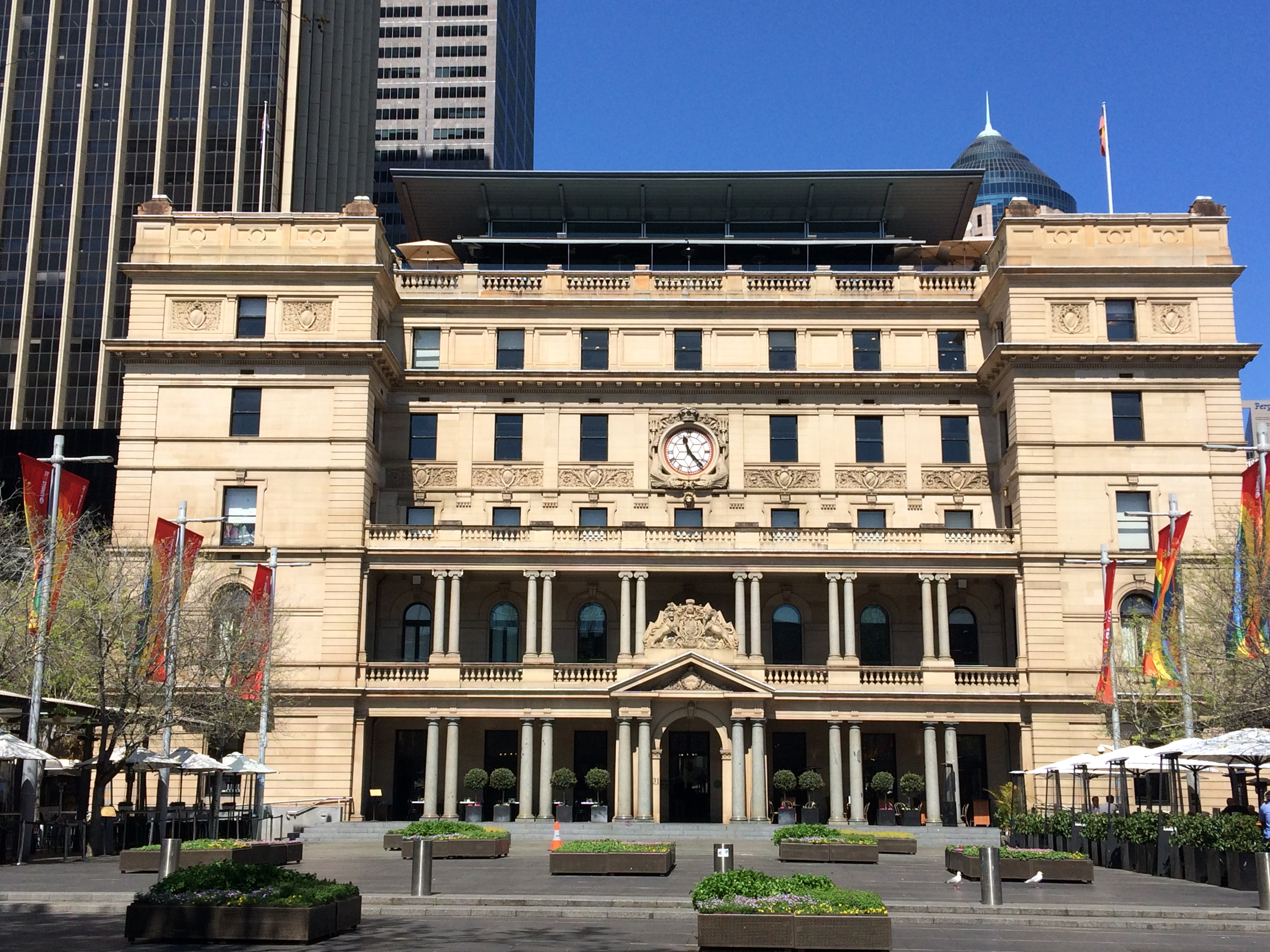
Customs House, Sydney; completed in 1887

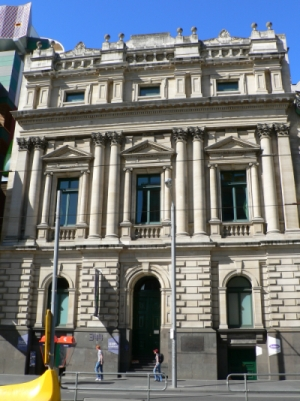
Former Hibernian Hall, Melbourne; completed 1887.

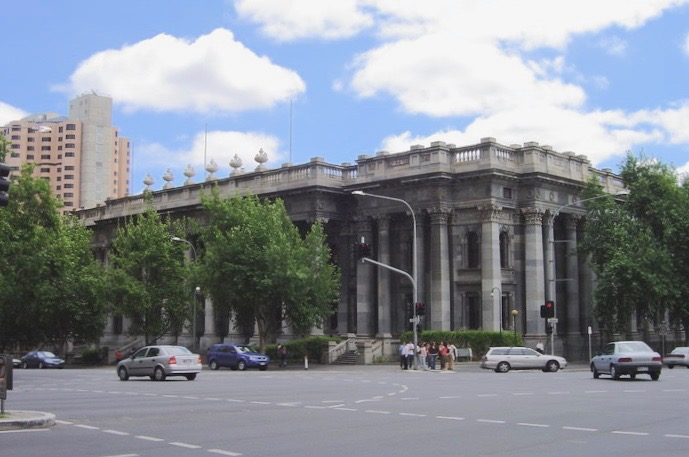
Parliament House, Adelaide; completed in 1889

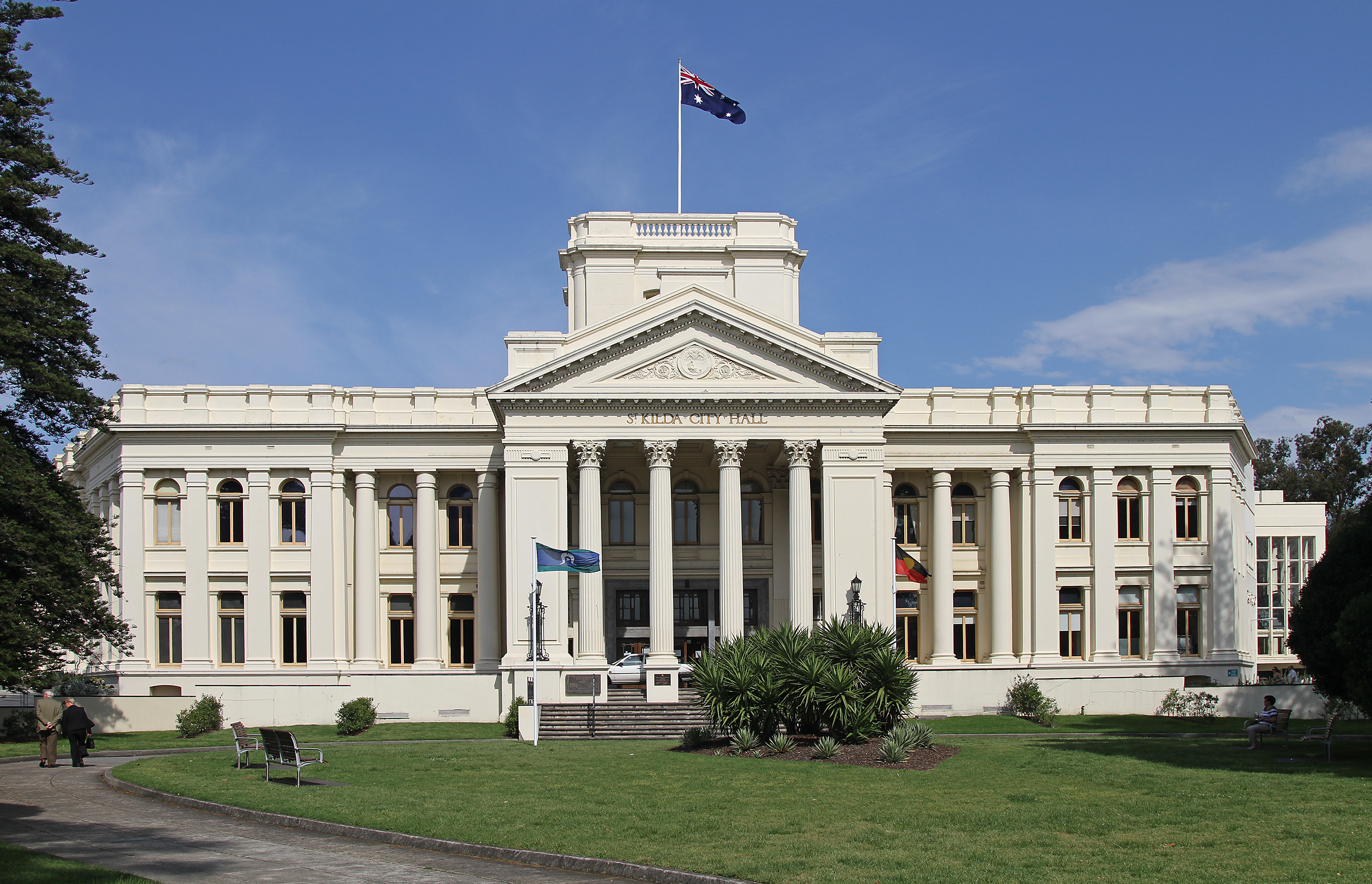
St Kilda Town Hall; completed 1890

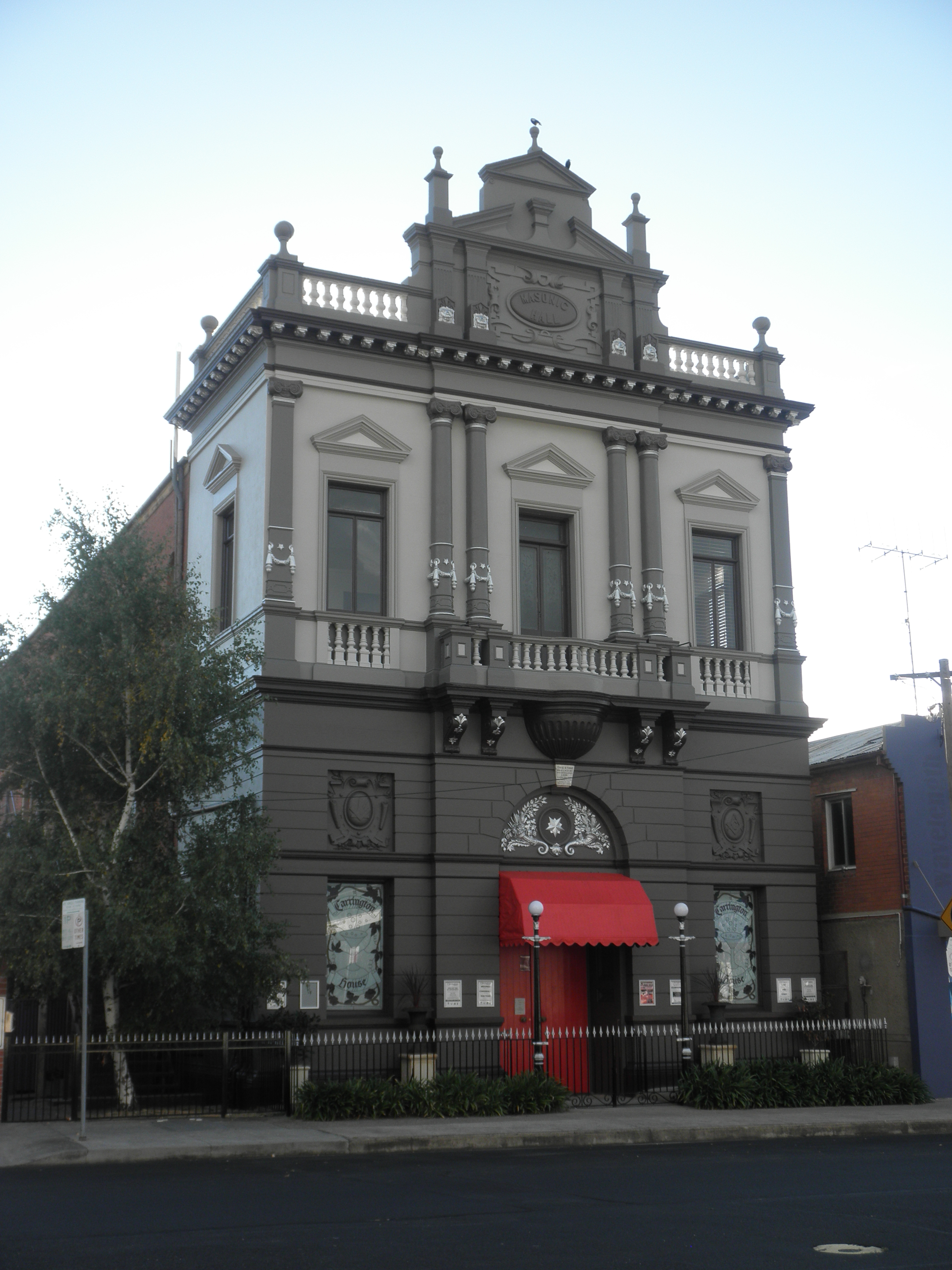
Carrington House; Bathurst. Completed 1890

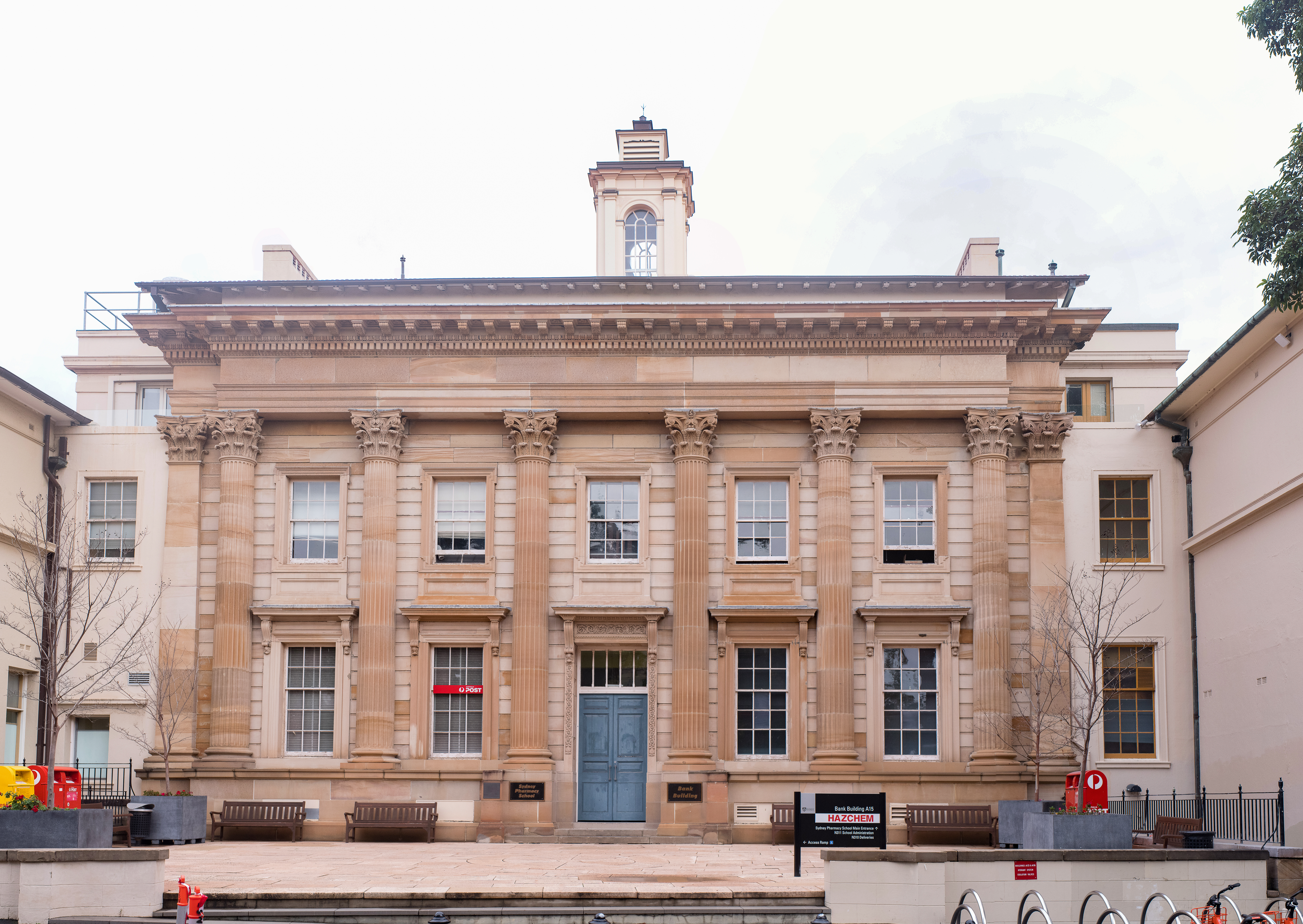
Sydney Pharmacy School, Camperdown.

=== Victorian Free Classical ===
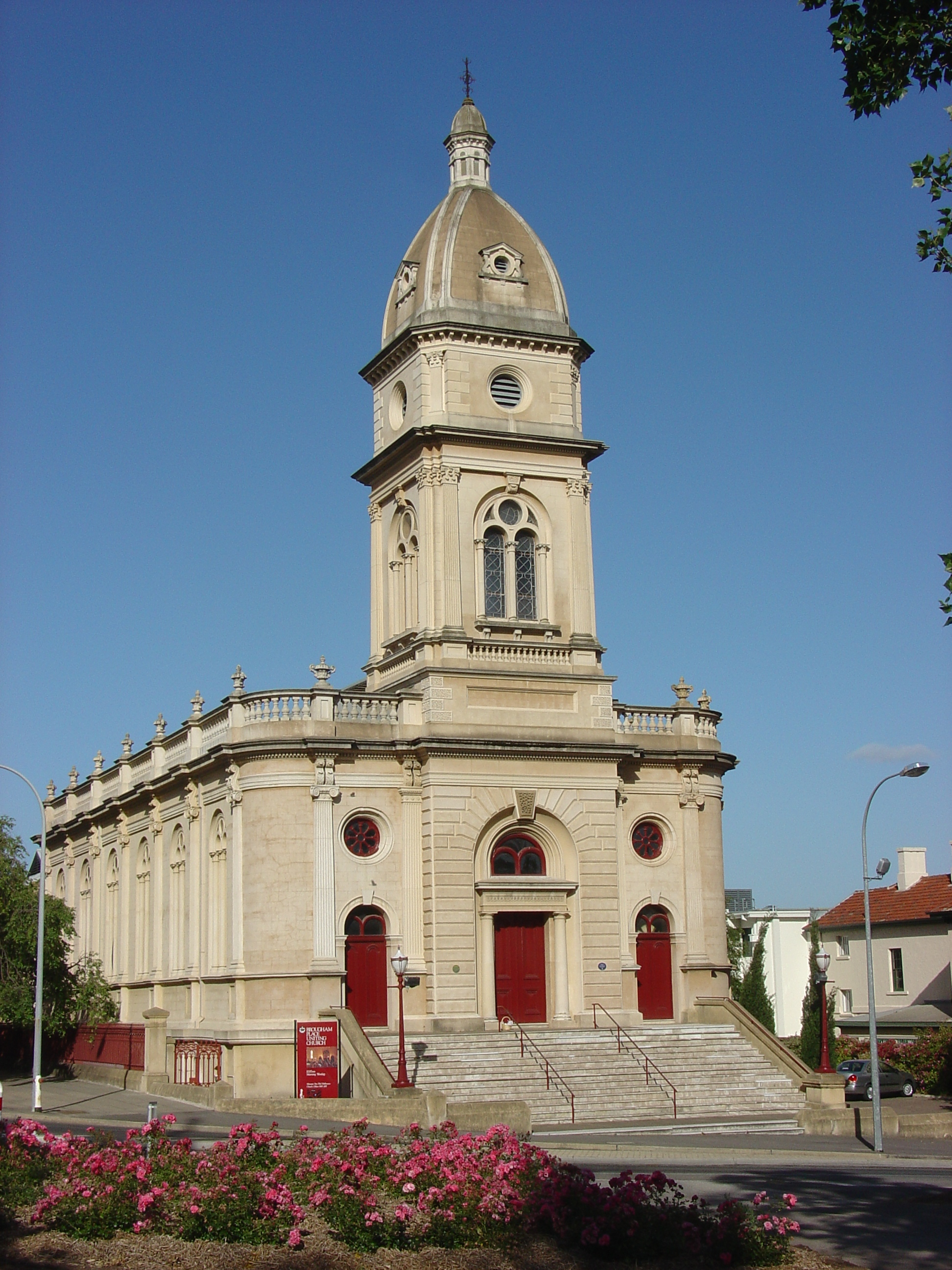
North Adelaide Congregational Church; built between in 1860–72

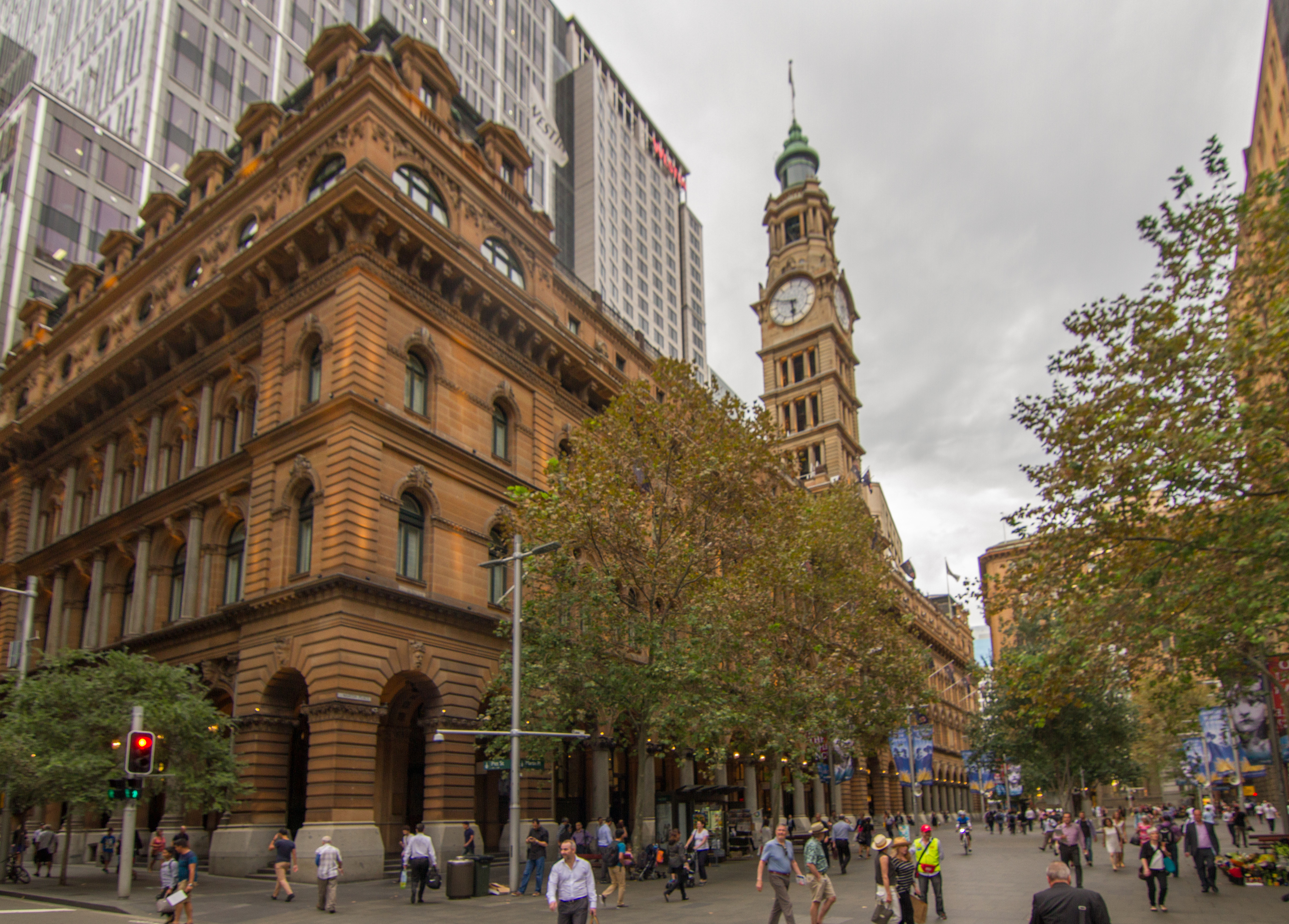
General Post Office, Sydney; built between 1866–91 and 1910 in the Free Classical and Italian Renaissance styles

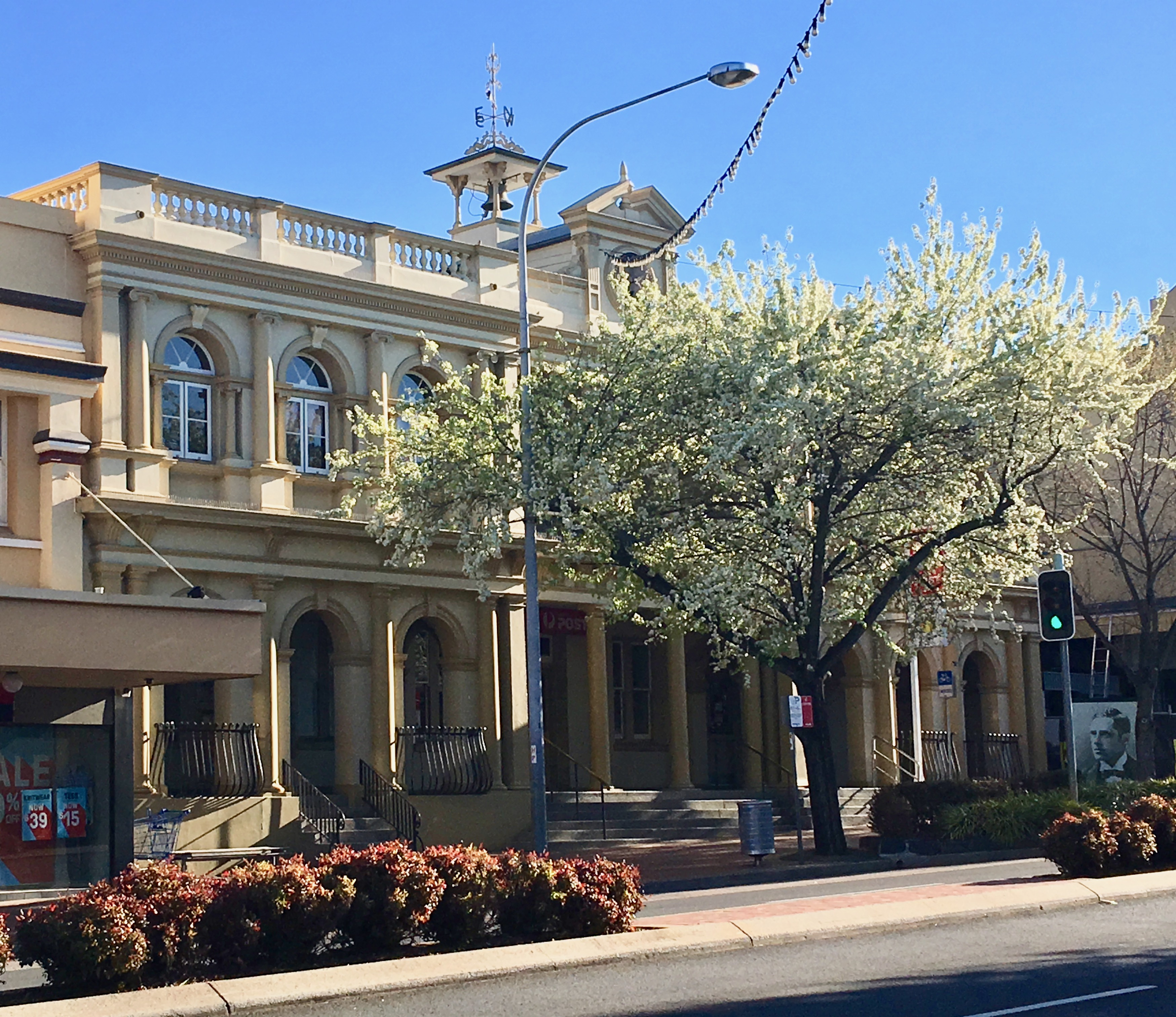
Orange Post Office. Completed 1879

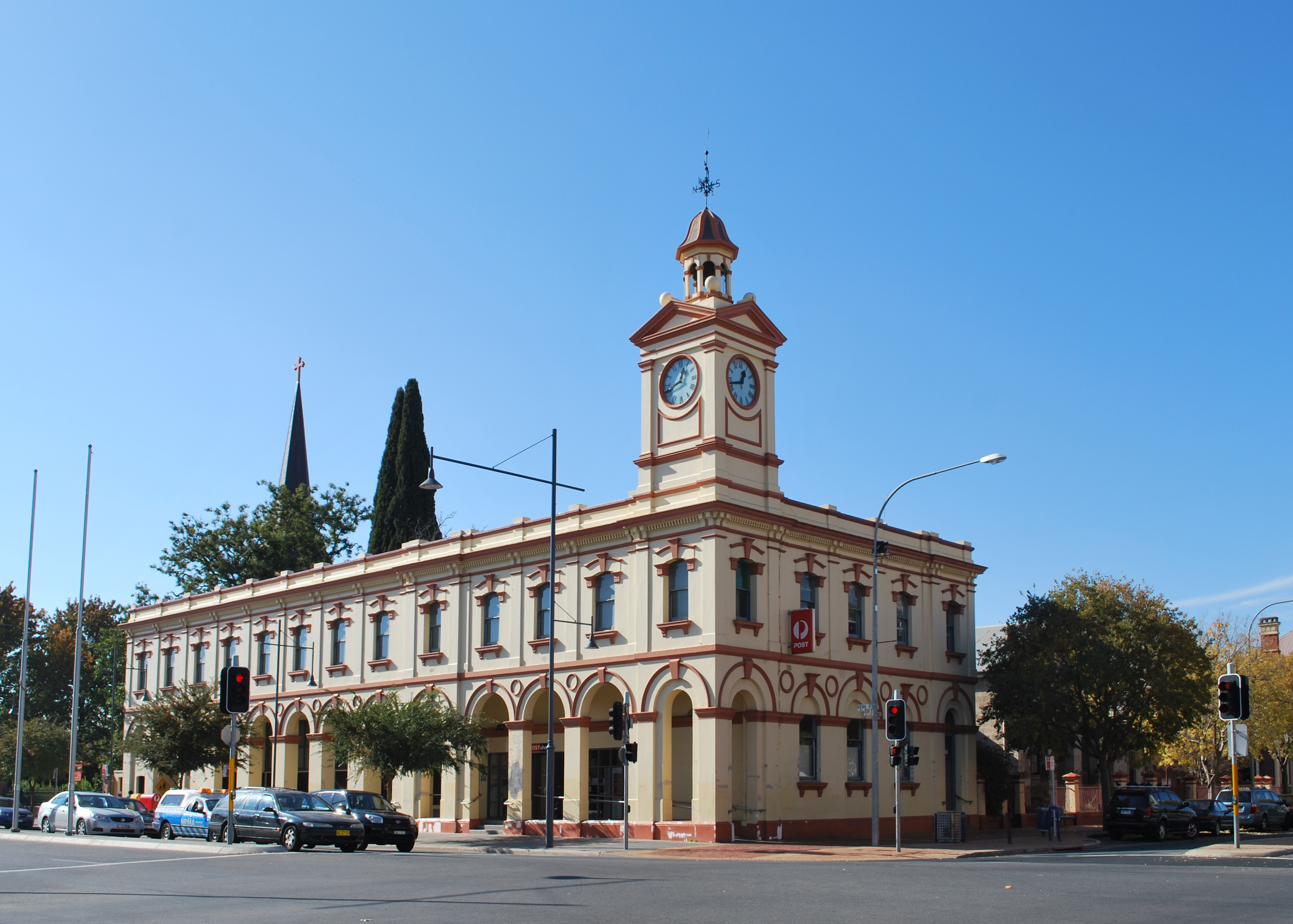
Albury Post Office, Albury. Completed 1880

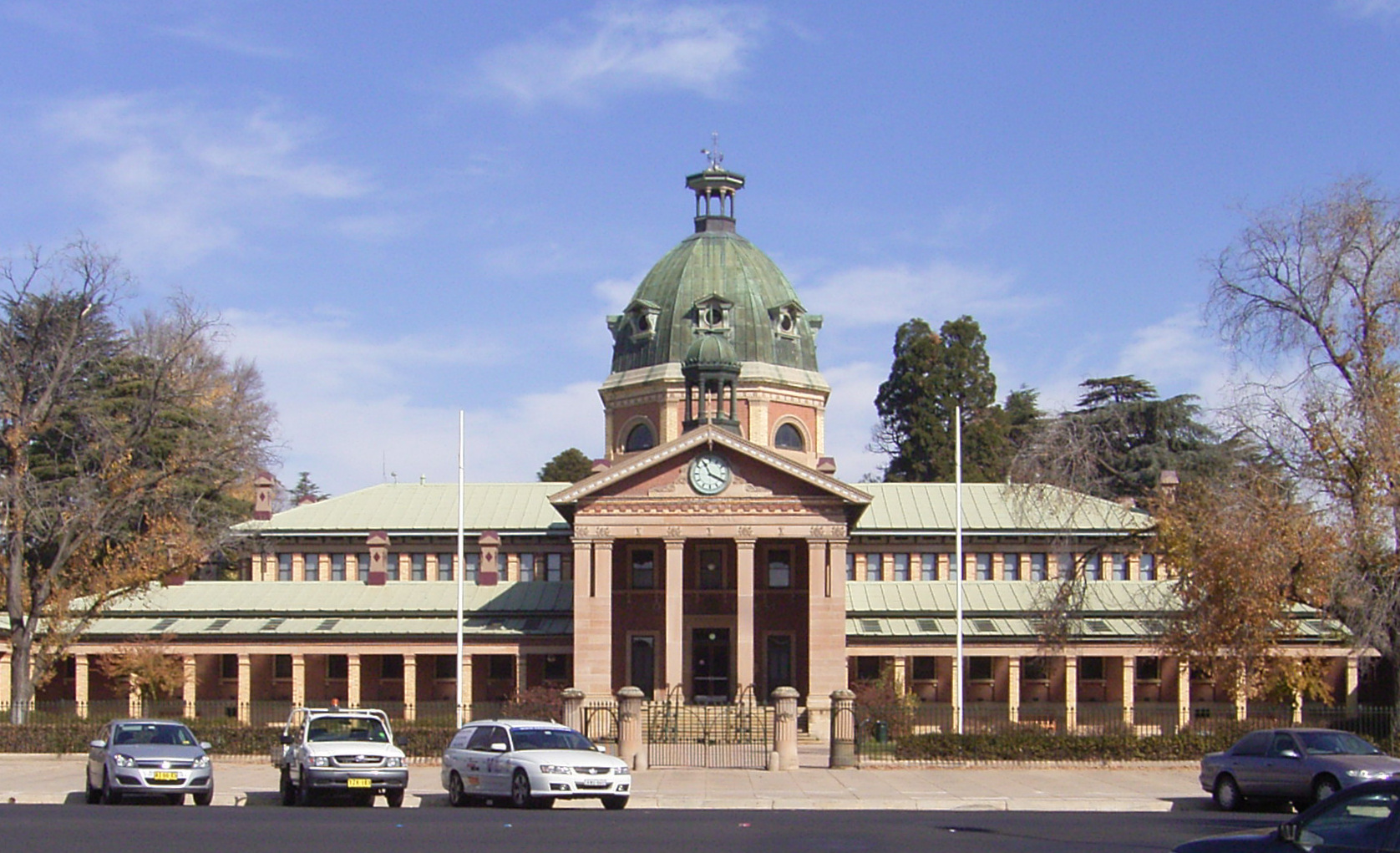
Bathurst Courthouse, Bathurst. Completed 1880

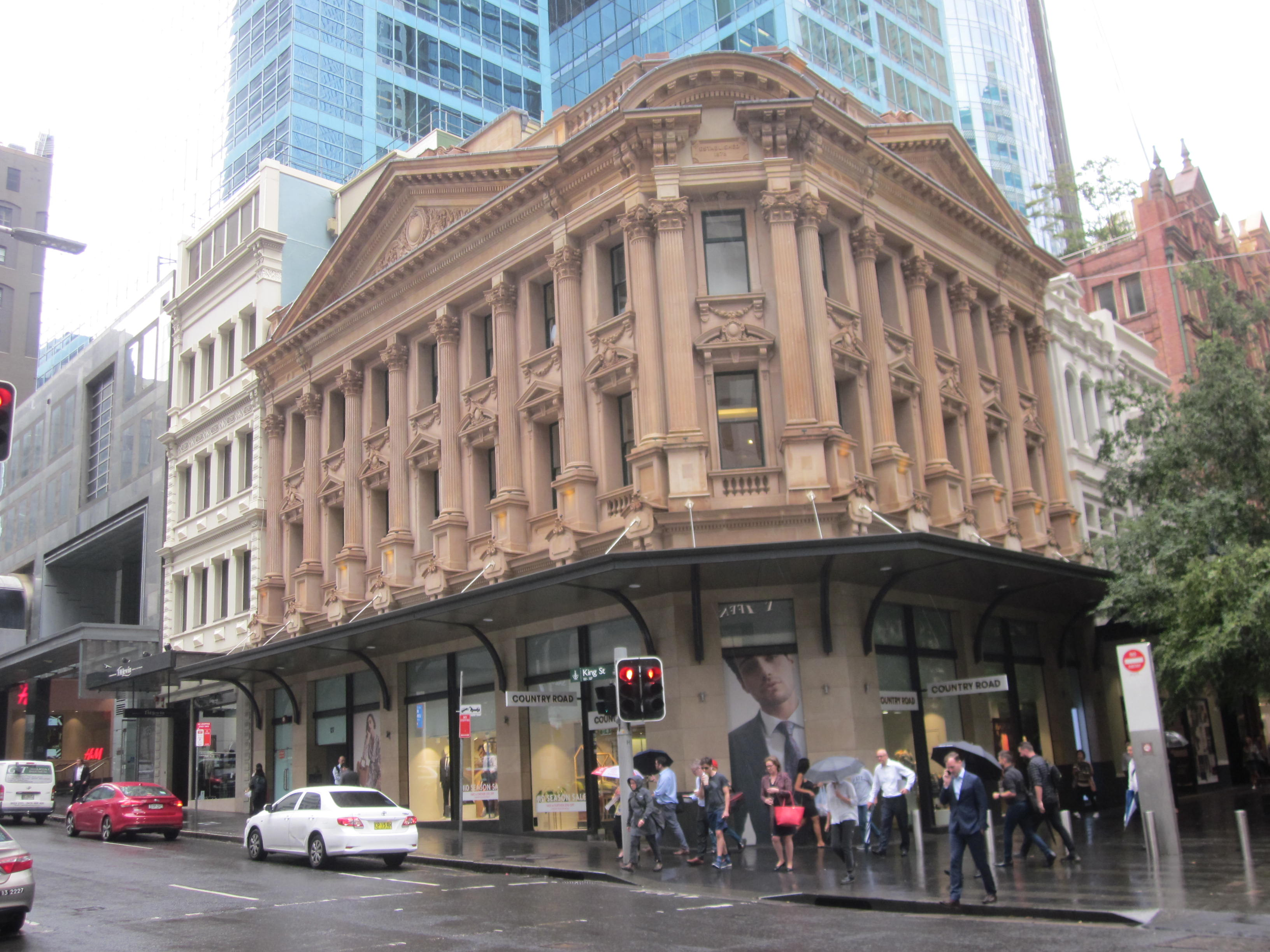
Grahame's Corner, Sydney. Completed 1882

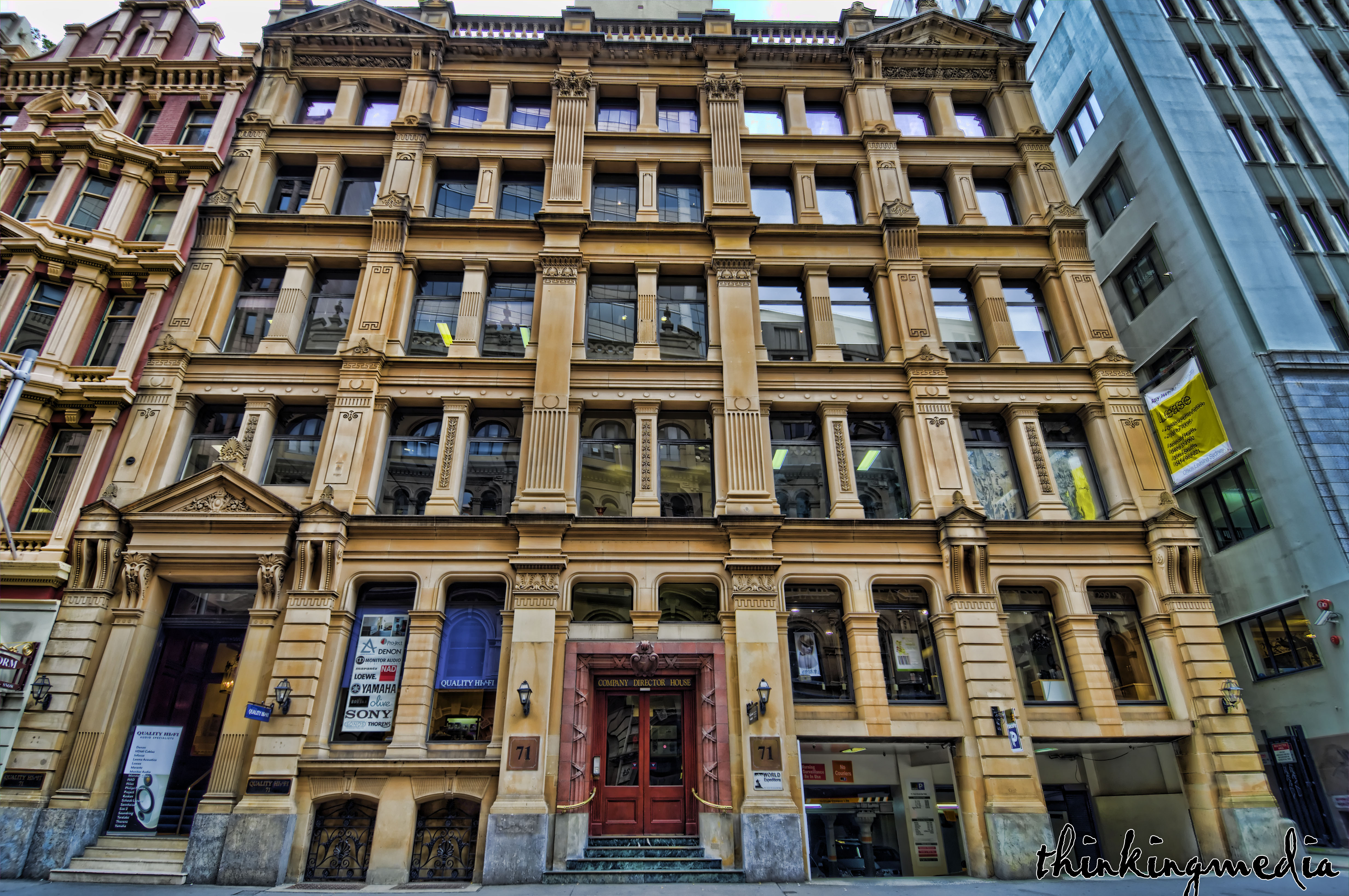
Gardiner House, Sydney. 1885

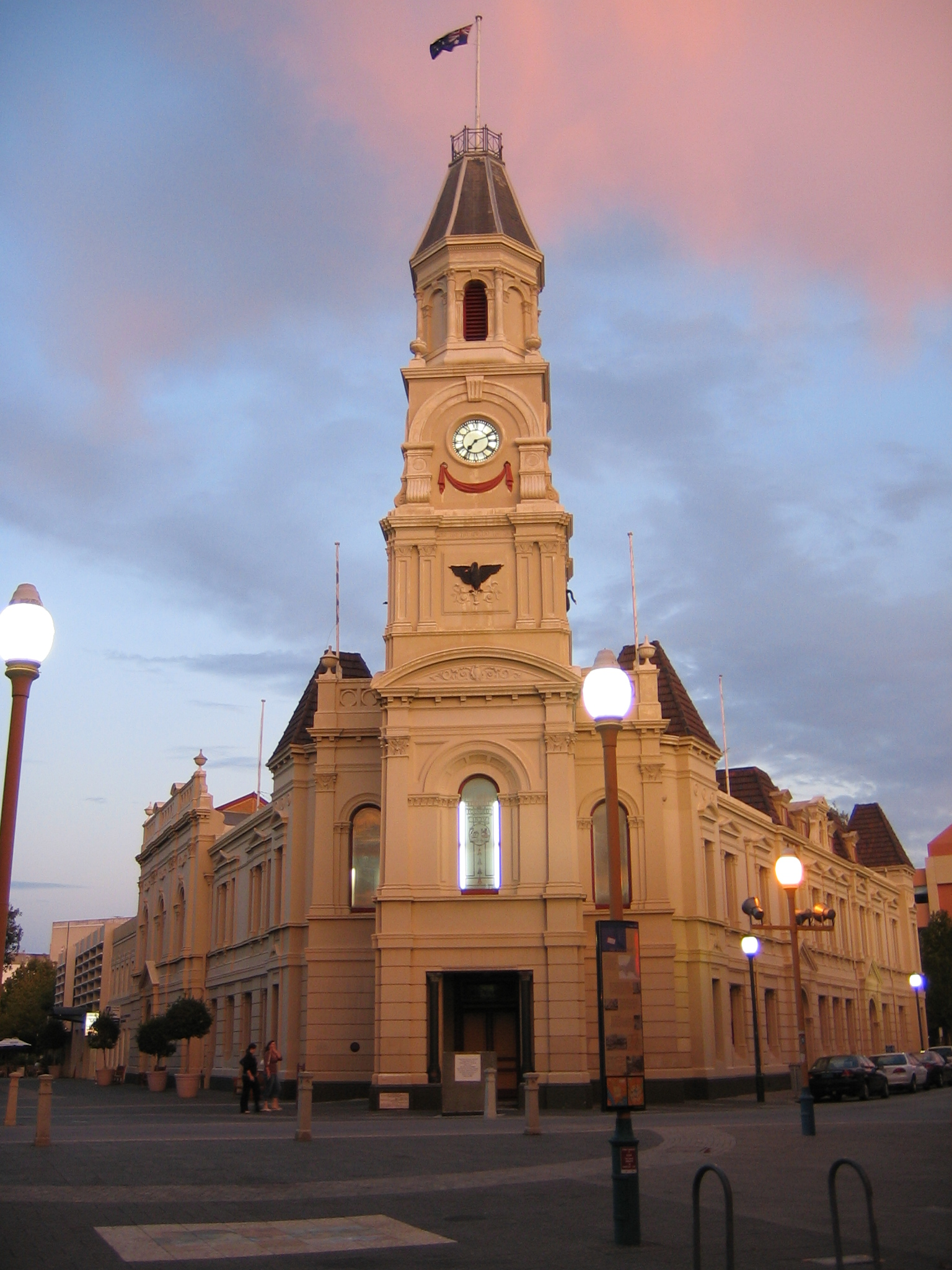
Fremantle Town Hall; built between 1885–87

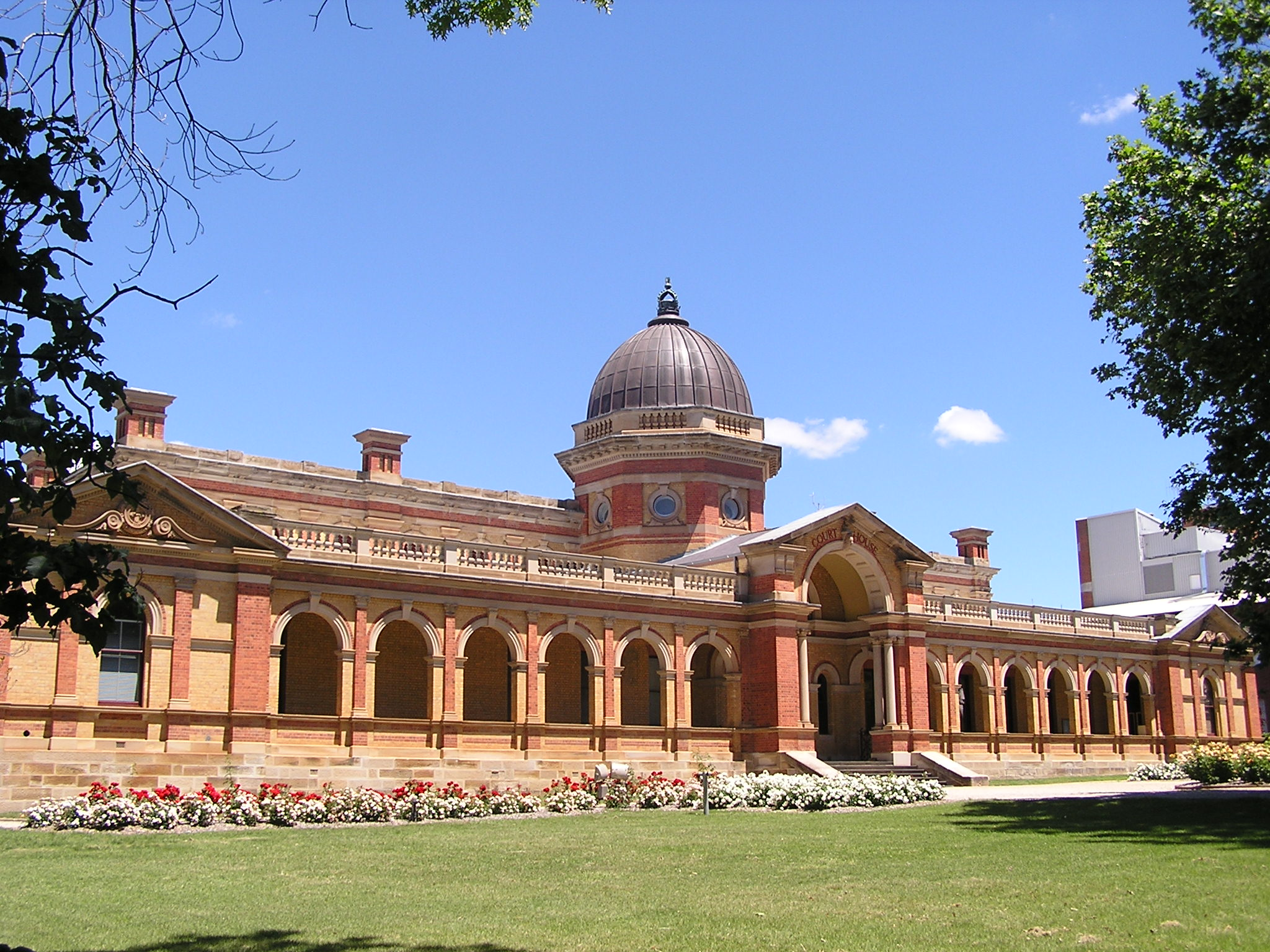
Goulburn Court House; built between 1885–87 and demonstrating Palladian concepts and Mannerist influences

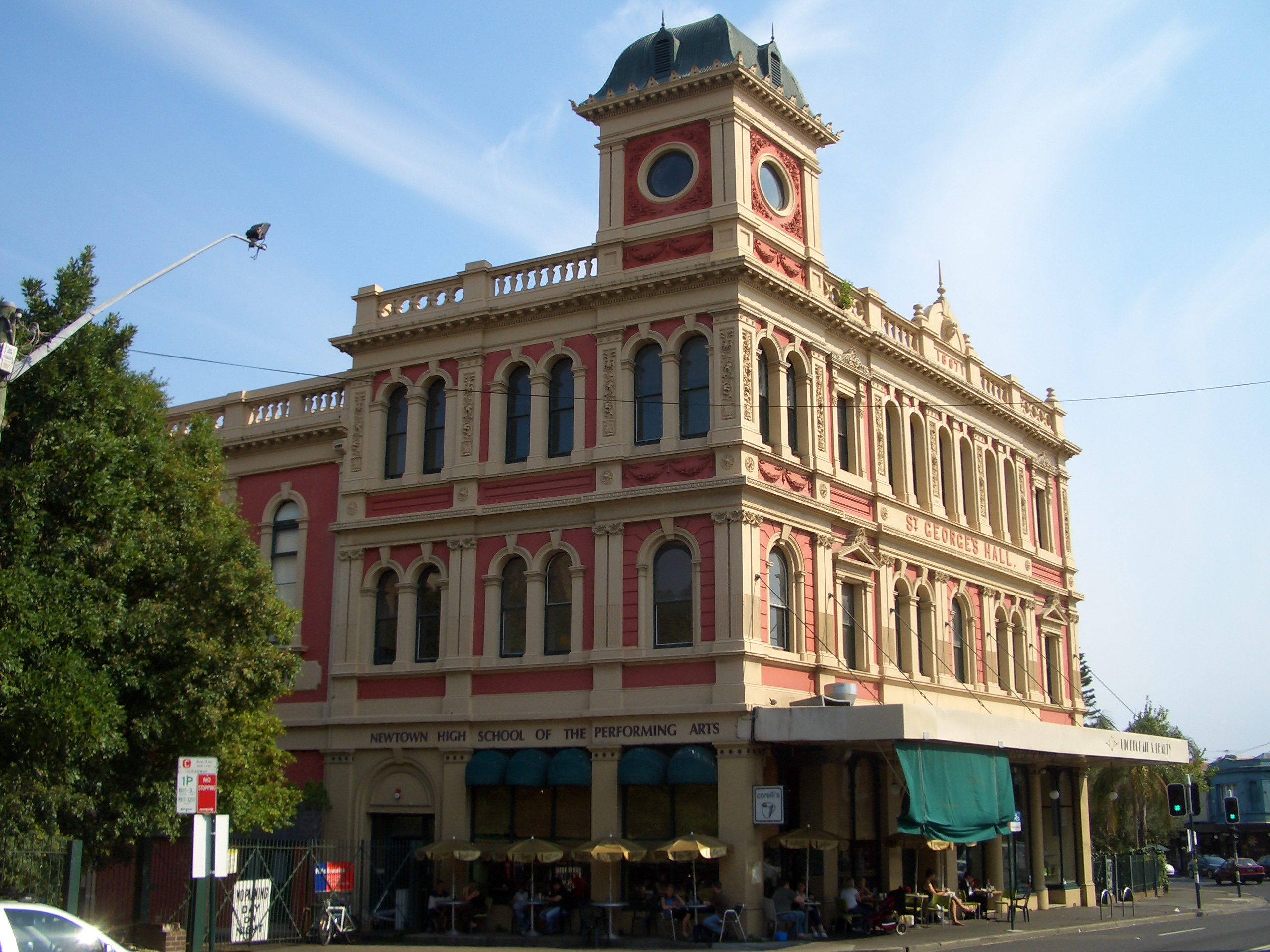
St Georges Hall, Newtown. Completed 1887

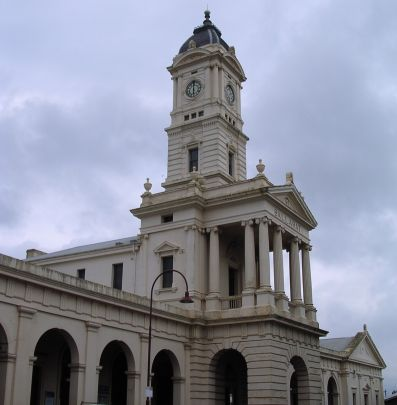
Ballarat railway station; completed in 1888

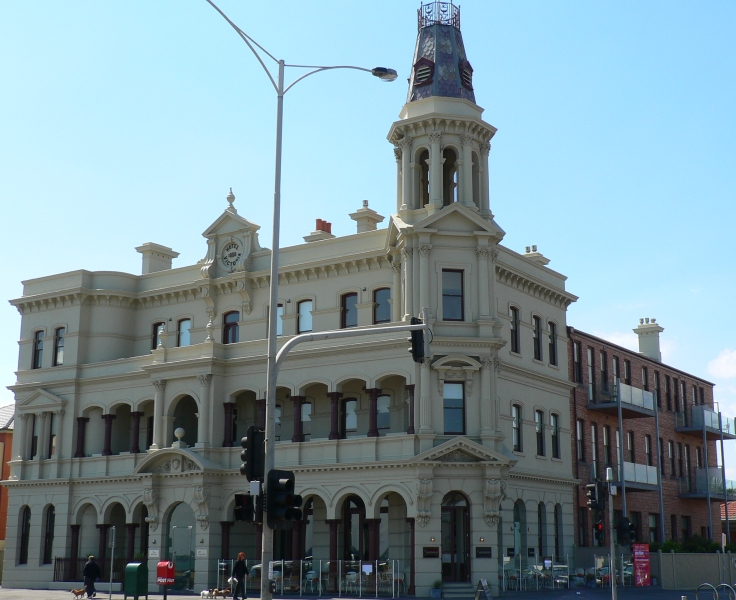
Victoria Hotel in Albert Park, Victoria; completed 1888

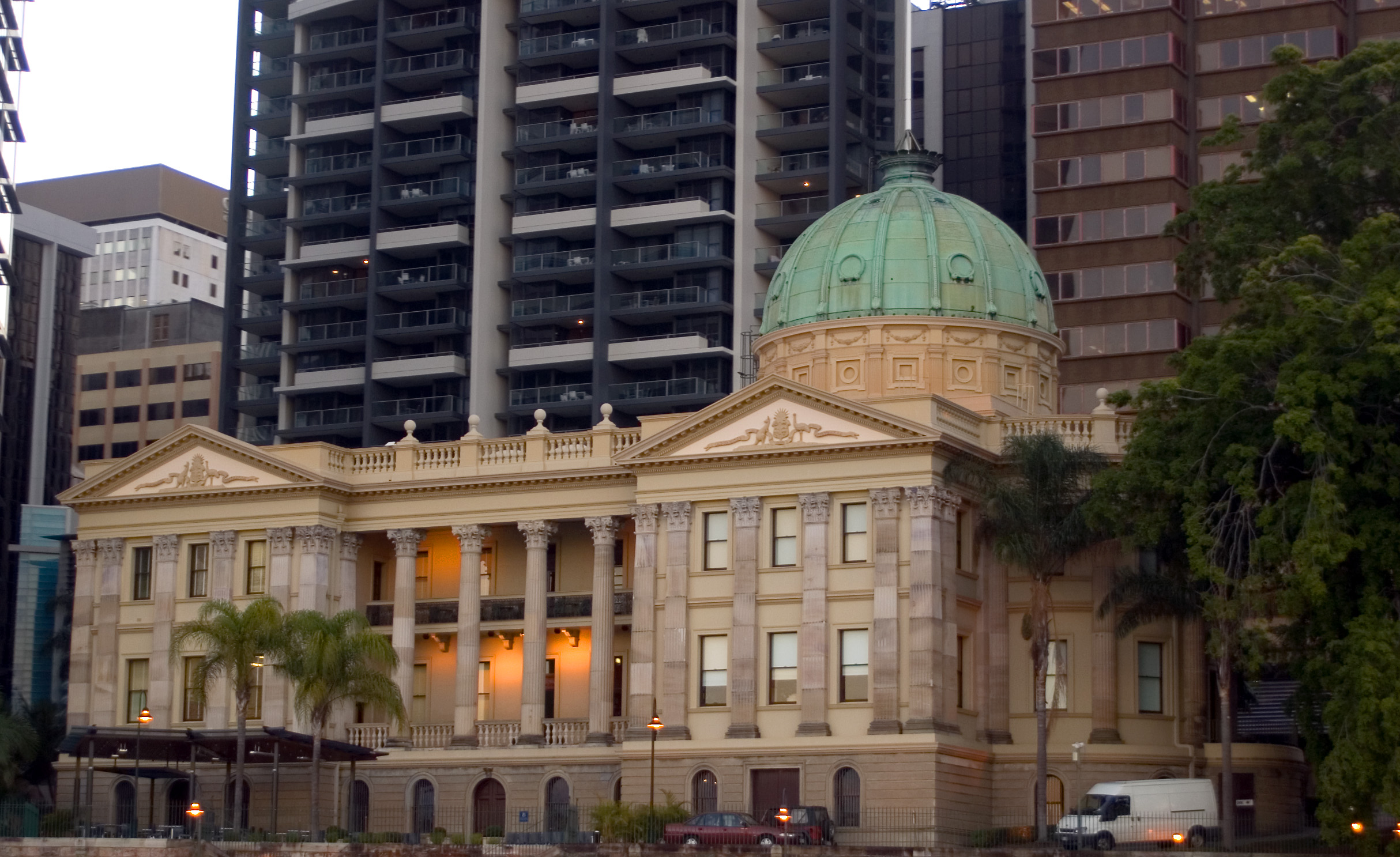
Customs House, Brisbane; completed 1889

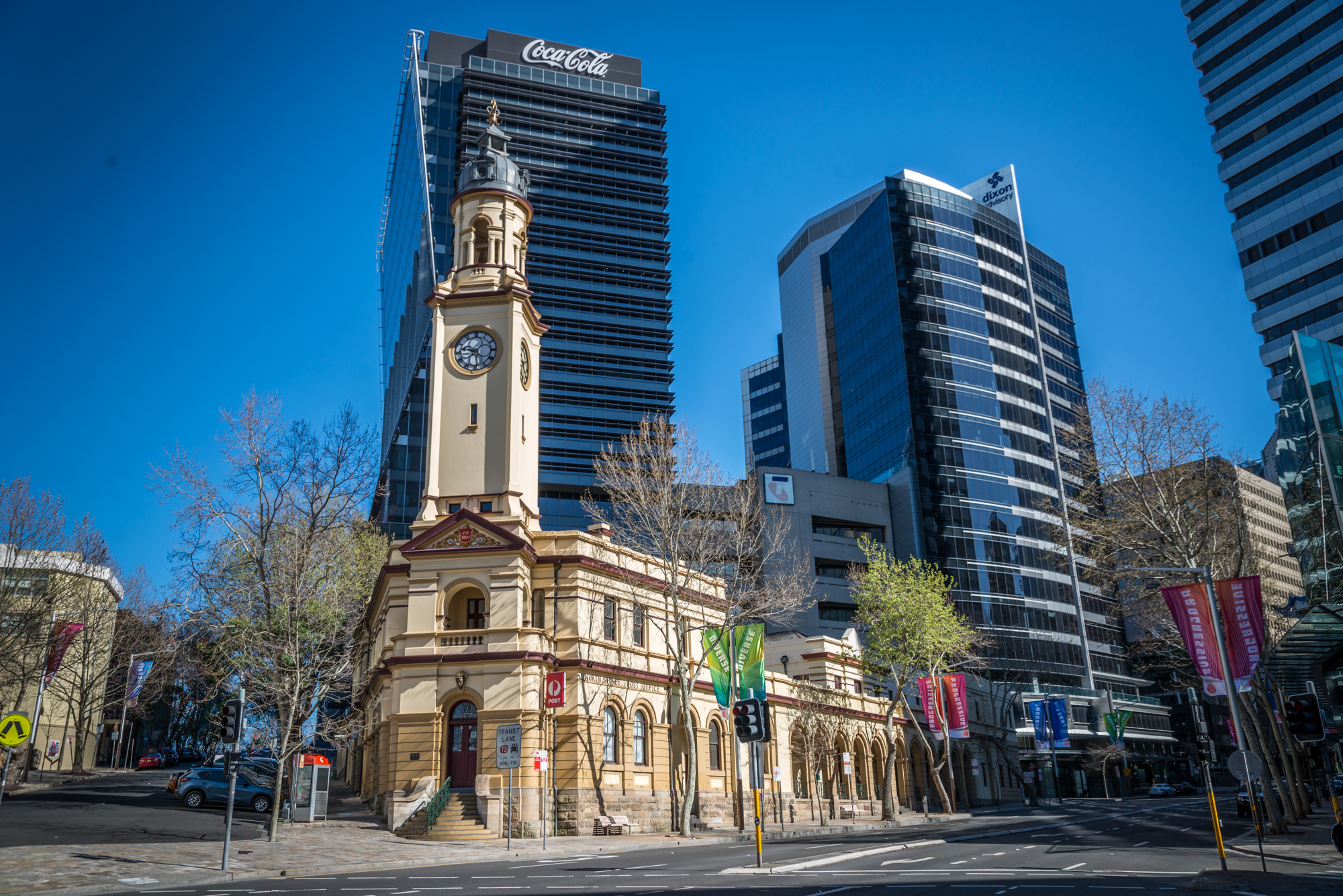
North Sydney Post Office; completed 1889

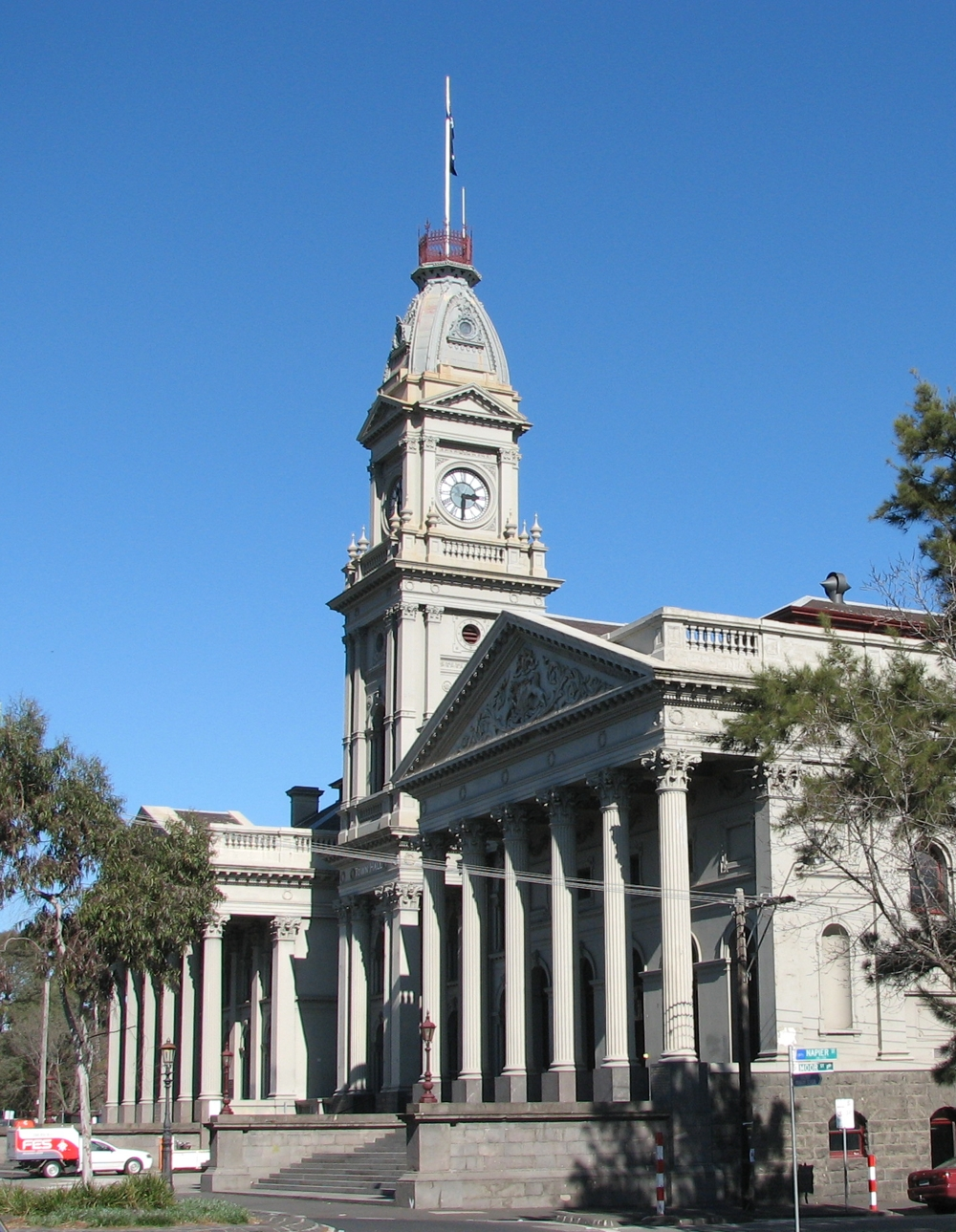
Fitzroy Town Hall, Melbourne; completed in 1890

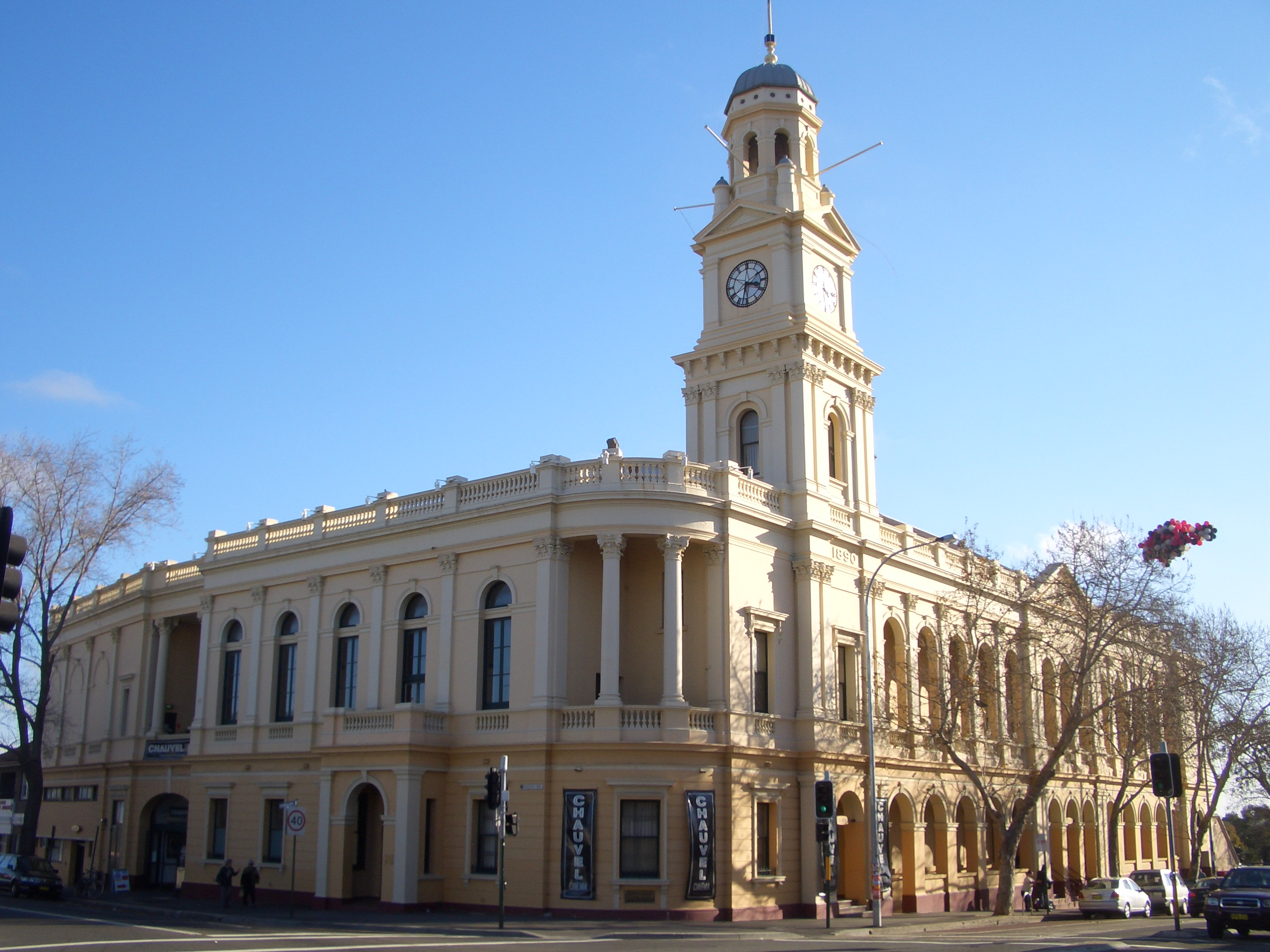
Paddington Town Hall, Sydney; built between 1890-91

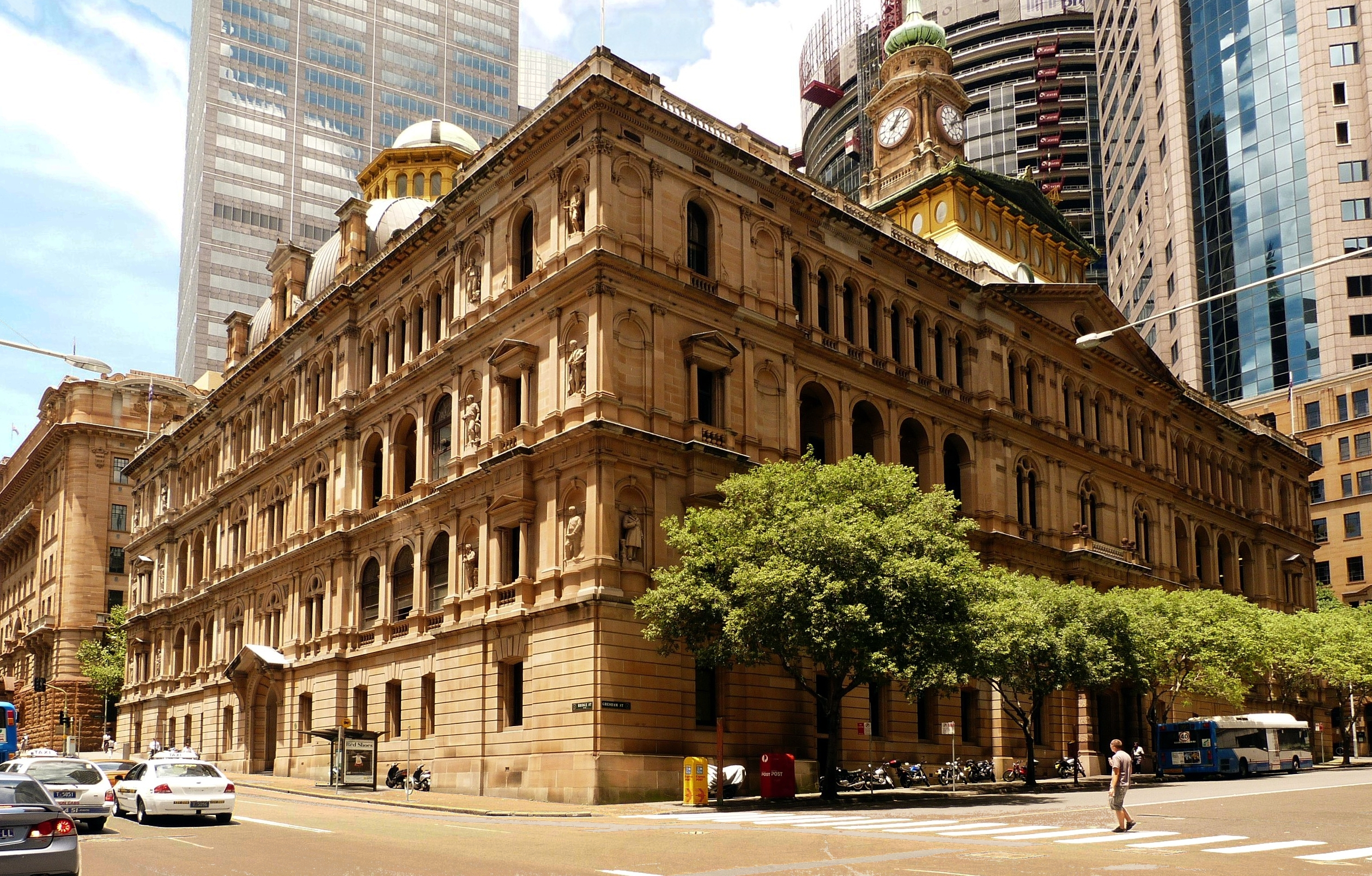
Department of Lands building, in Bridge Street, Sydney, constructed between 1876 and 1892.

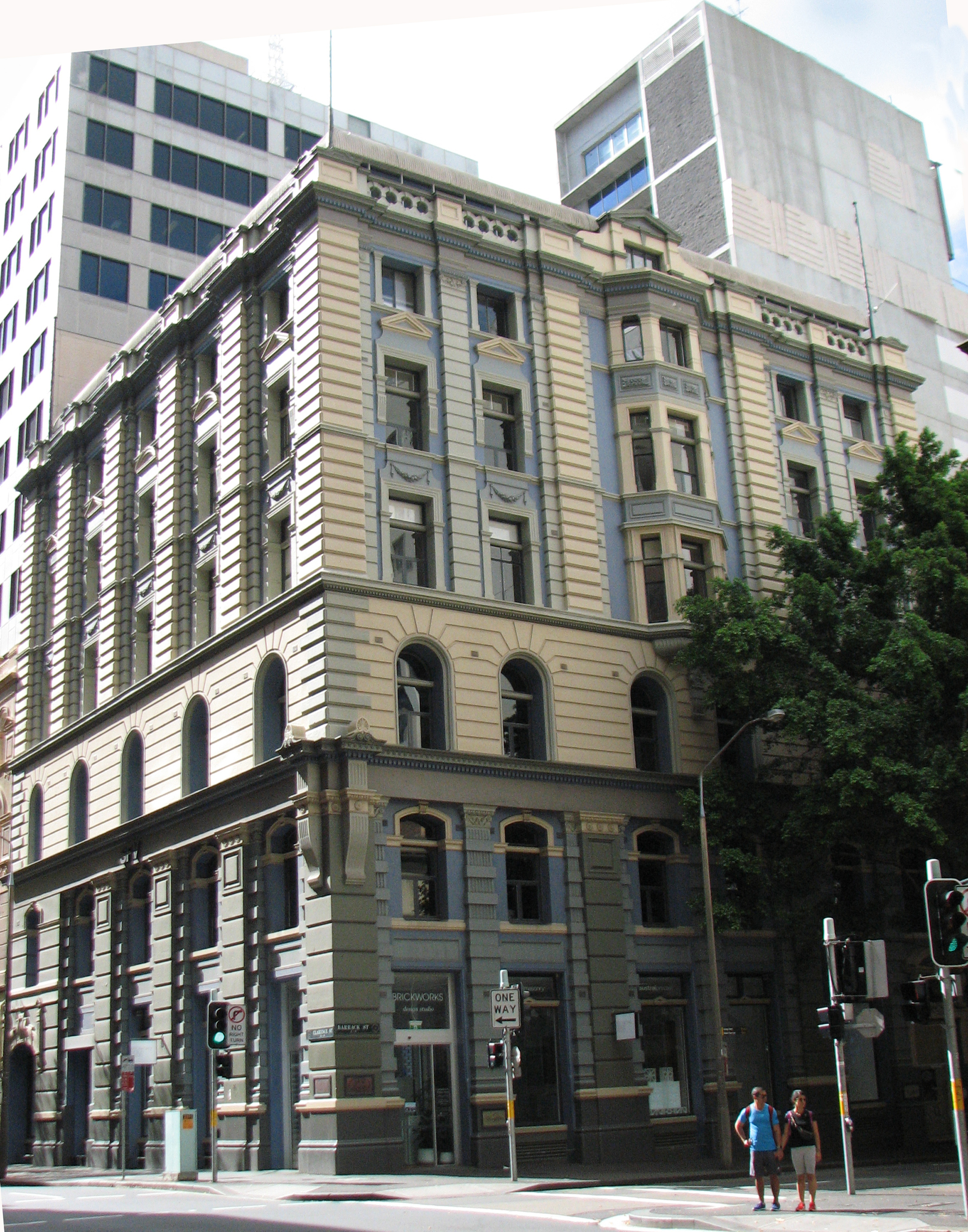
Pinnacle House, Sydney. Completed 1892

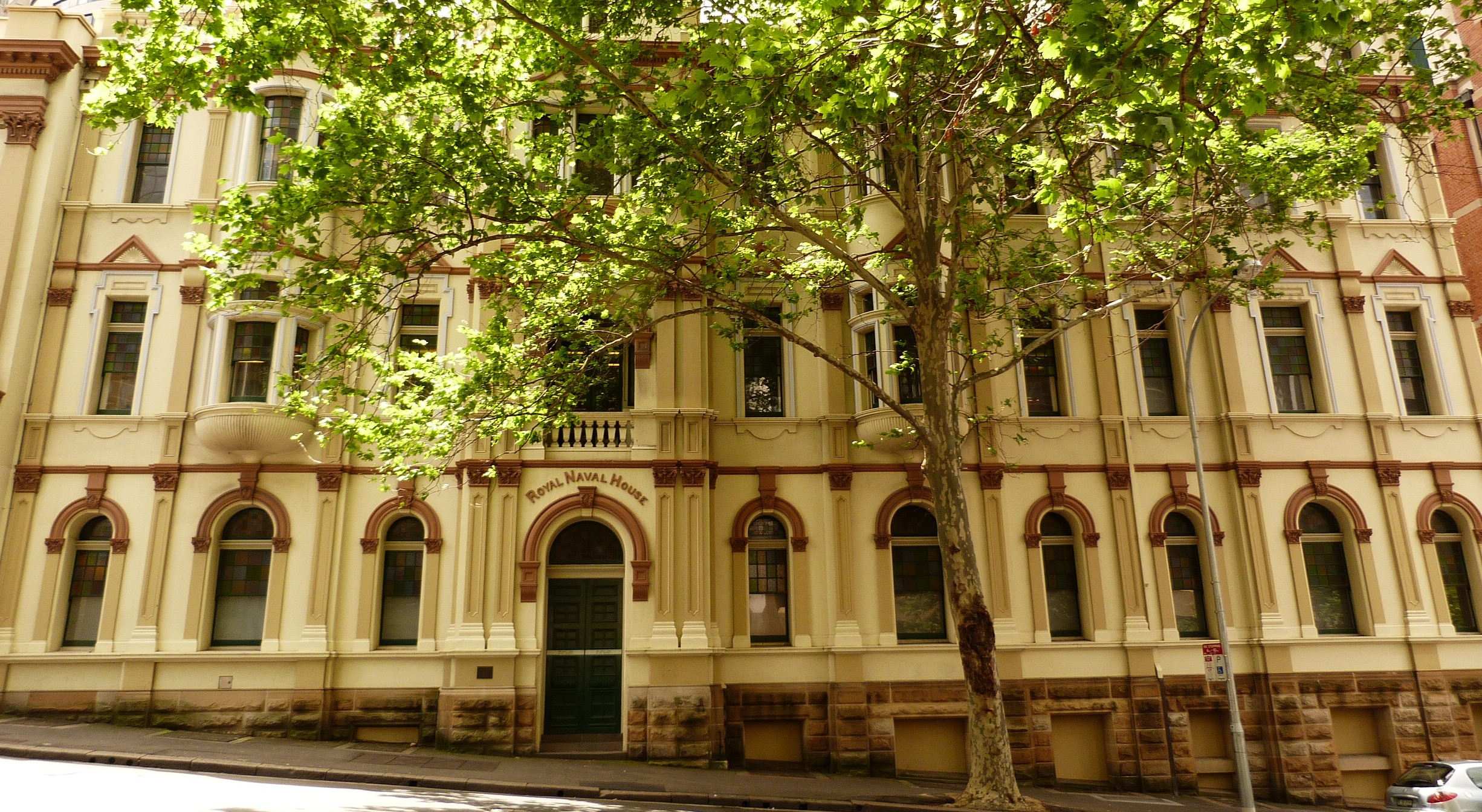
Royal Naval House, Sydney. Completed 1890s

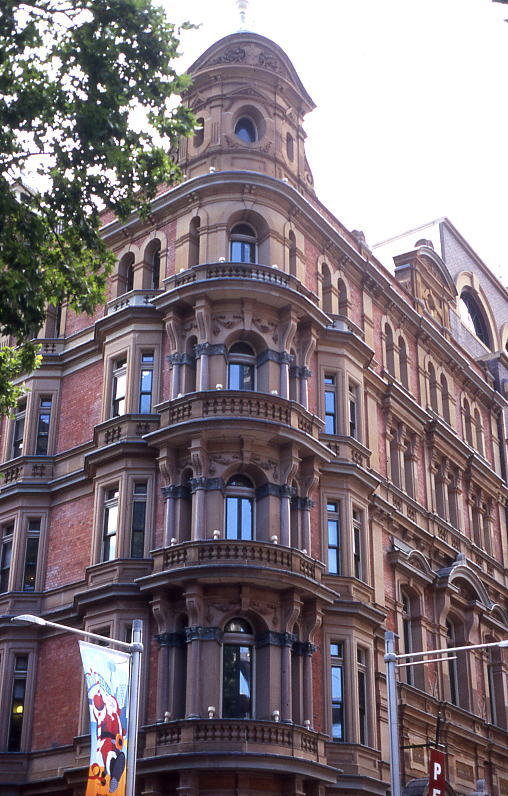
Hong Kong House, Sydney central business district

=== Victorian Filigree ===
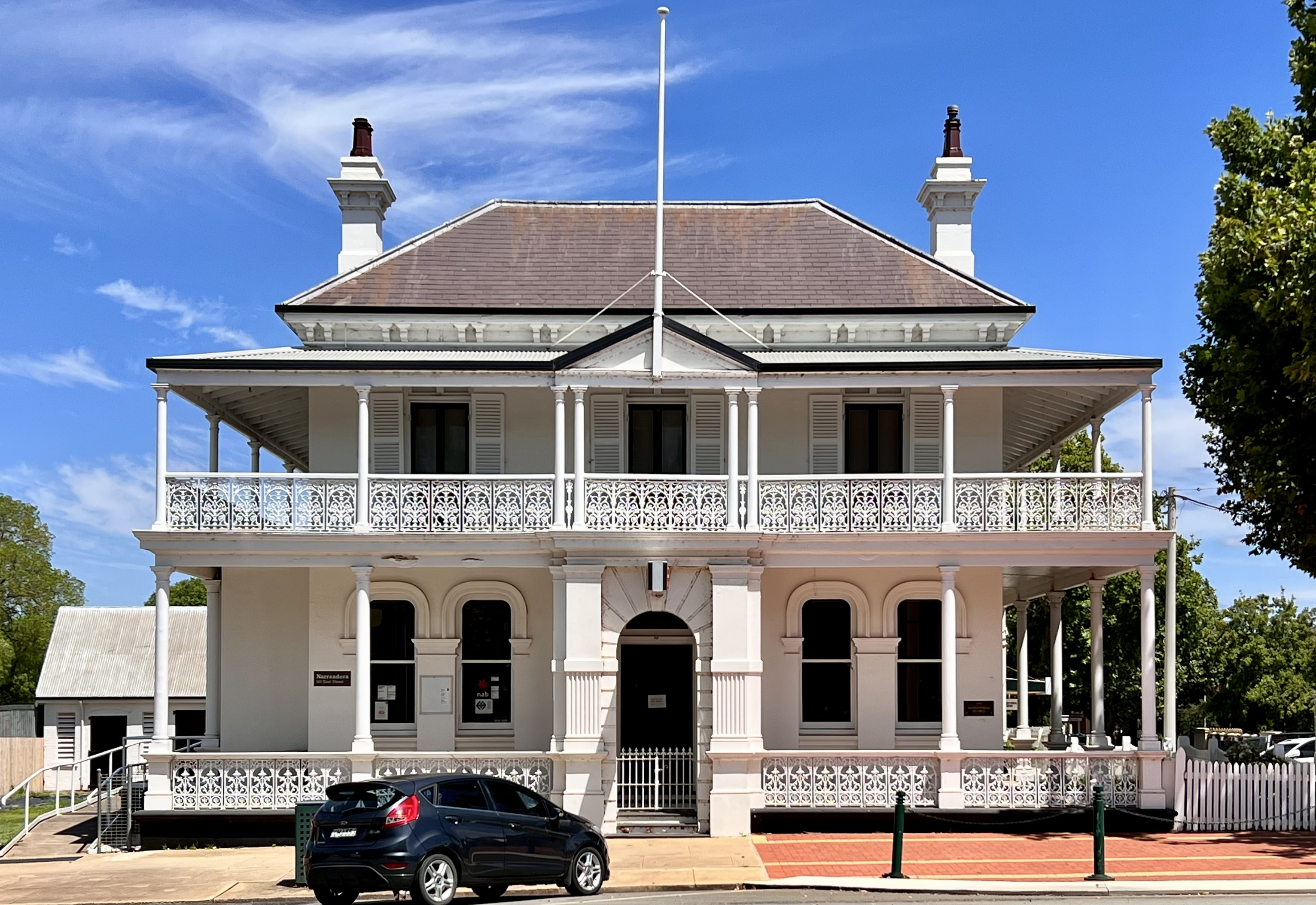
Commercial Banking Company of Sydney Bank Building, Narrandera. Built 1884–1885.

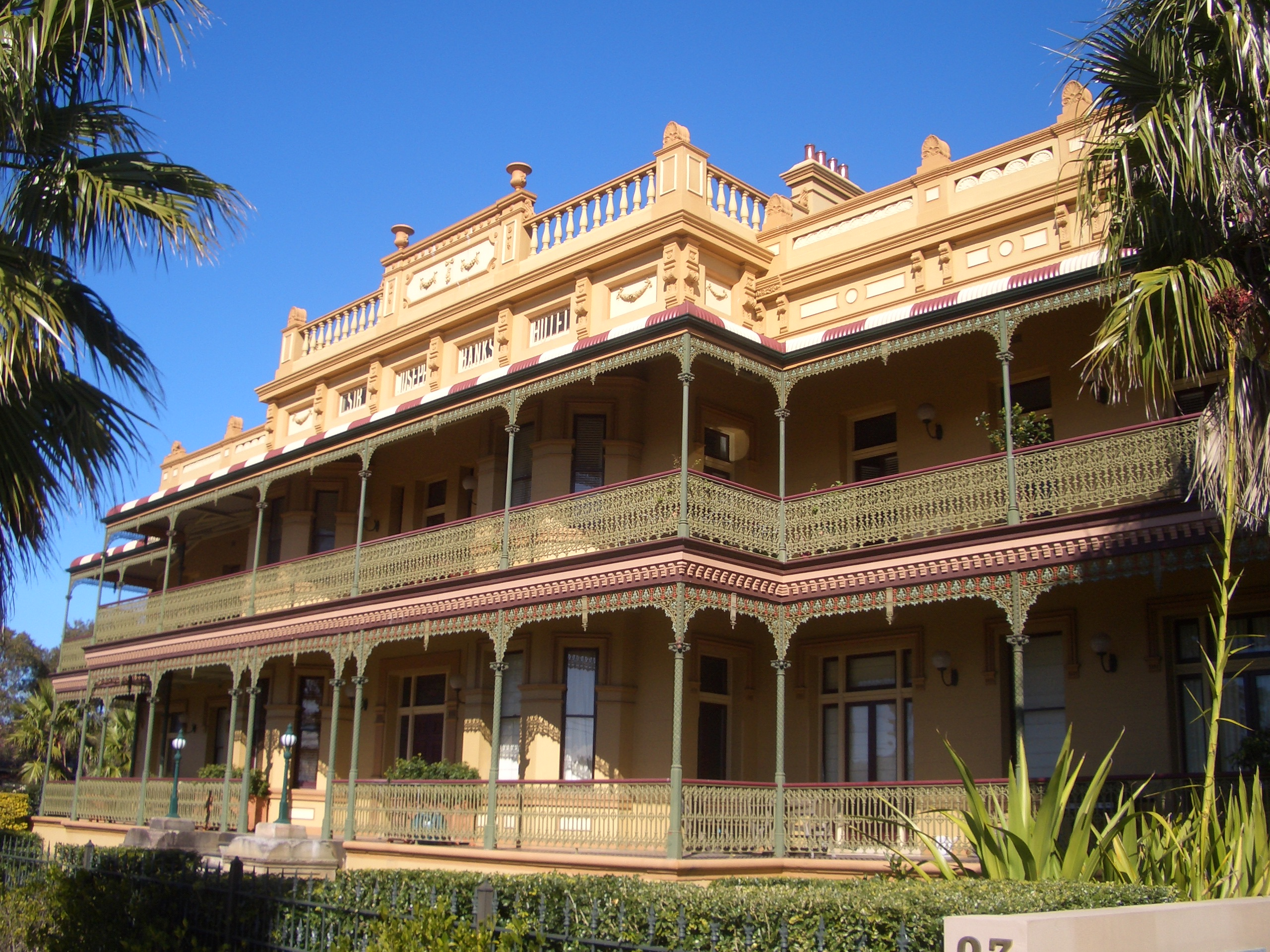
Old Sir Joseph Banks Hotel, Botany. Italianate Filigree style completed c.1884.

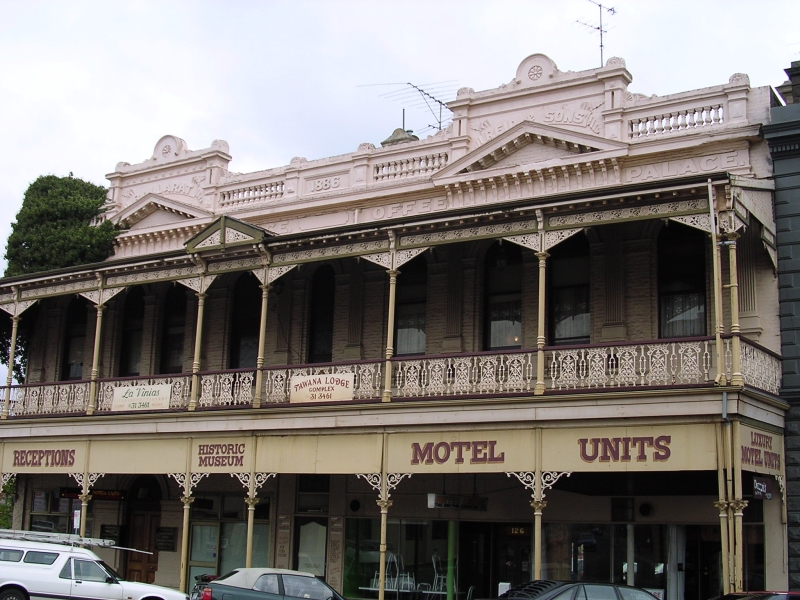
Reid's Coffee Palace, Ballarat; completed 1886

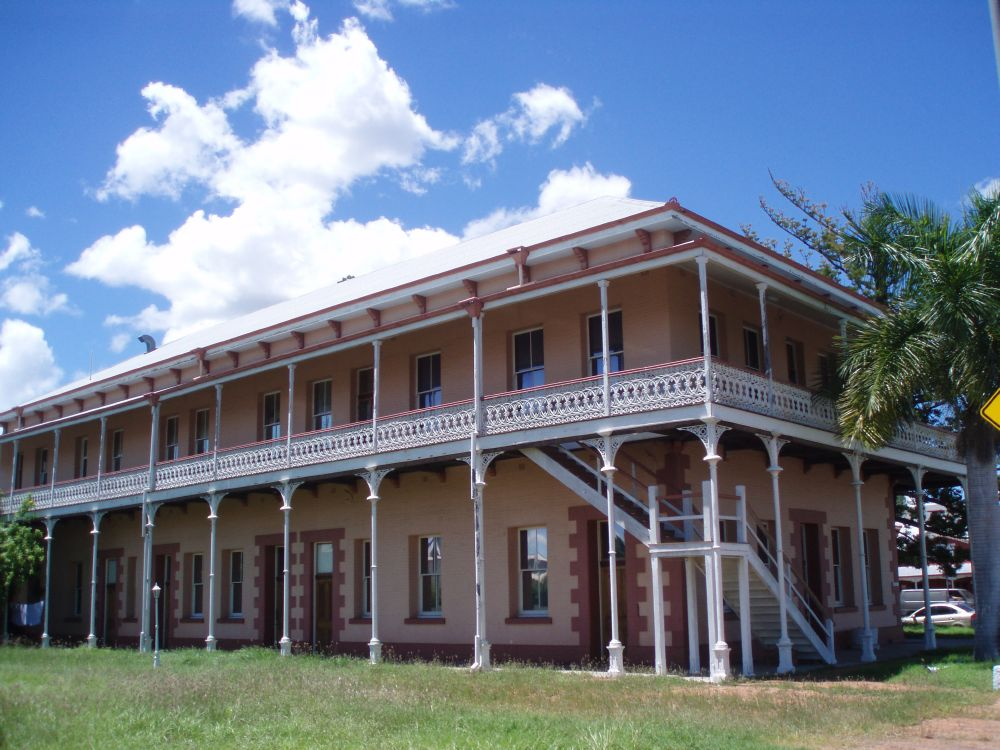
Railway Administration Building, Rockhampton. Built 1886.

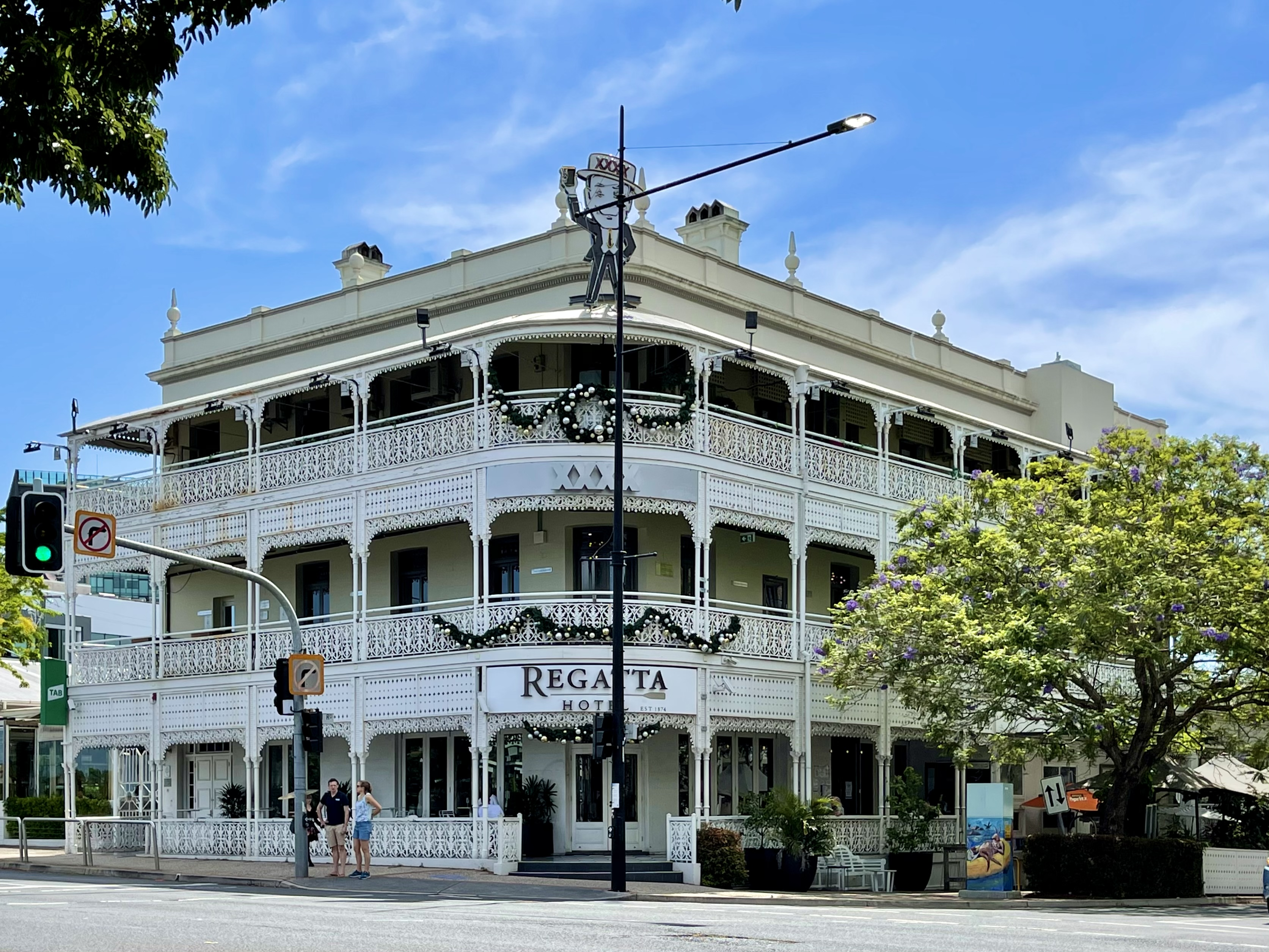
Regatta Hotel, Brisbane, present building constructed in 1886. Richard Gailey, architect.

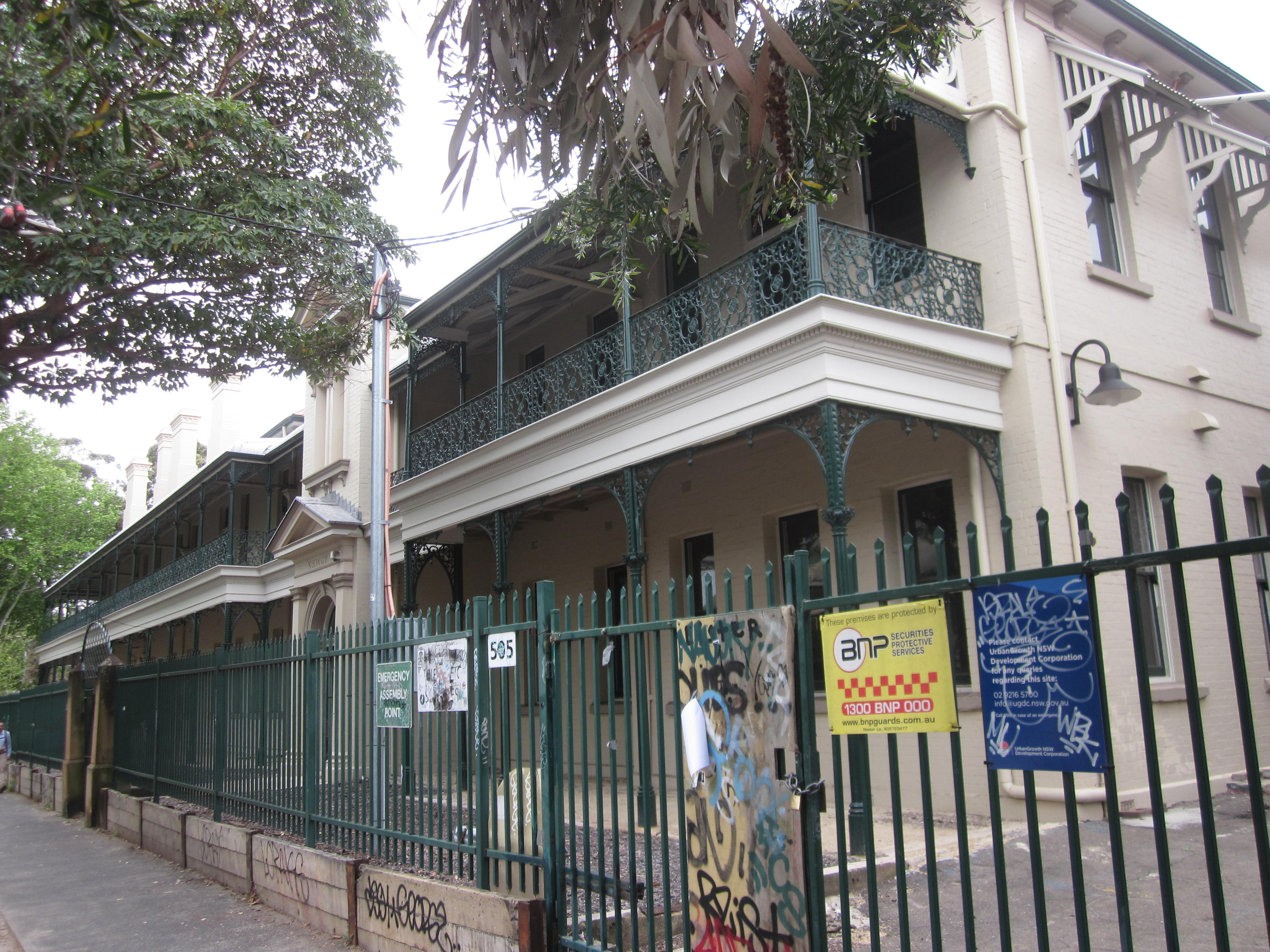
Chief Mechanical Engineer's office, Eveleigh; built 1887.

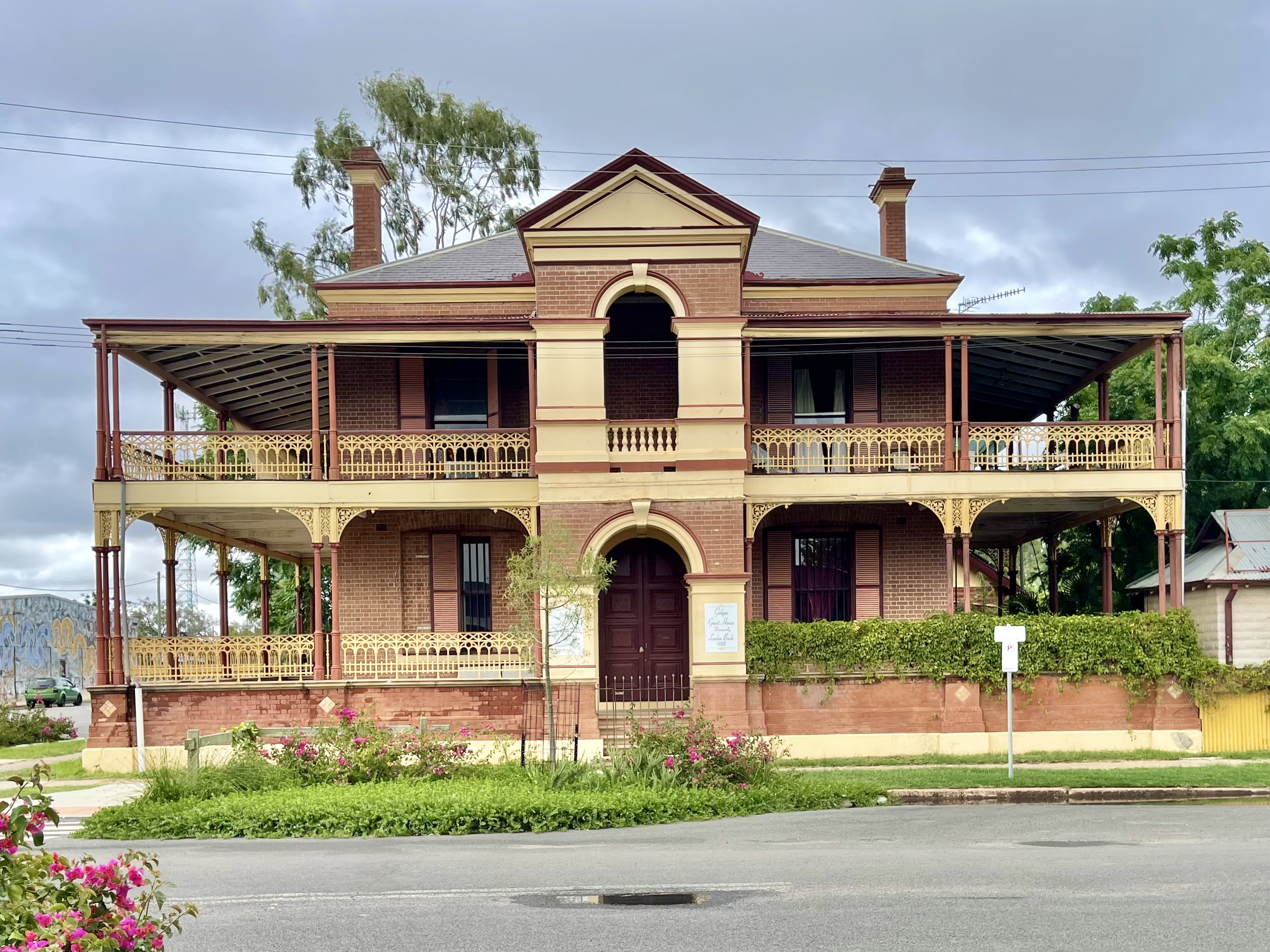
London Chartered Bank of Australia Building, Bourke. Completed 1888.

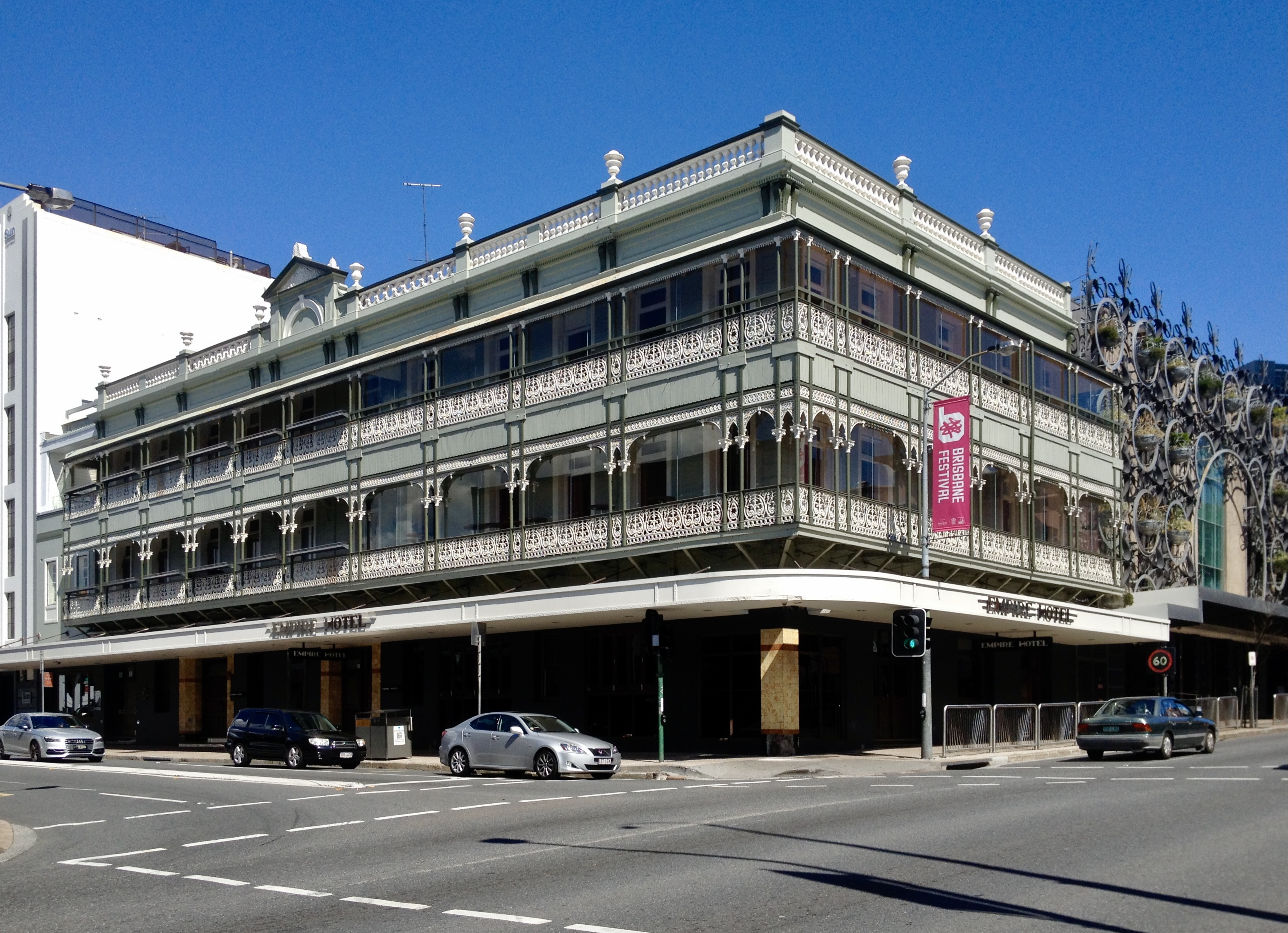
Empire Hotel, Fortitude Valley. Built in 1888 by Smith and Ball. Richard Gailey, architect.

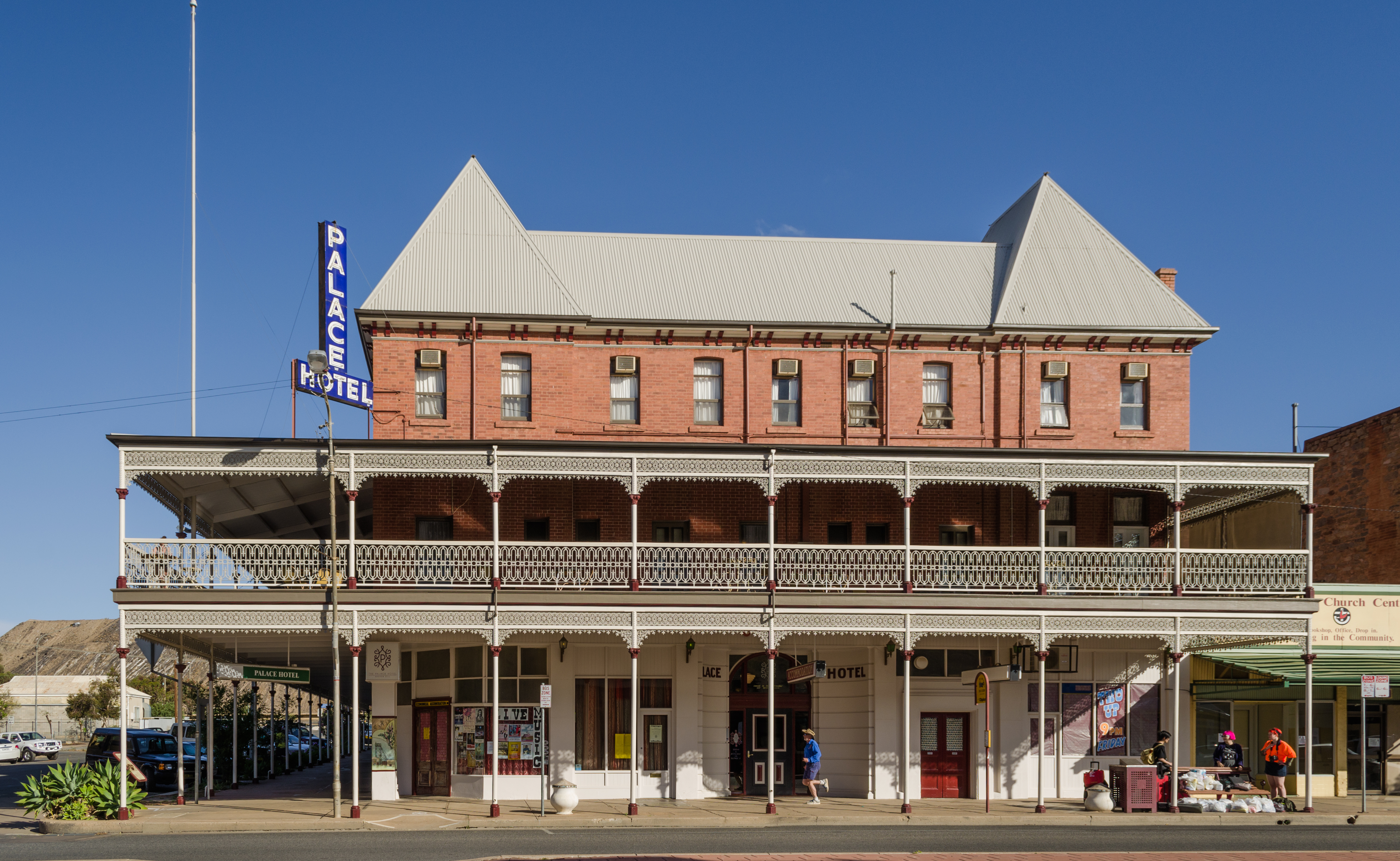
Palace Hotel, Broken Hill. Erected 1889. Alfred Dunn, architect.

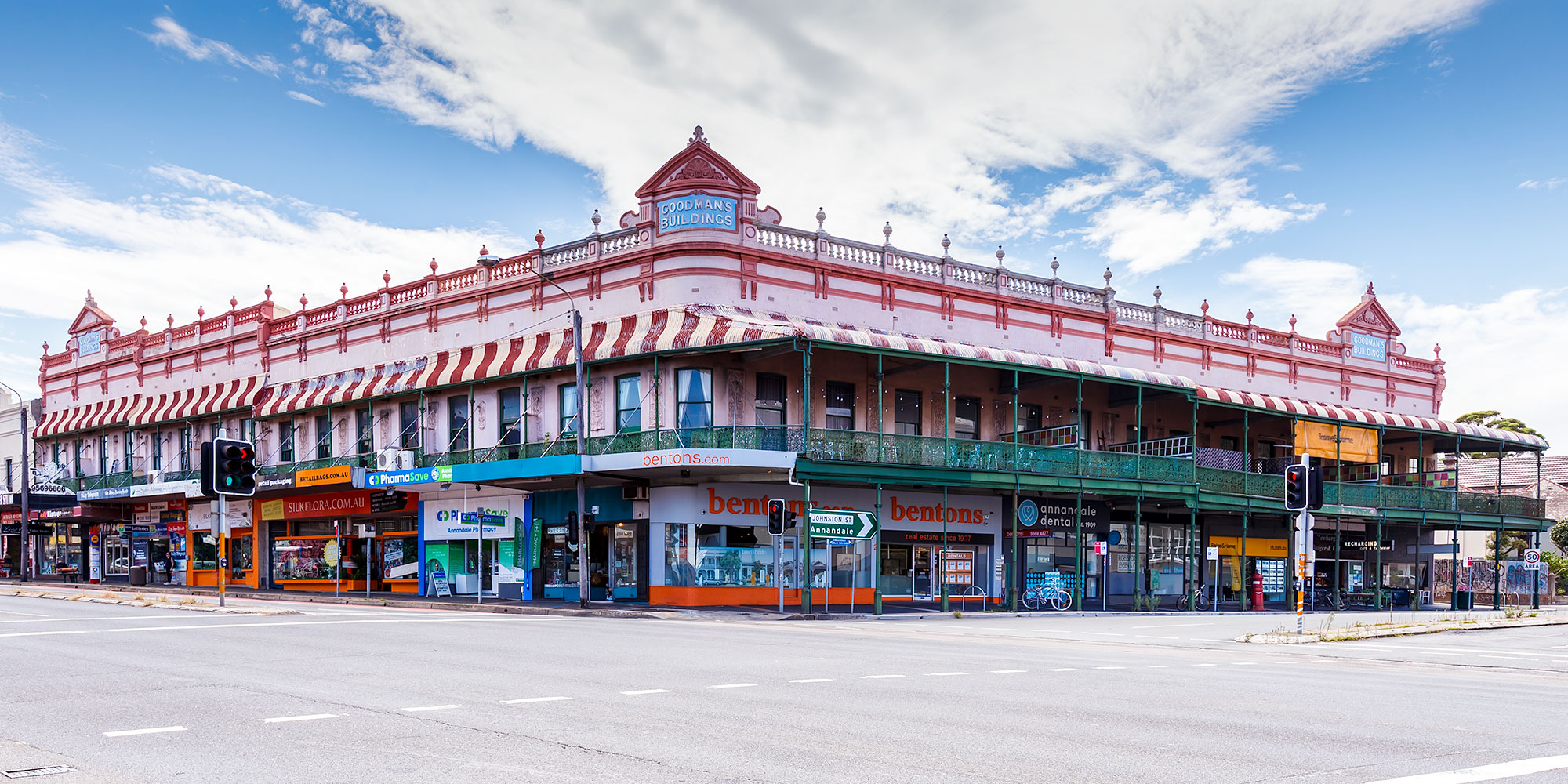
Goodman's Buildings, Annandale, constructed in stages between 1890–1912.

=== Victorian Mannerist ===
Notable examples in Australia include: Culwulla Chambers (Sydney); Old Police Station, The Rocks Block Arcade (Melbourne); Stalbridge Chambers (Melbourne), National Bank Pall Mall (Bendigo); RESI Chambers (Melbourne); Lygon Buildings, Medley Hall (Carlton, Victoria); Former Money Order Post Office and Savings Bank (Melbourne); Mutual Store (Melbourne);

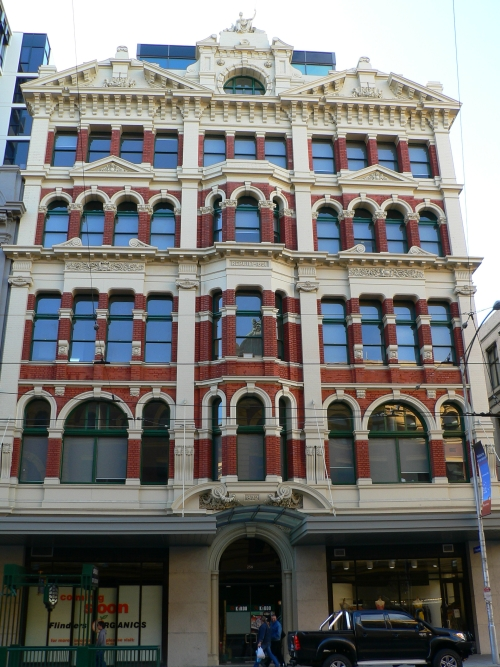
Former Mutual Store, Flinders Street, Melbourne; completed 1891

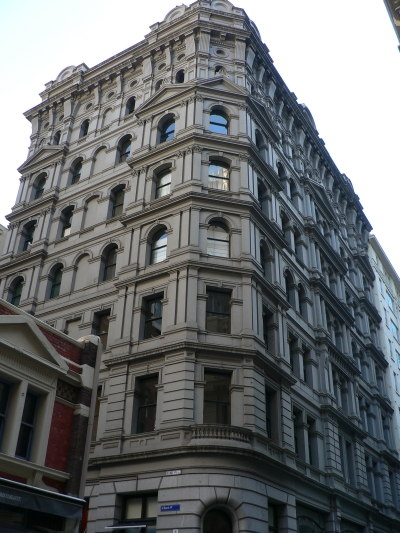
Stalbridge Chambers, Little Collins Street, Melbourne; completed 1891

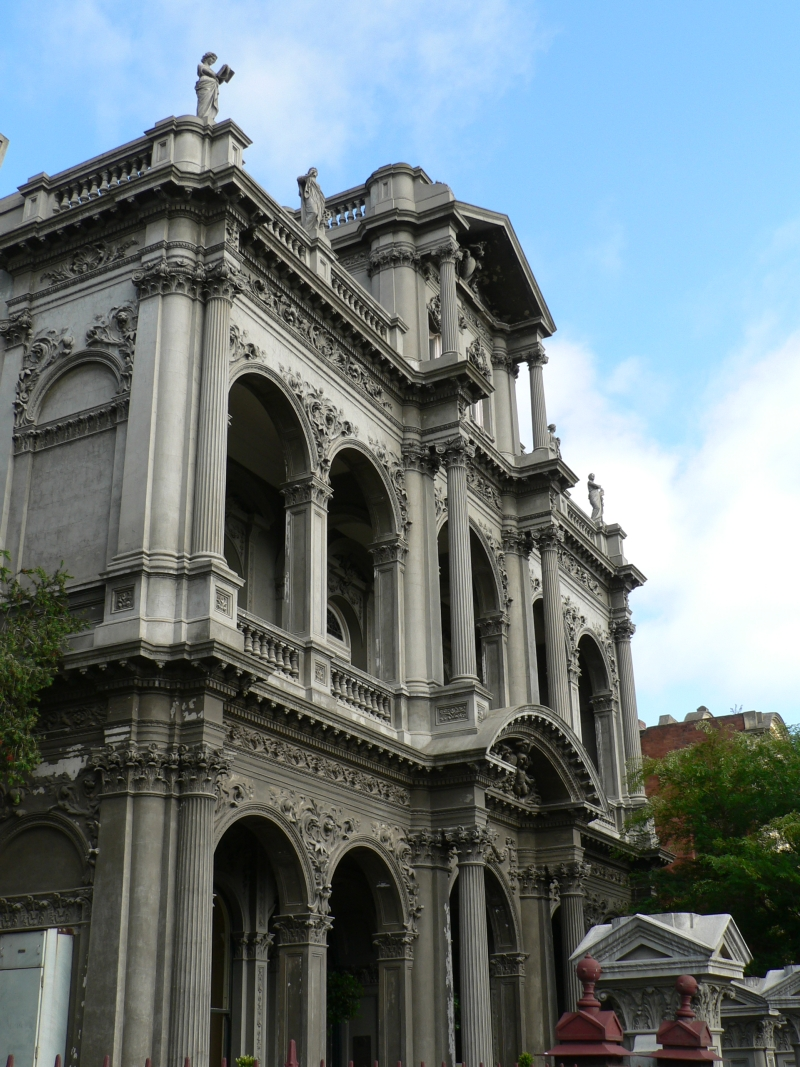
Benvenuta, Carlton, Victoria; completed 1893

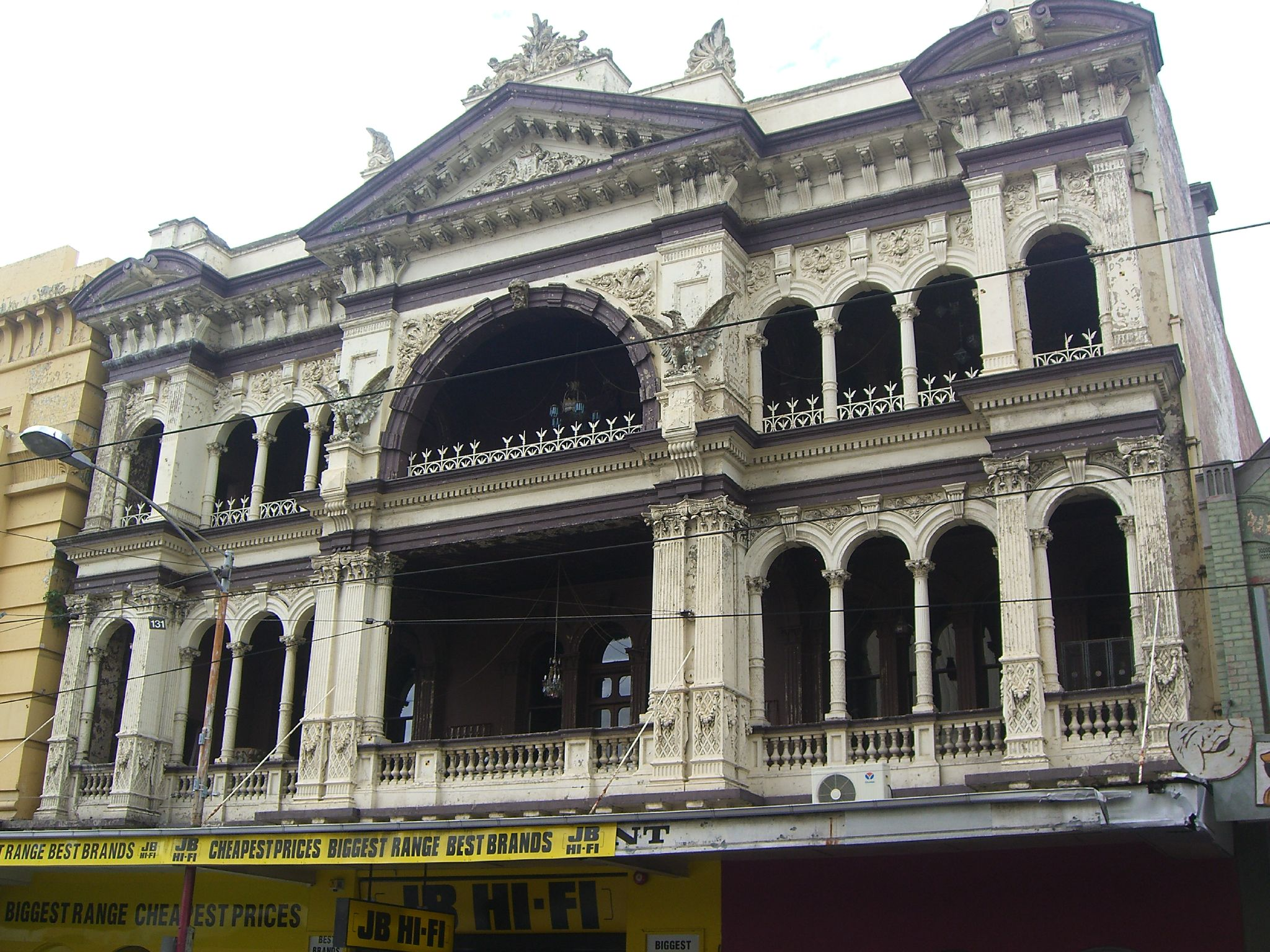
Prahran Arcade, Chapel Street, completed 1890

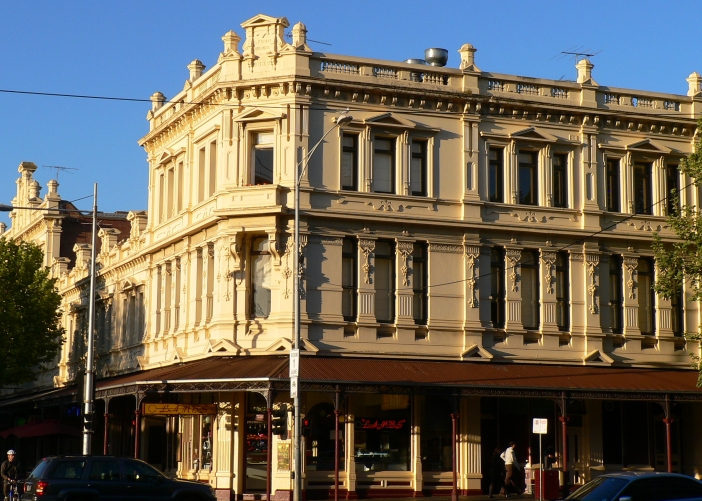
Lygon Buildings, Lygon Street, Melbourne; completed 1888

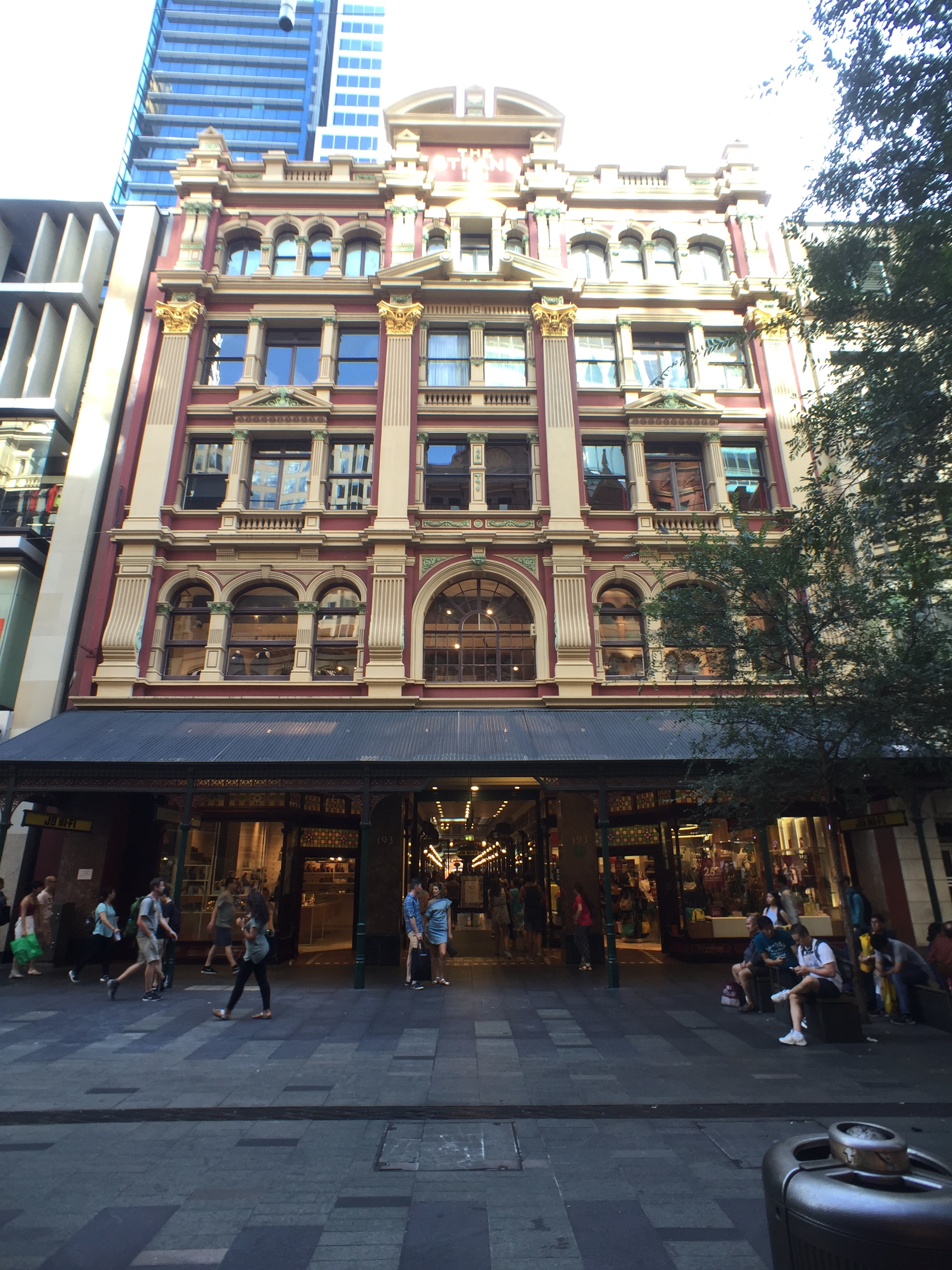
Strand Arcade, Sydney; Completed in 1892

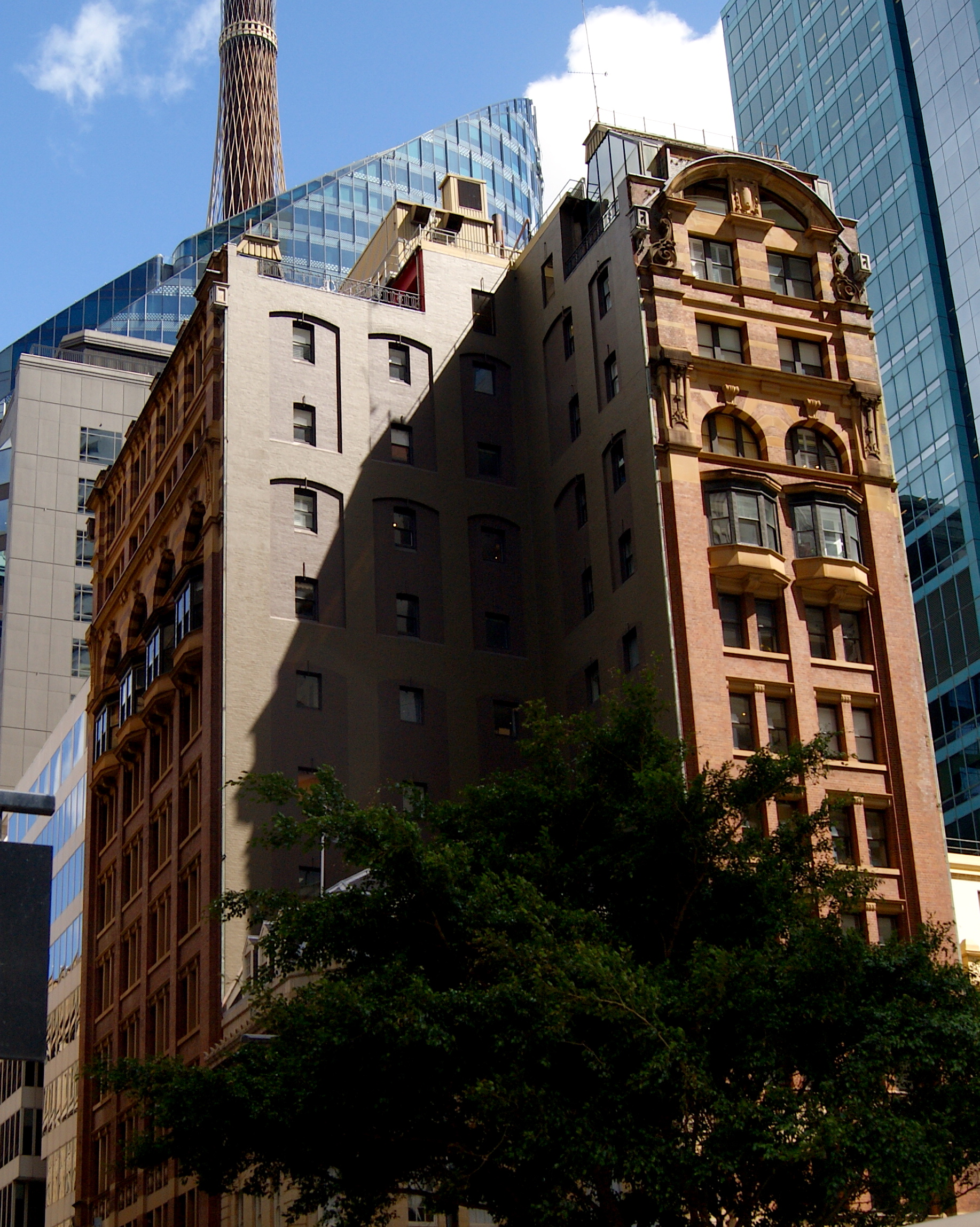
Culwulla Chambers, Sydney; completed in 1912

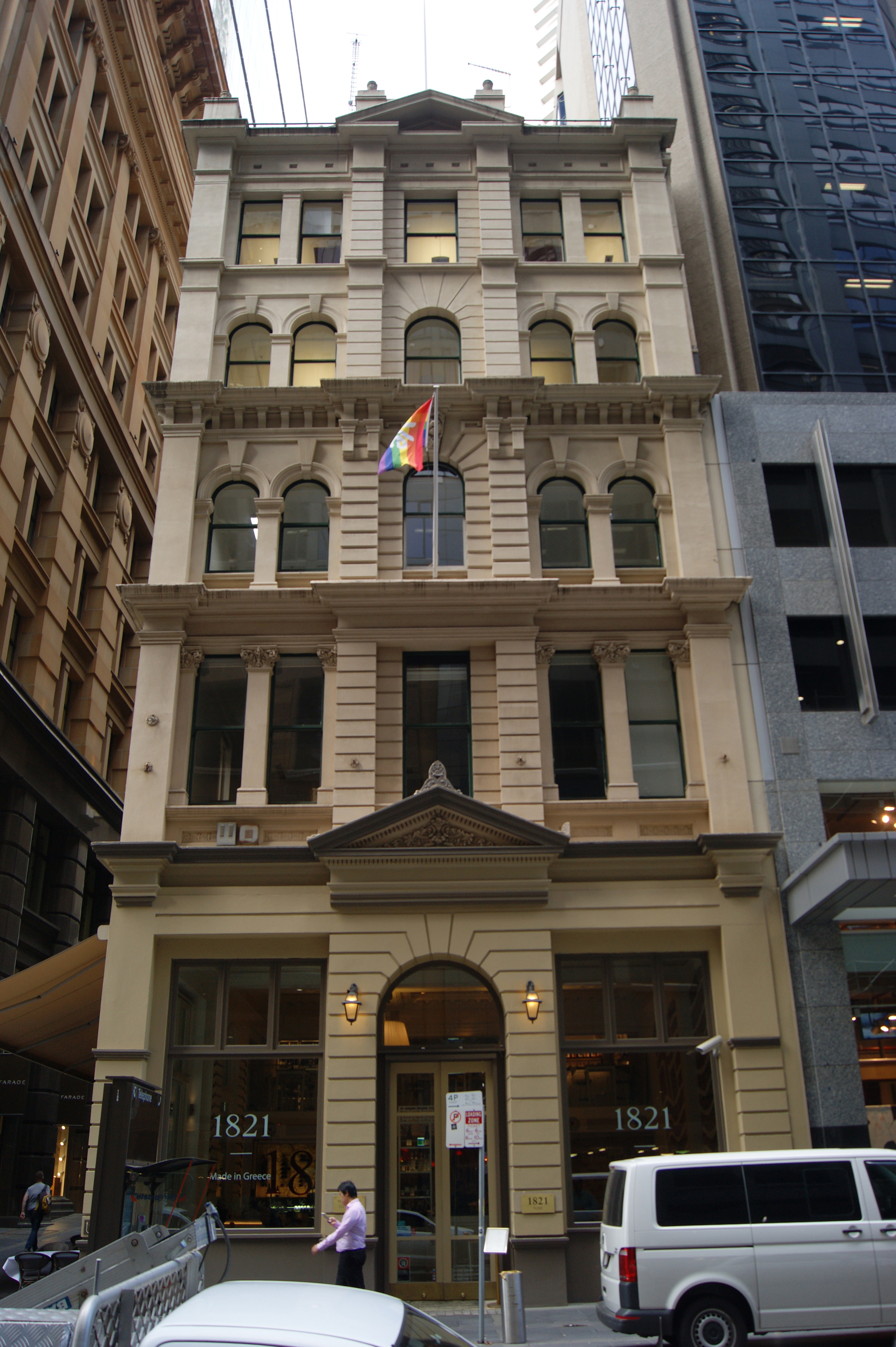
The Sydney Club, Sydney. Completed 1887

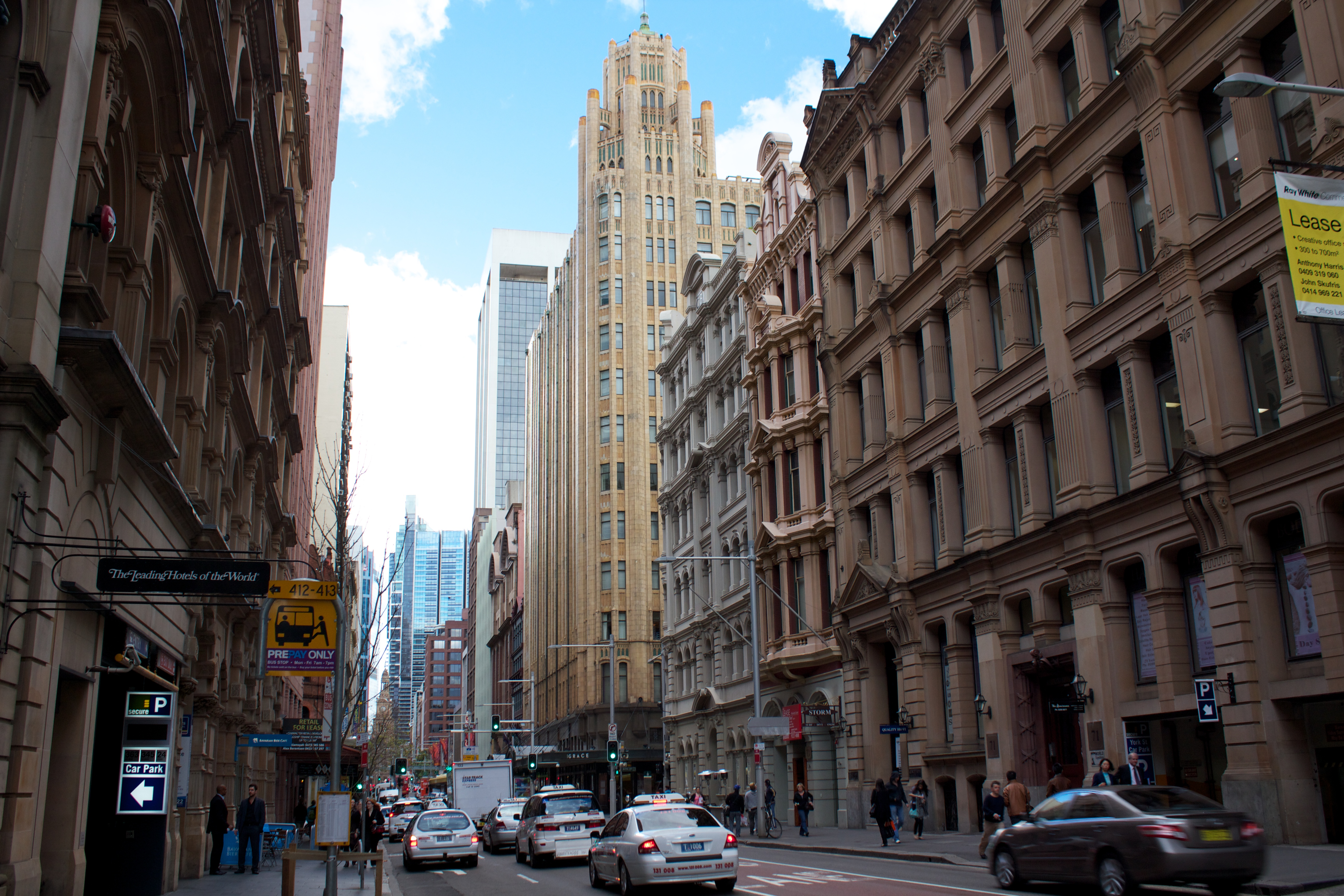
73 York Street, Sydney (right hand side). Completed 1890s

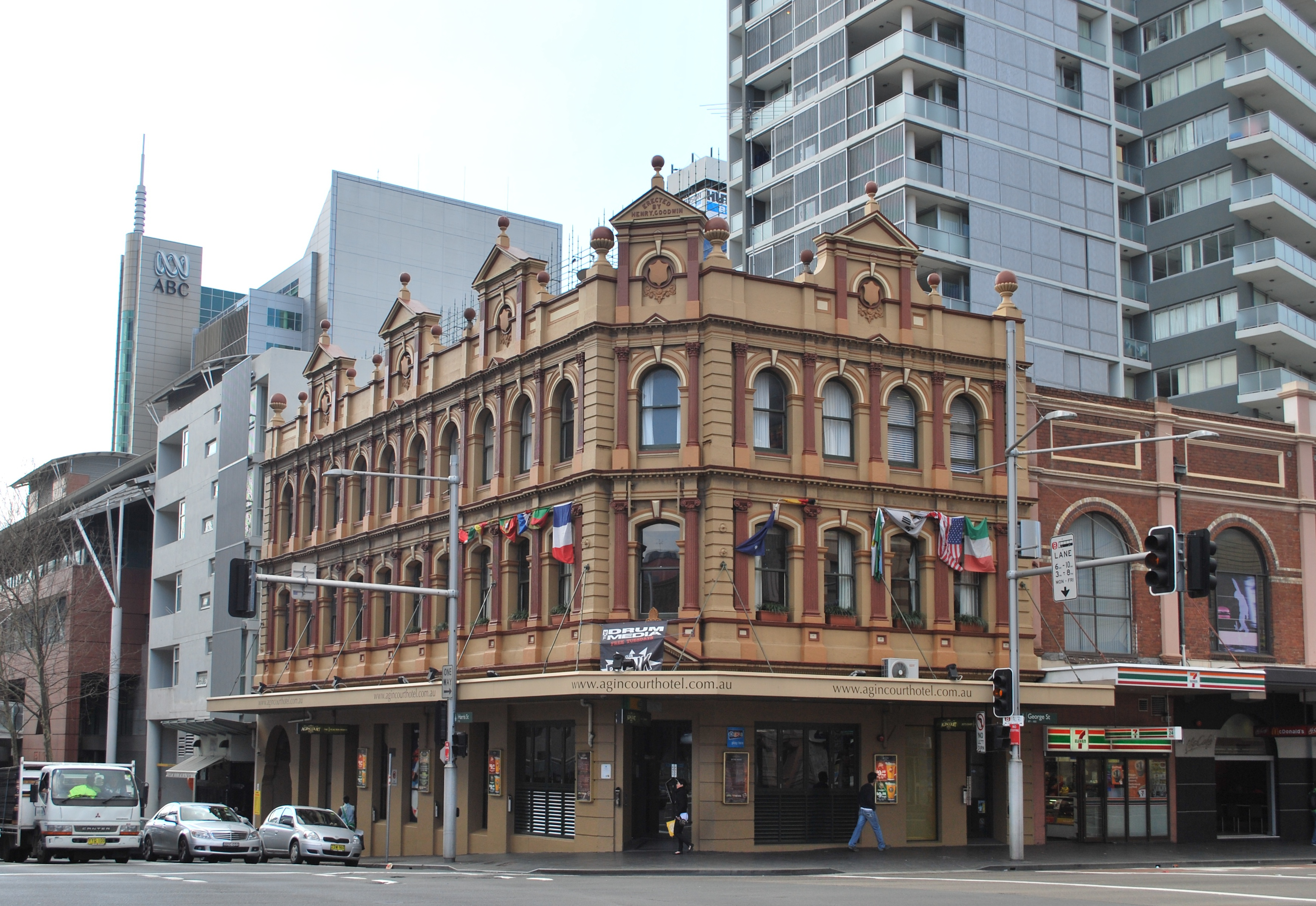
Agincourt Hotel; Chippendale. Completed 1898

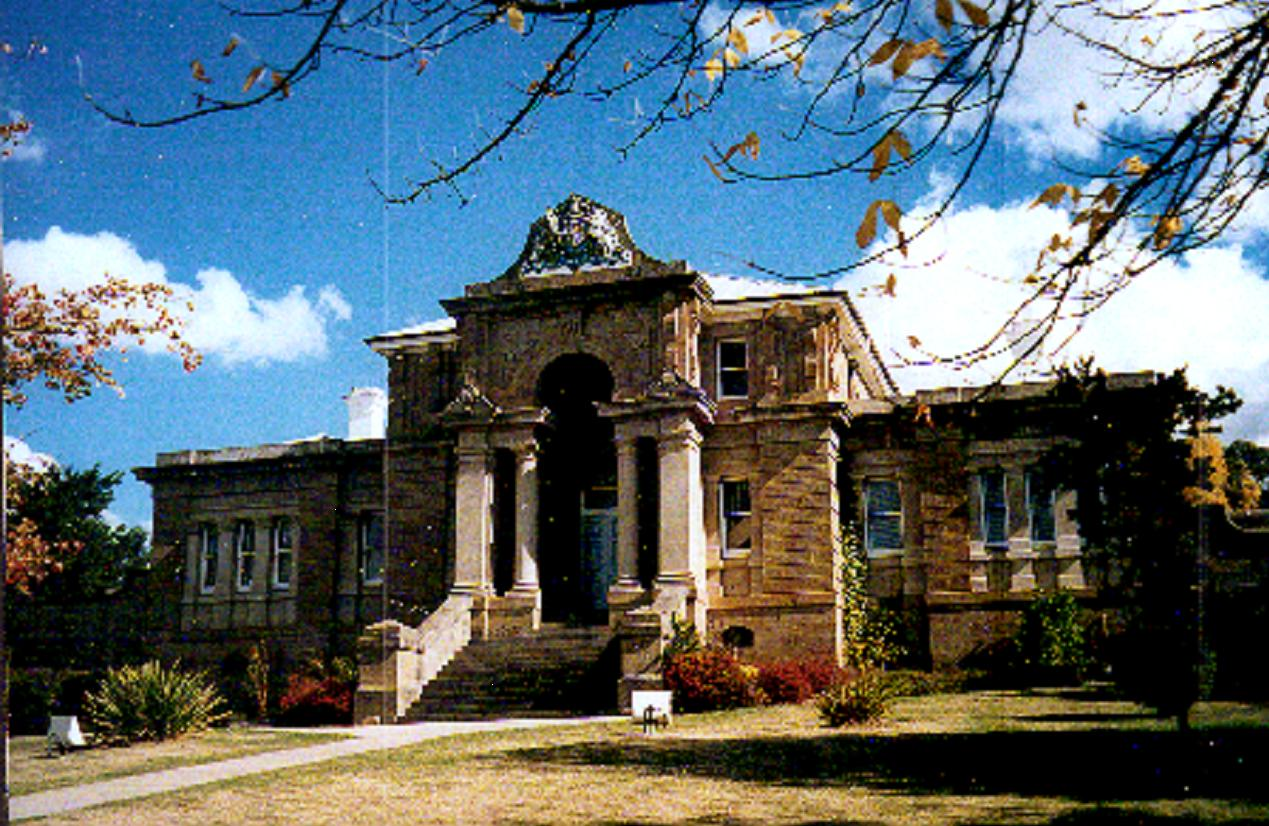
Cooma courthouse; Cooma

=== Victorian Second Empire ===
Notable examples include: Sydney Town Hall (Sydney); Hotel Windsor (Melbourne); Princess Theatre (Melbourne); Former Records Office (Melbourne); Melbourne General Post Office (Melbourne); Melbourne Town Hall (Melbourne); East Melbourne Synagogue (East Melbourne, Victoria); Royal Exhibition Building (Carlton, Victoria); Collingwood Town Hall (Collingwood, Victoria); South Melbourne Town Hall (South Melbourne, Victoria); Malvern Town Hall (Malvern, Victoria); Former Rechabite Hall (Prahran, Victoria); Brunswick Town Hall (Brunswick, Victoria); Camberwell Town Hall (Camberwell, Victoria); Bendigo Town Hall (Bendigo, Victoria); Shamrock Hotel (Bendigo Victoria); Bendigo Courthouse (Bendigo, Victoria); Bendigo Post Office (Bendigo, Victoria); Institute of Technology (Bendigo, Victoria); Queensland Parliament House (Brisbane)

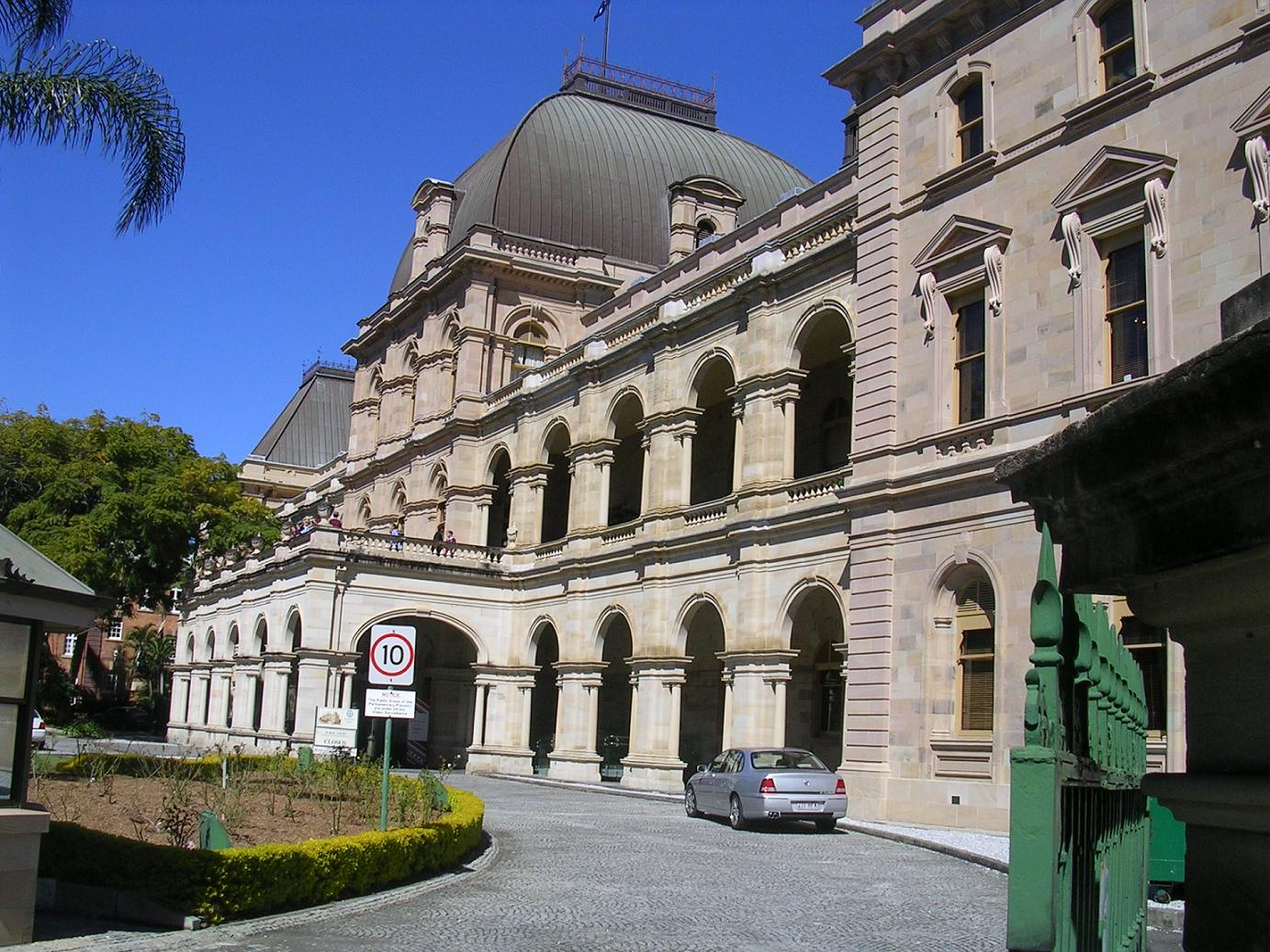
Parliament House, Brisbane; completed 1868

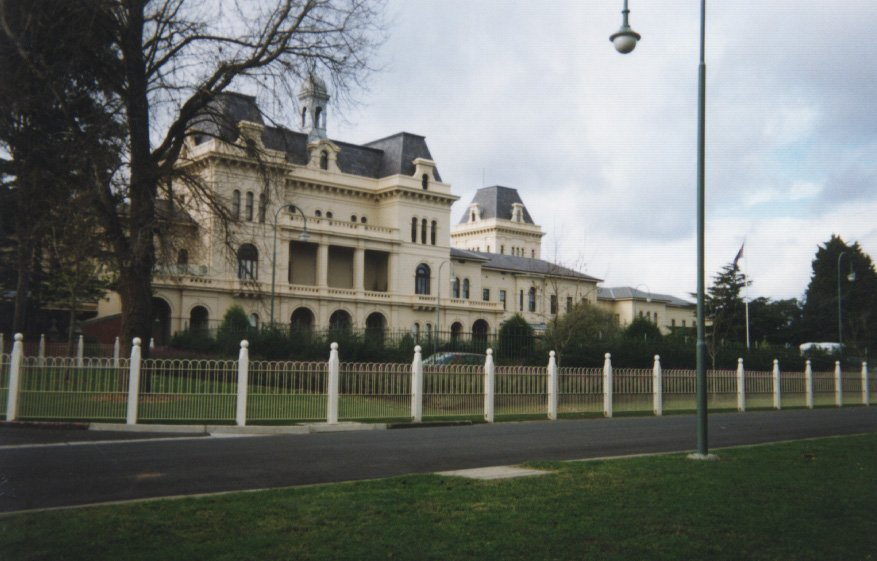
Kew Asylum, Kew; completed 1871

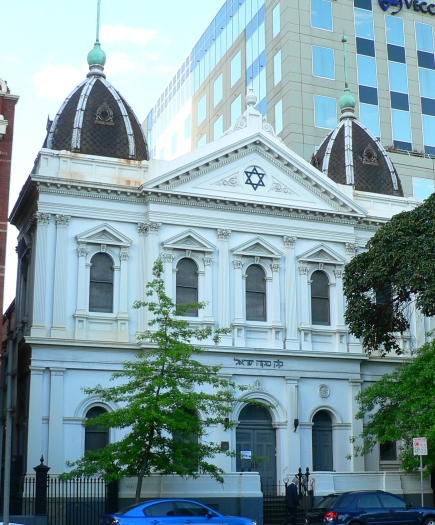
East Melbourne Synagogue. East Melbourne; completed 1877

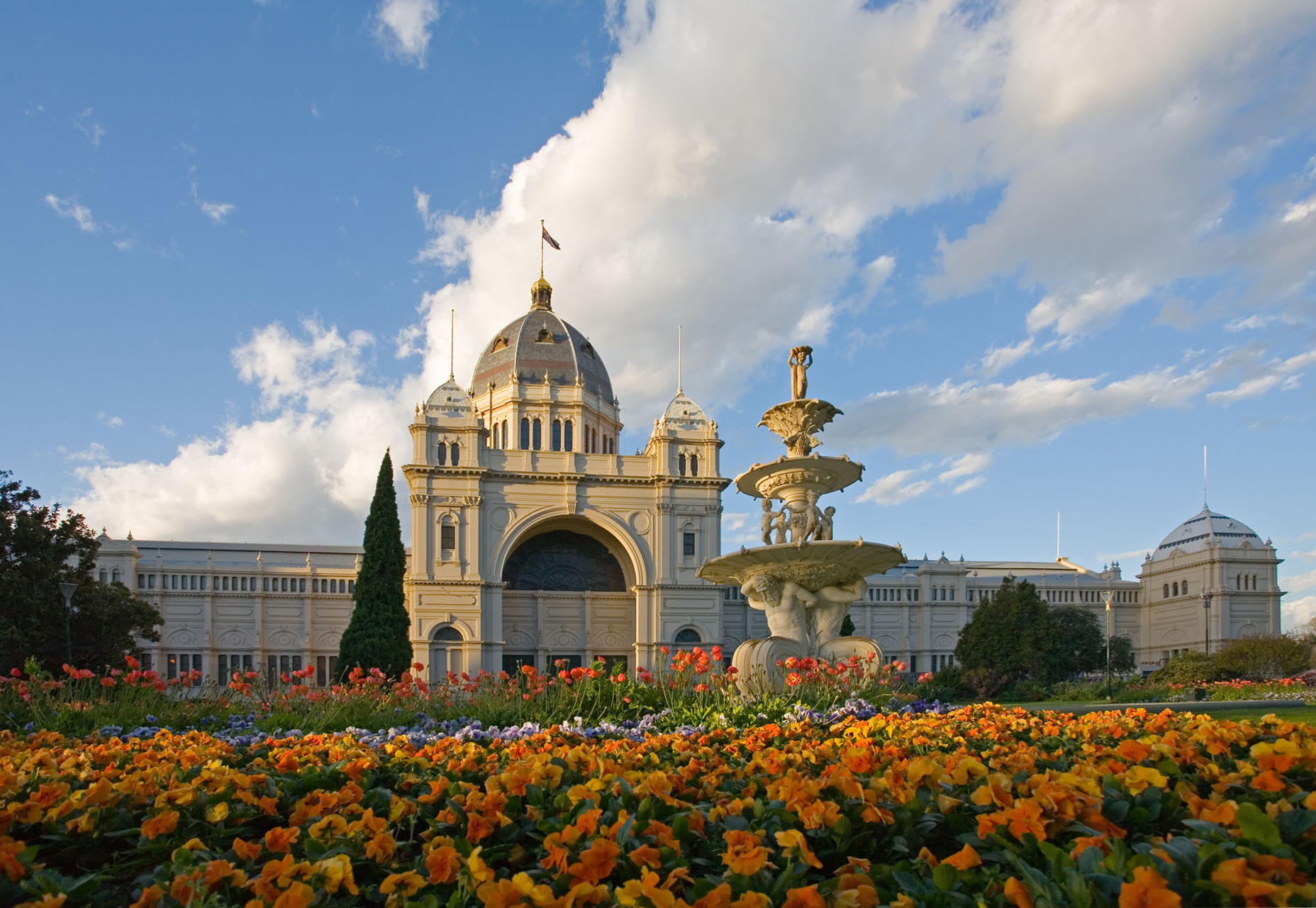
Royal Exhibition Building, Melbourne; completed 1880

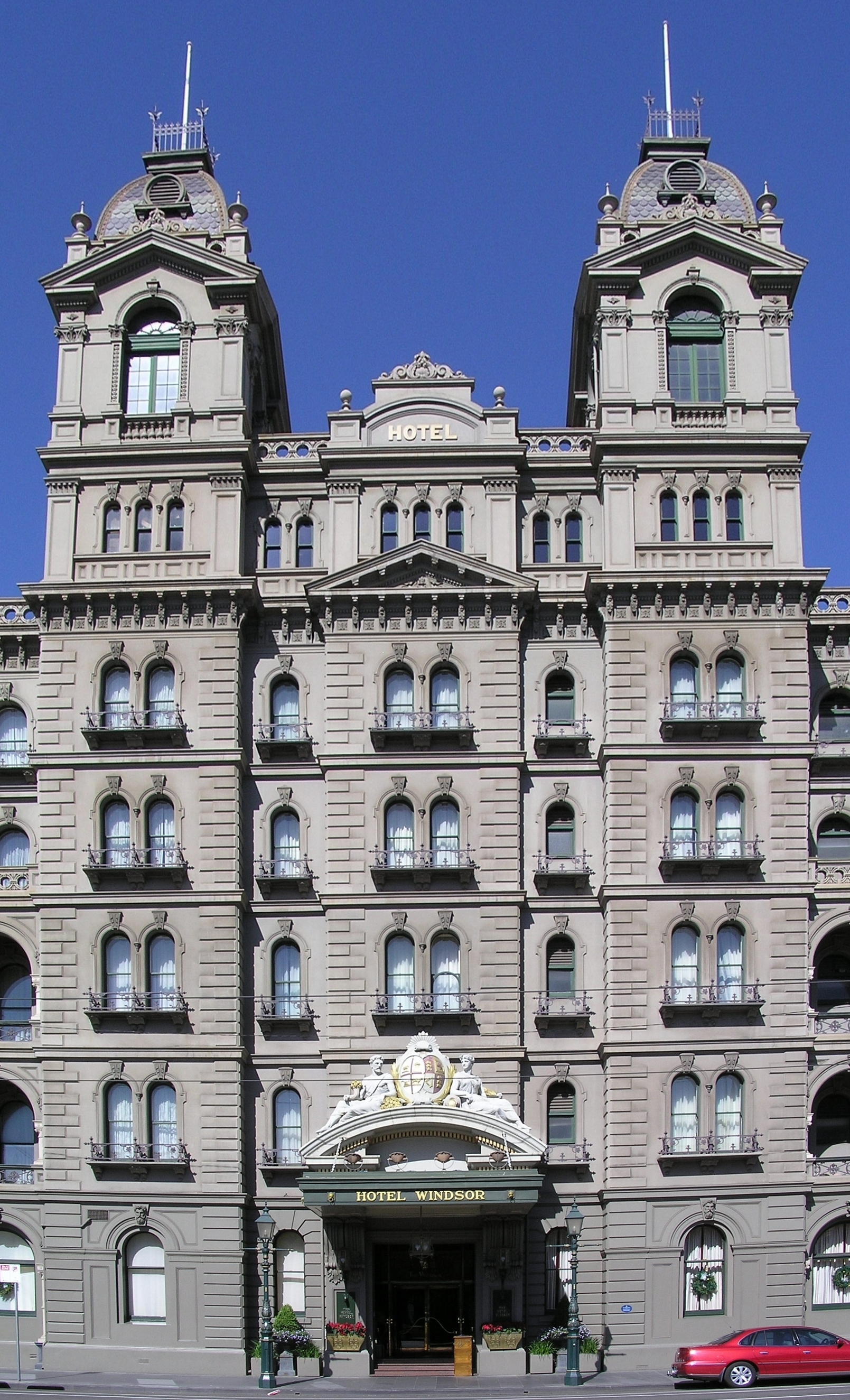
Hotel Windsor, Melbourne; completed 1883

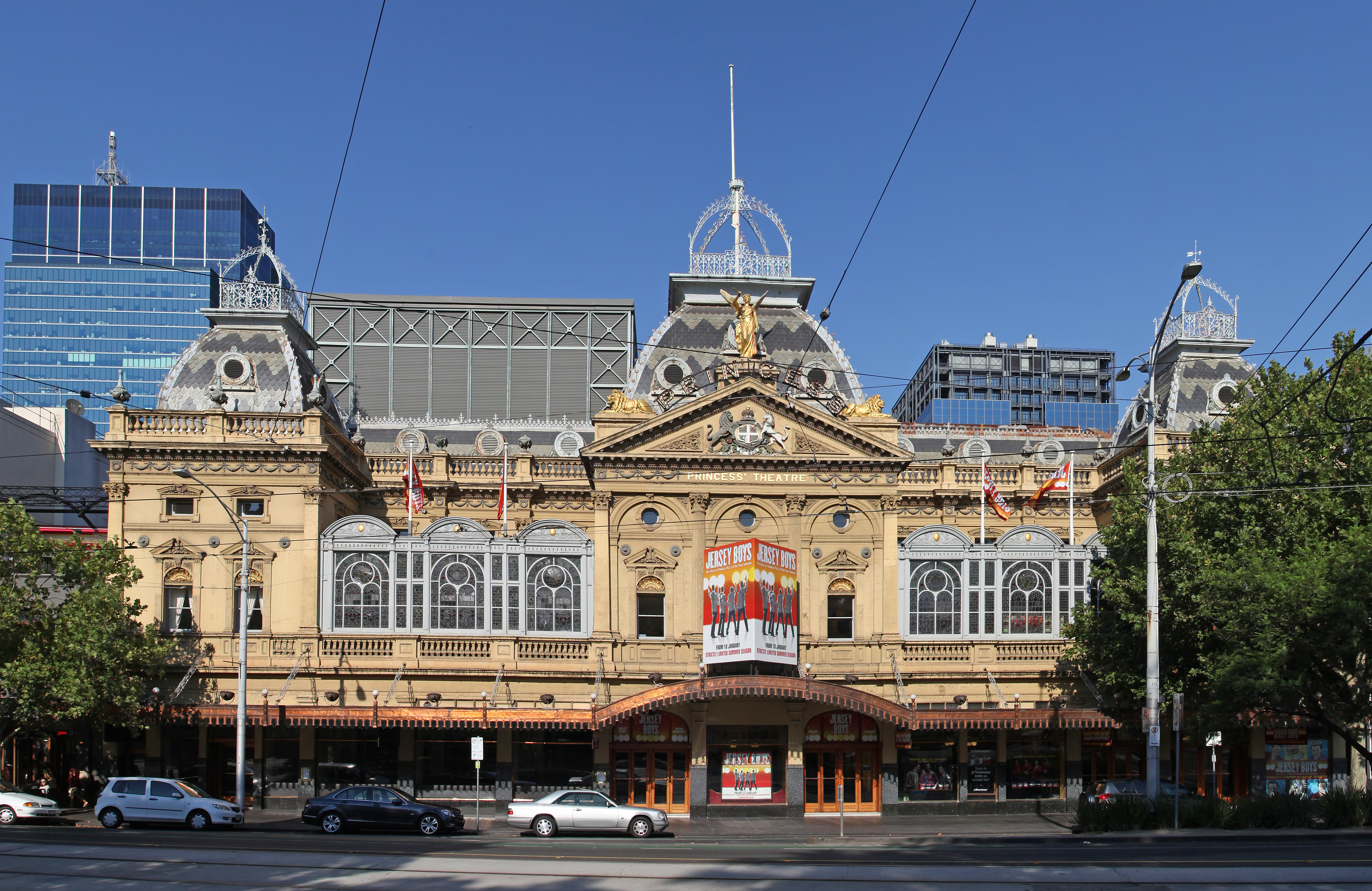
Princess Theatre, Melbourne; completed 1886

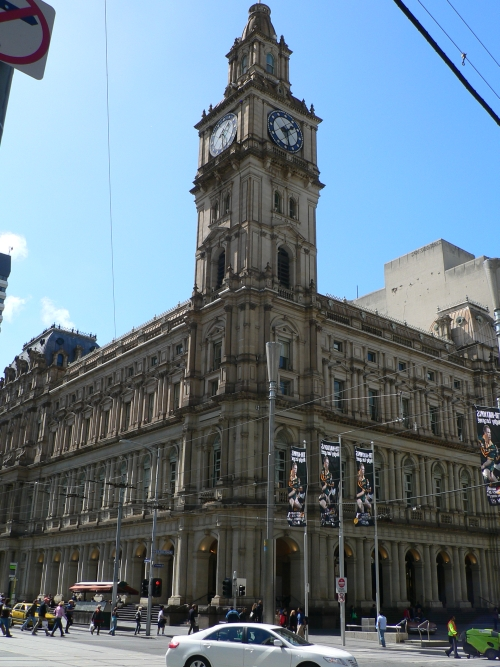
General Post Office; completed 1887

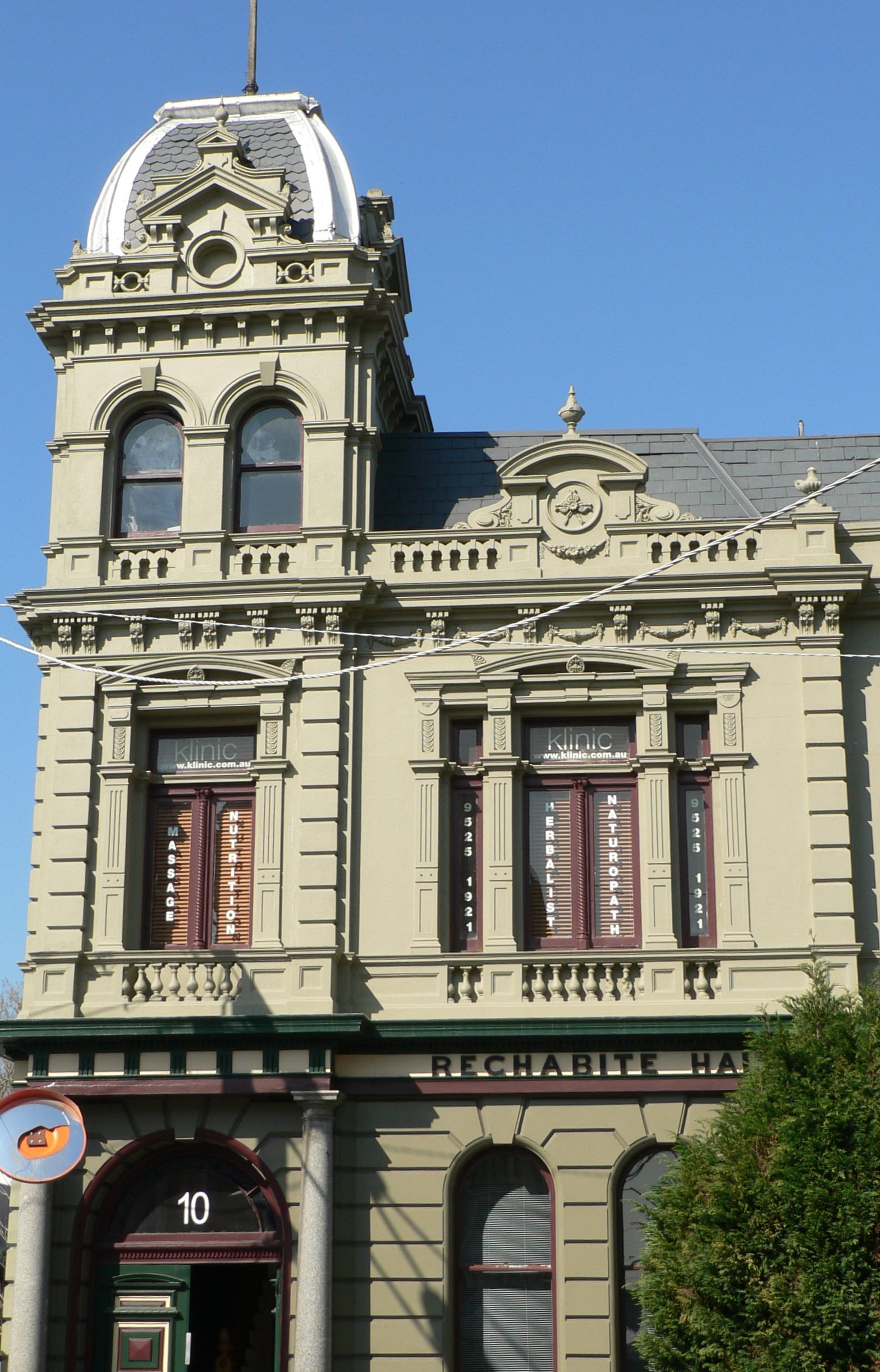
Former Rechabite Hall, Prahran completed 1888

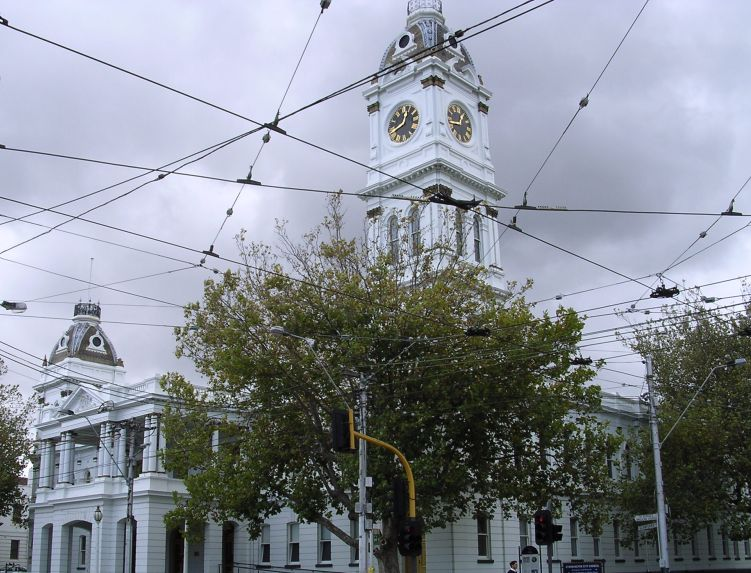
Malvern Town Hall, Malvern; completed 1890

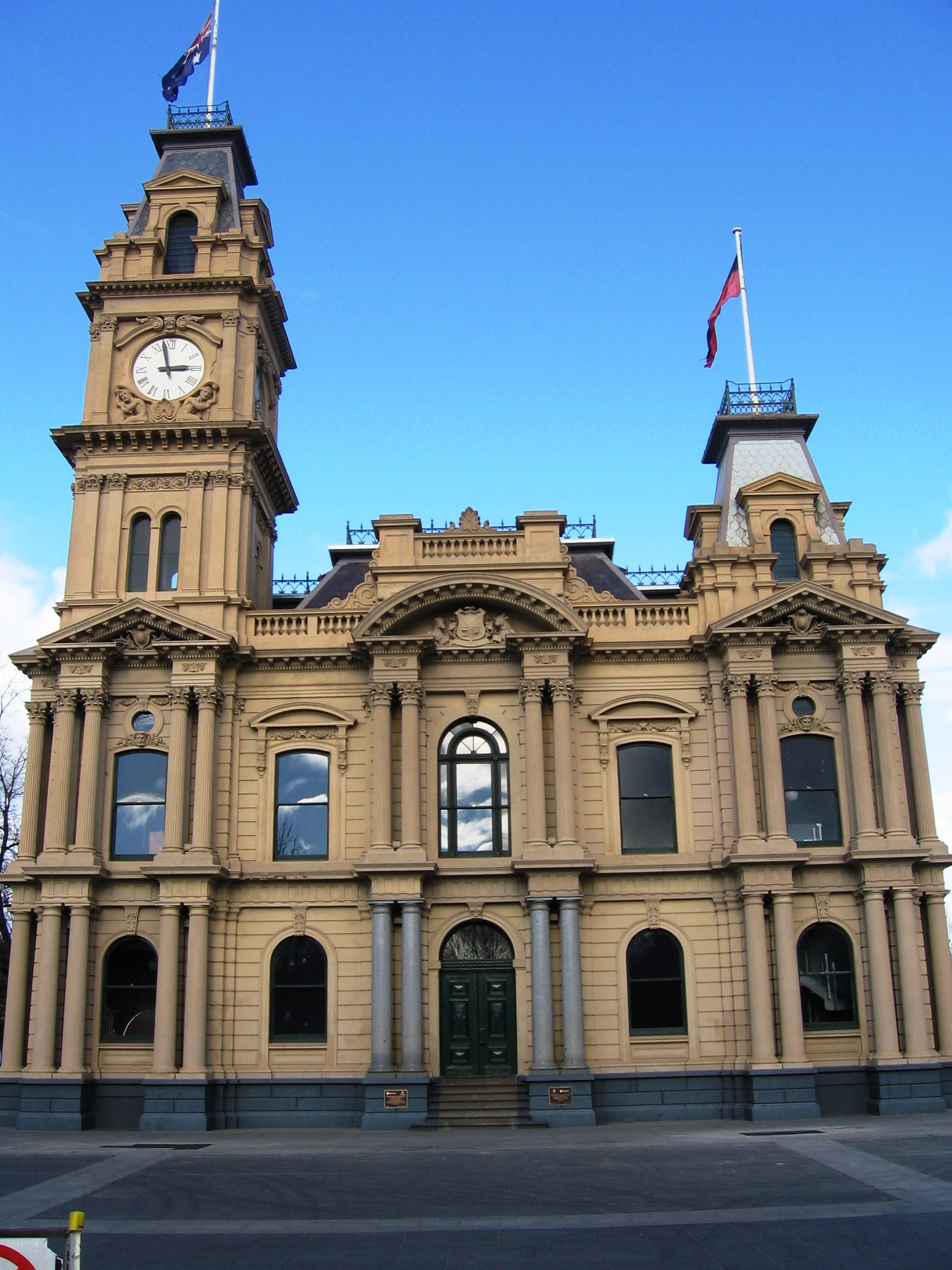
Bendigo Town Hall, Bendigo; completed 1885

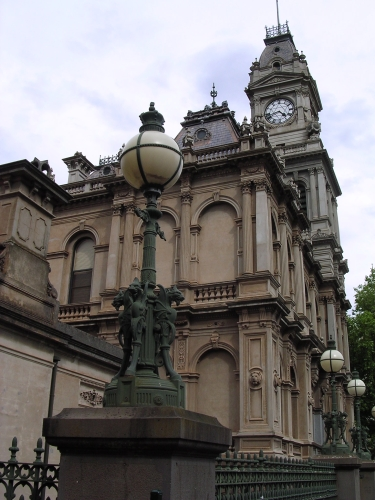
Bendigo Post Office, Bendigo; completed 1892

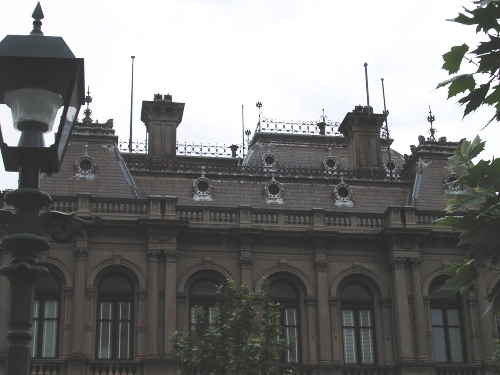
Bendigo Court House, Bendigo; completed 1892

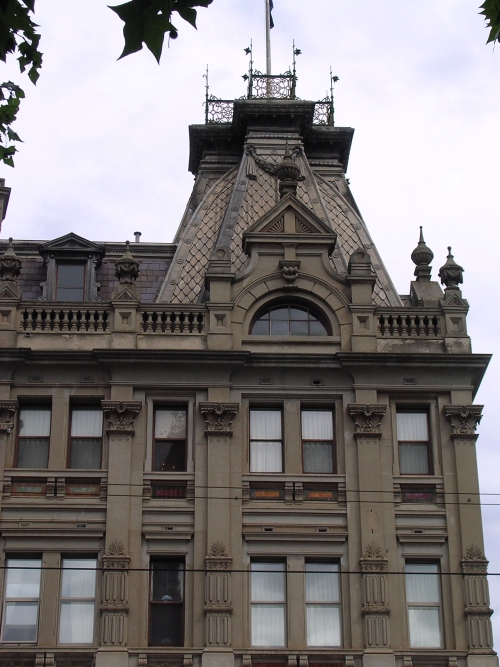
Shamrock Hotel, Bendigo; completed 1897

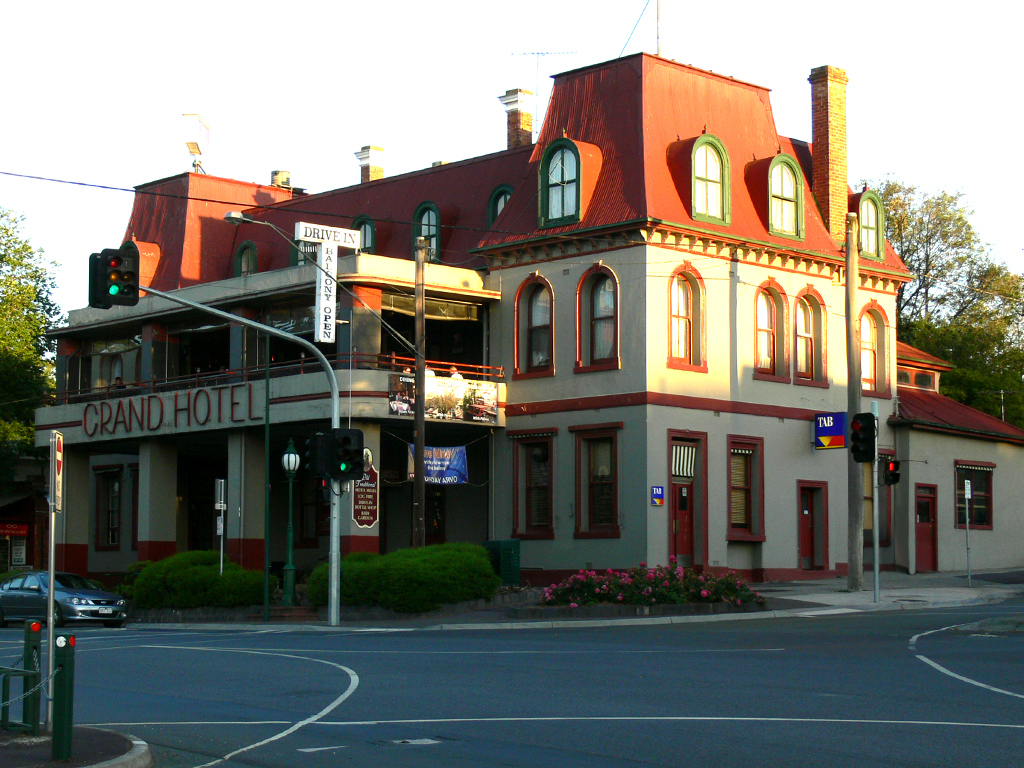
Grand Hotel, Healesville

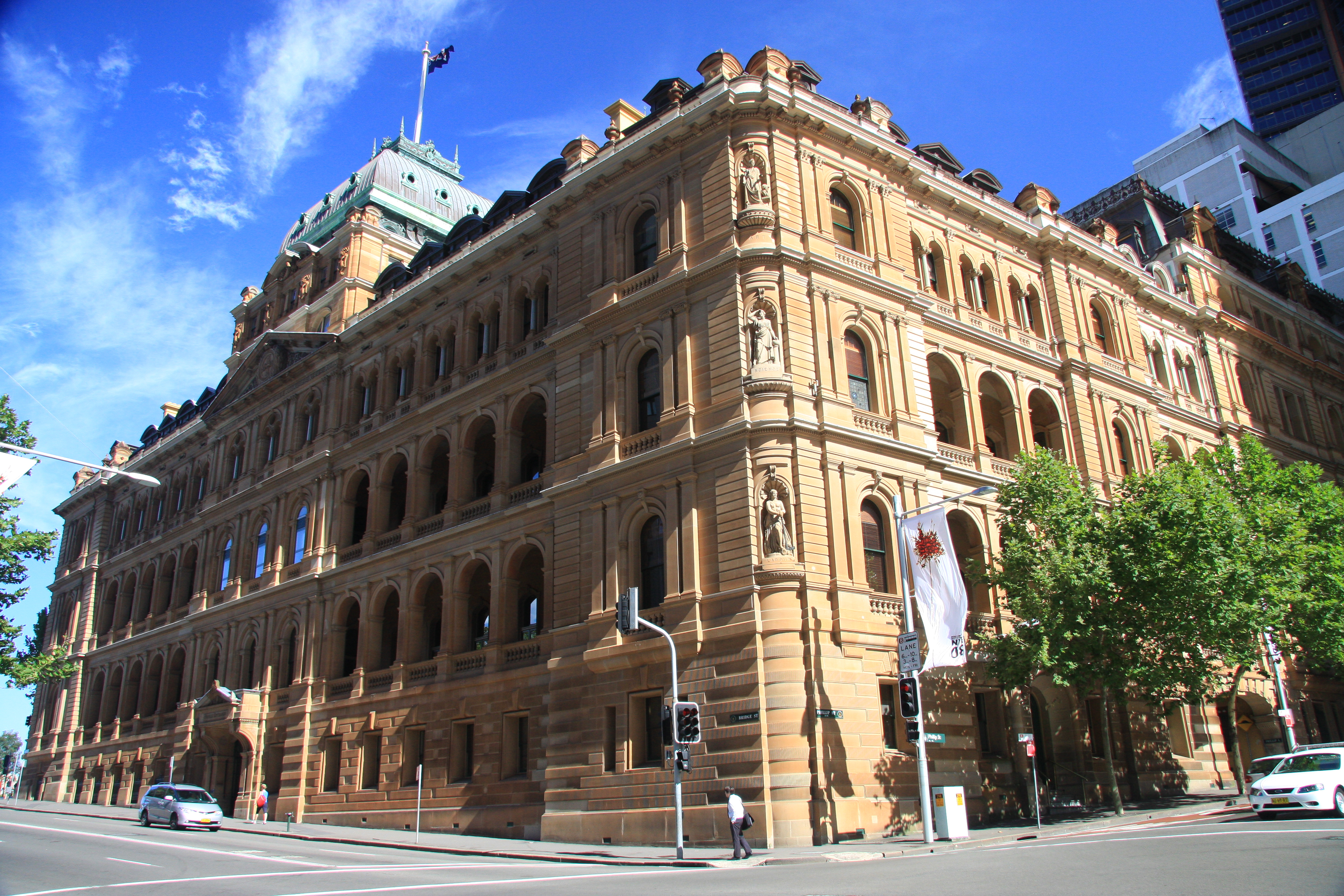
Chief Secretary's Building, Sydney. Completed 1886. Also displays Victorian Free Classical architectural traits

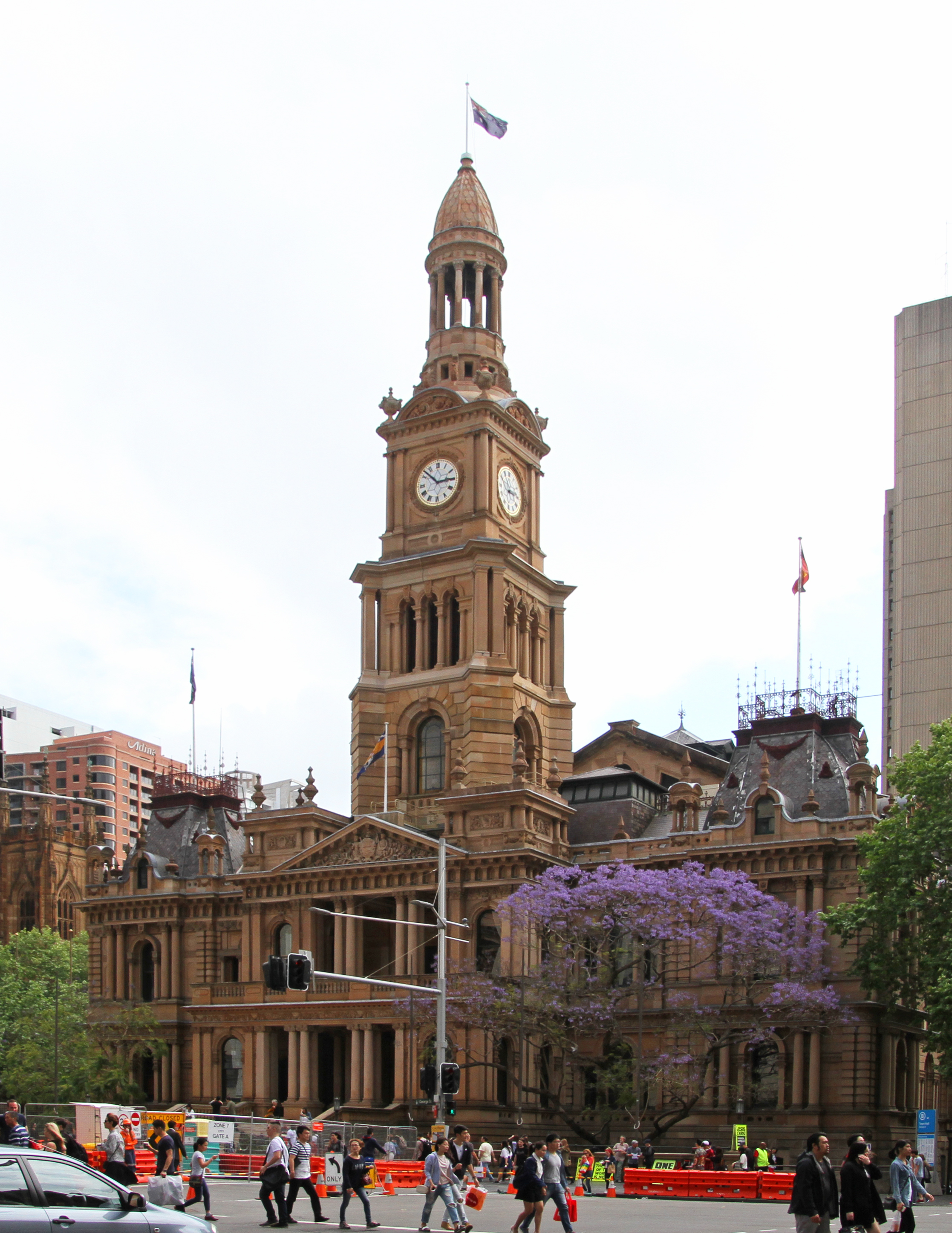
Sydney Town Hall. Completed 1889

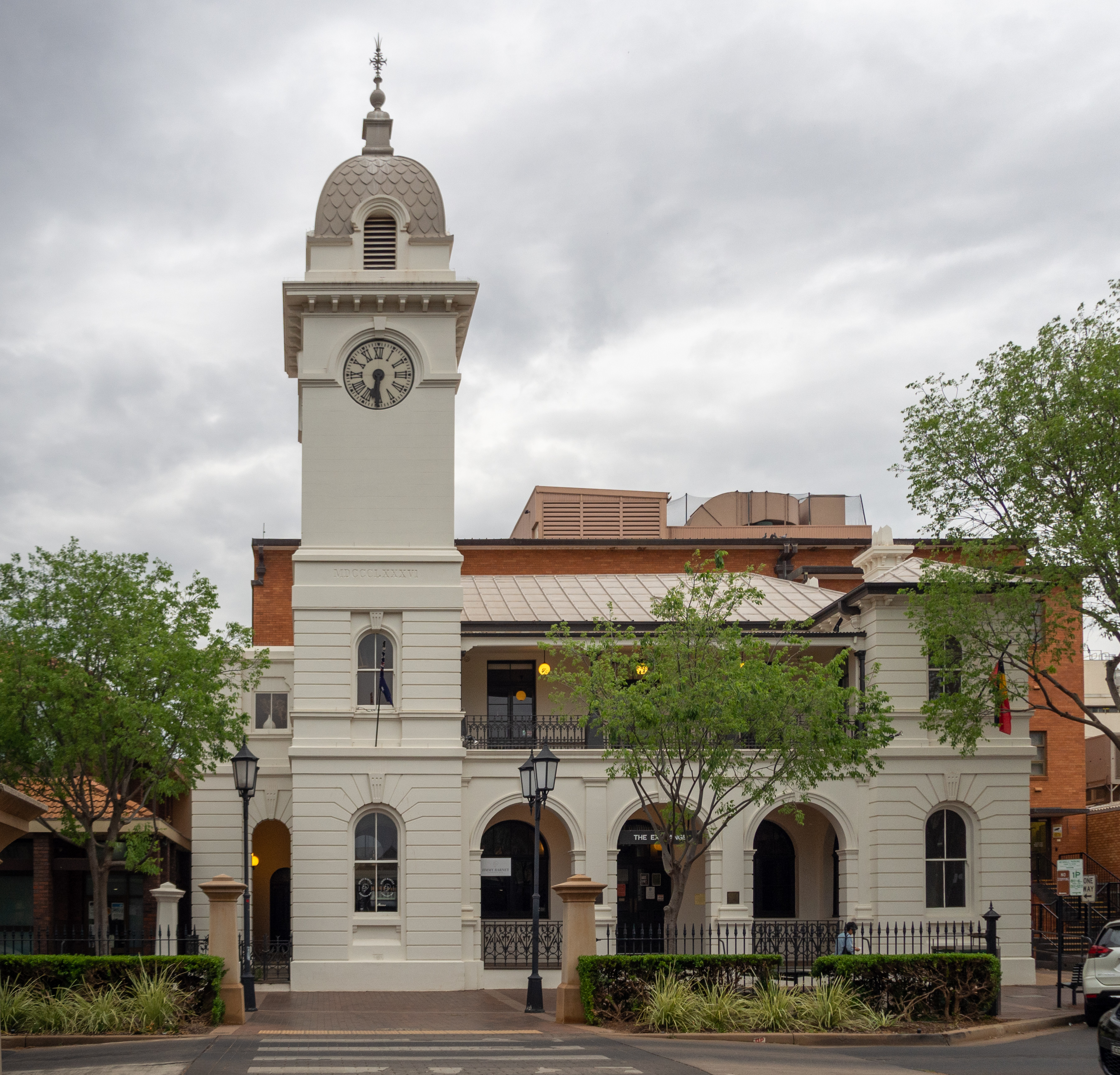
Dubbo Post Office, Dubbo

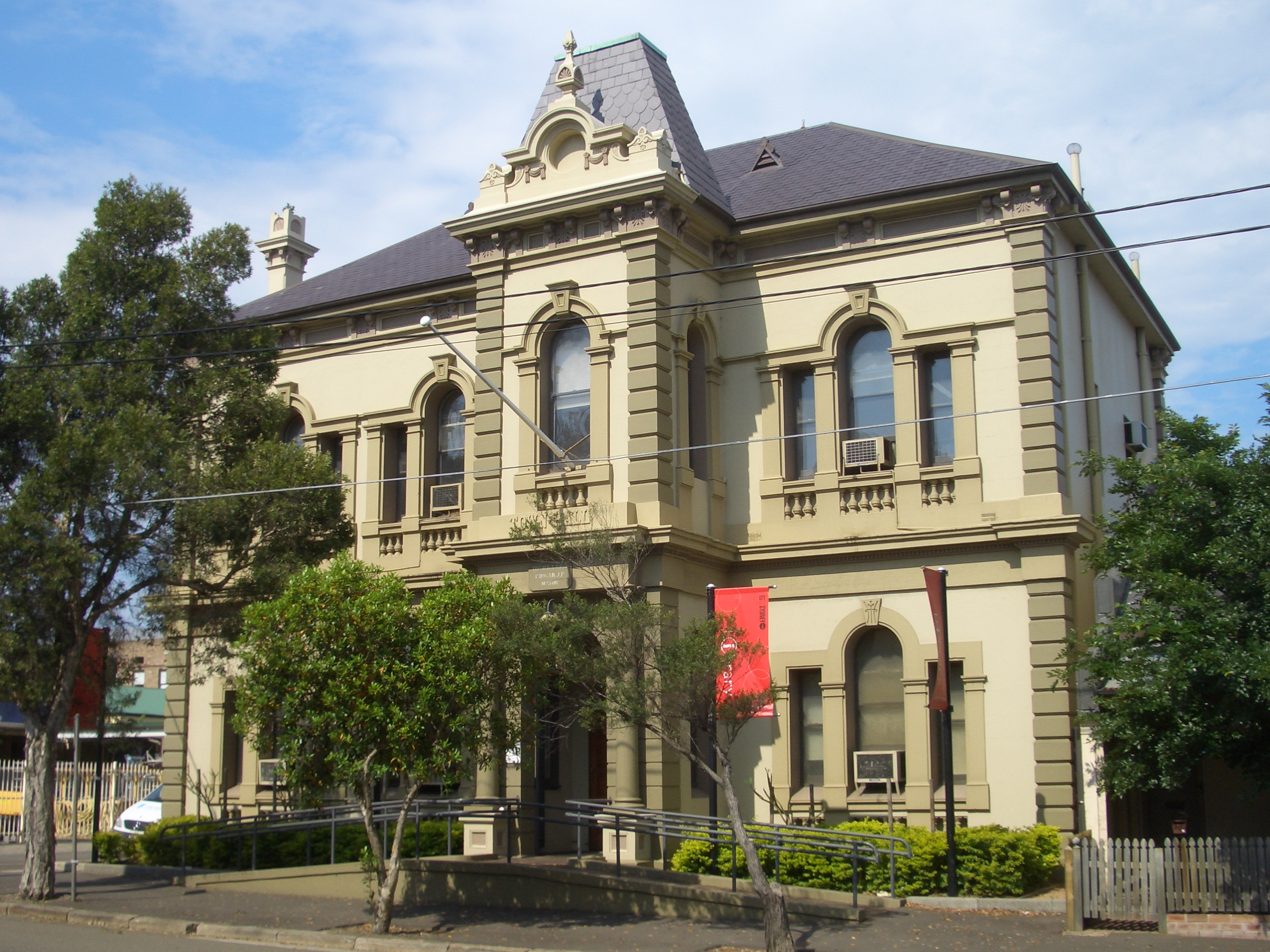
Waterloo Town Hall, Waterloo, New South Wales, with Victorian Italianate and Victorian Second Empire architectural elements. Completed 1881

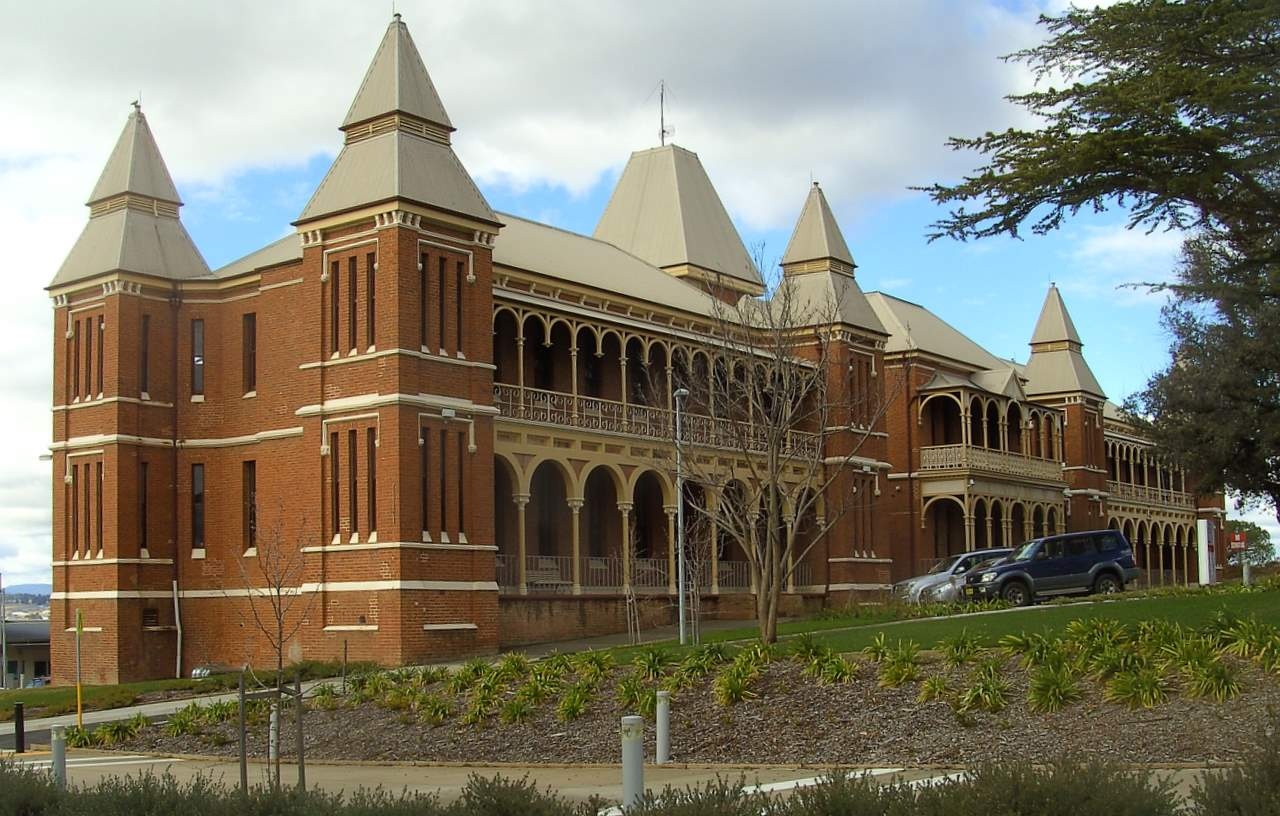
Bathurst District Hospital, Bathurst. Completed 1886

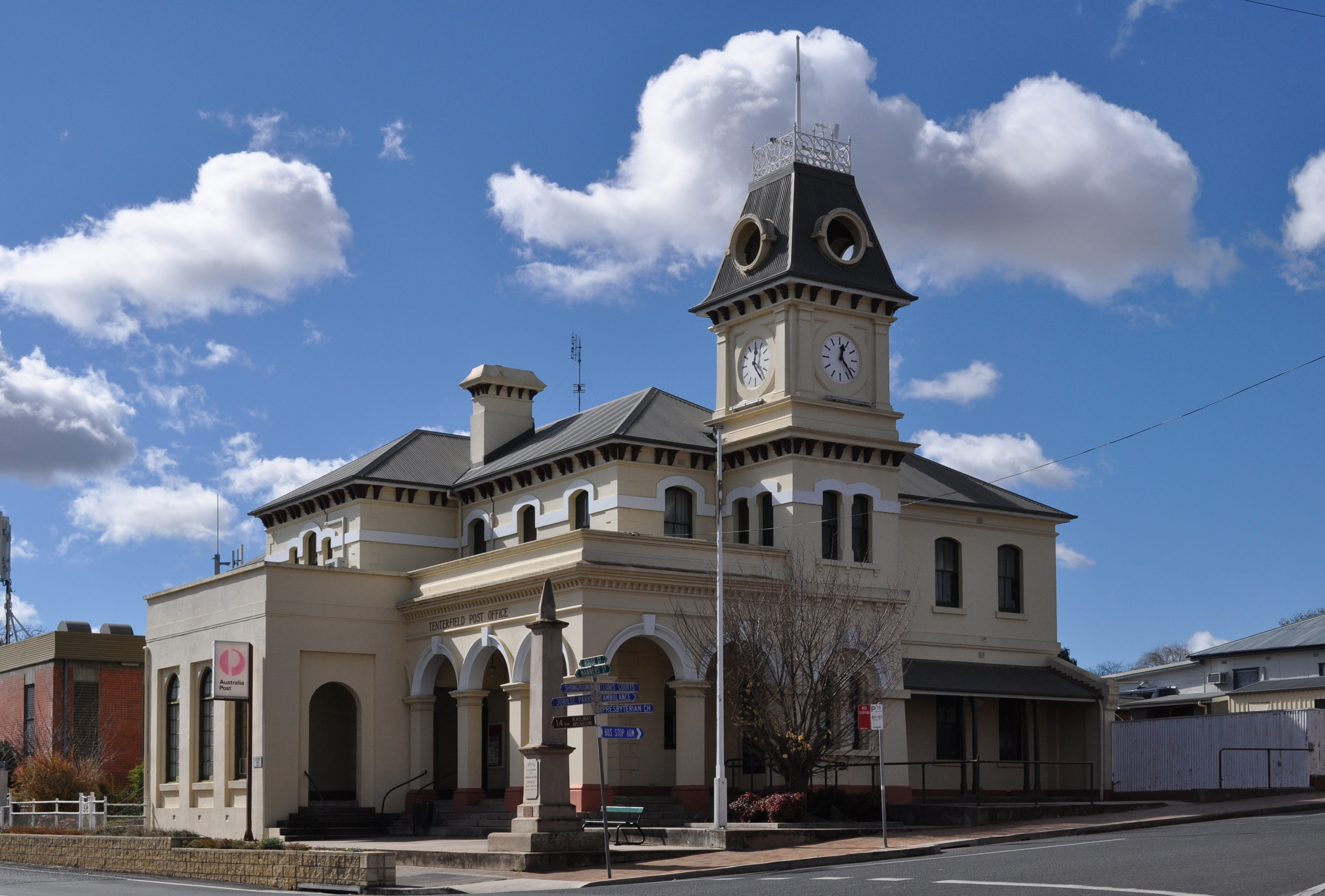
Tenterfield Post Office, Tenterfield with Victorian Second Empire and Victorian Italianate architectural elements. Completed 1880s

=== Victorian Italianate ===
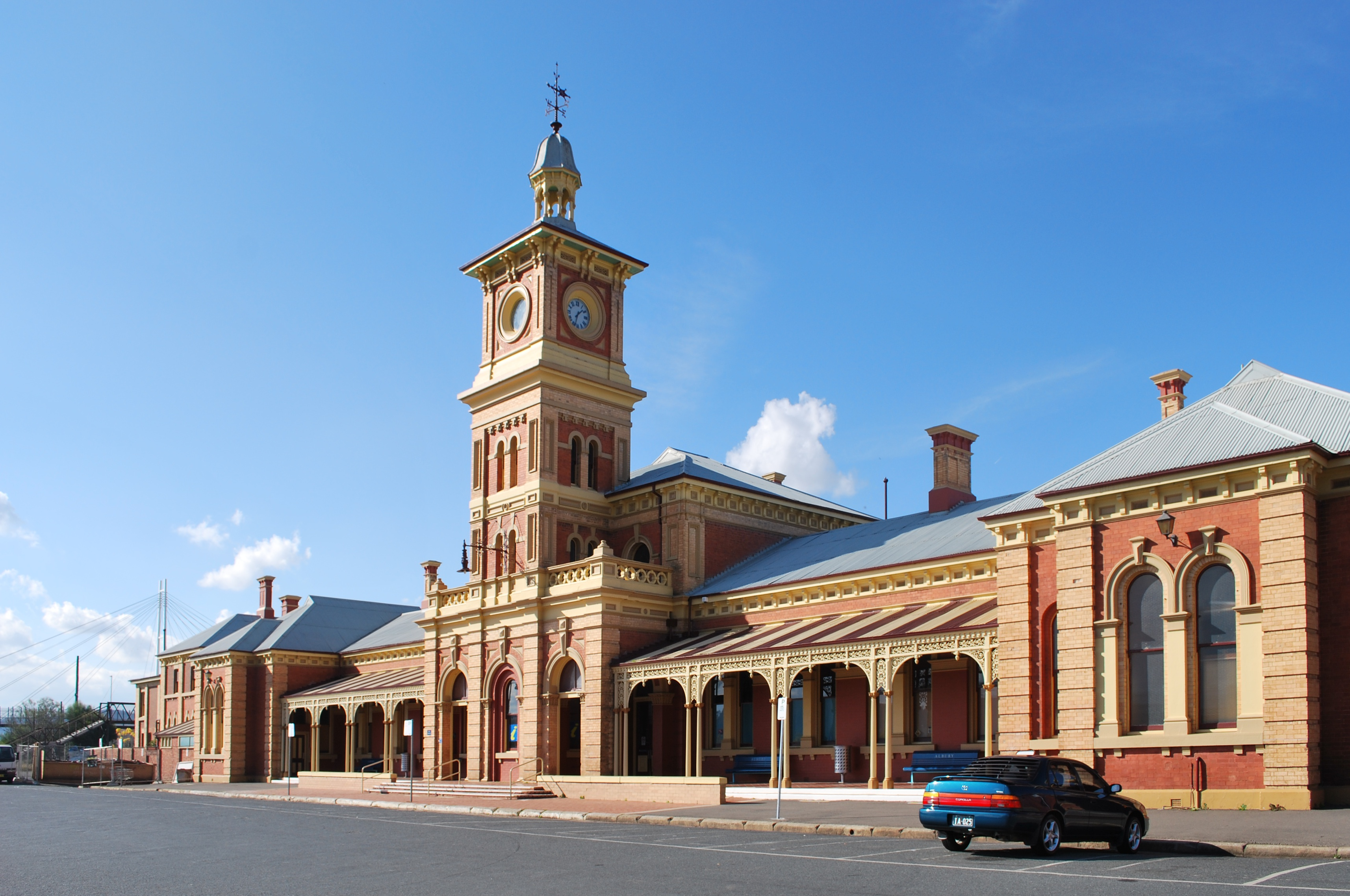
Albury railway station, Albury; built 1881

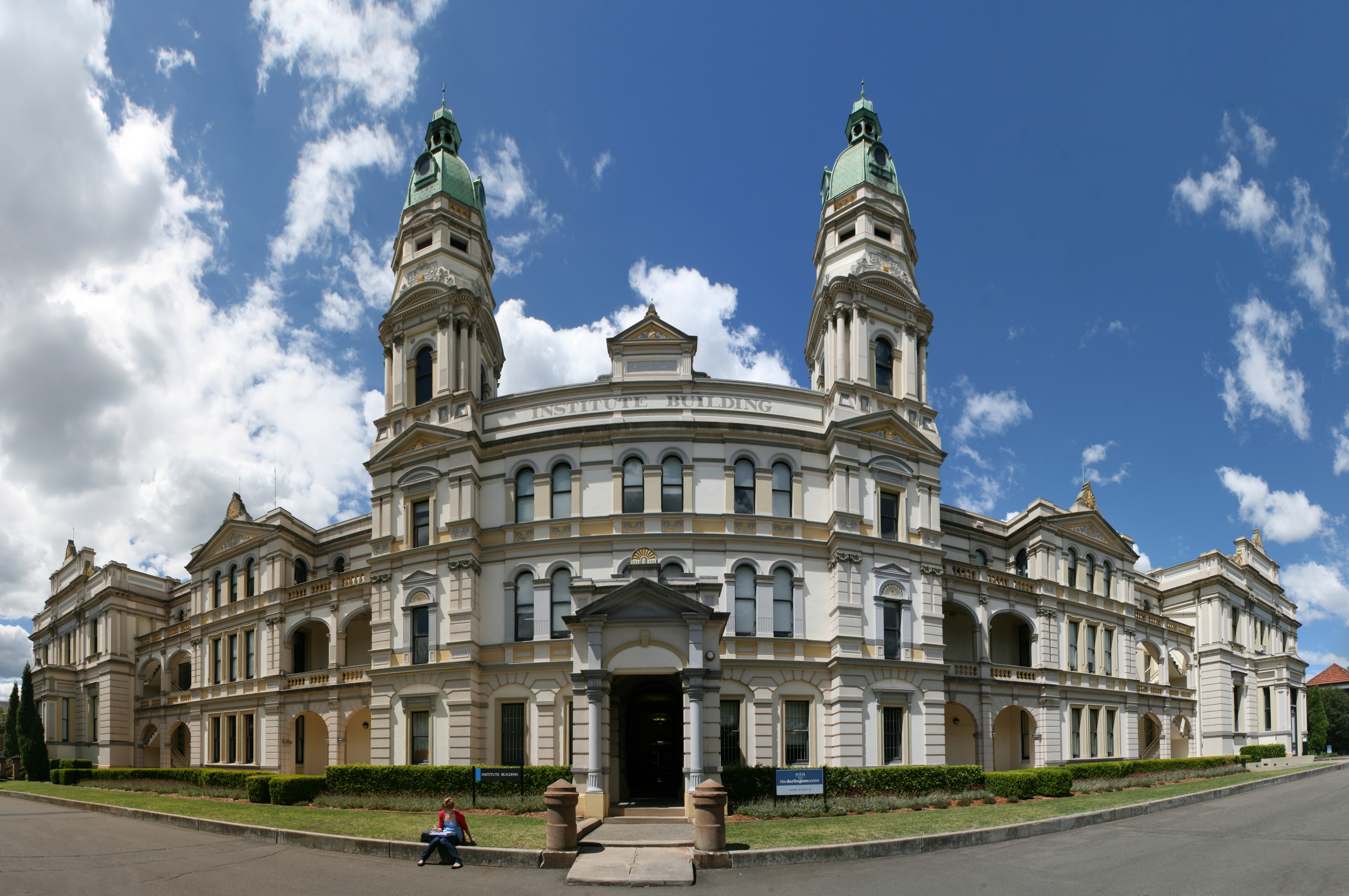
Institute Building, Darlington

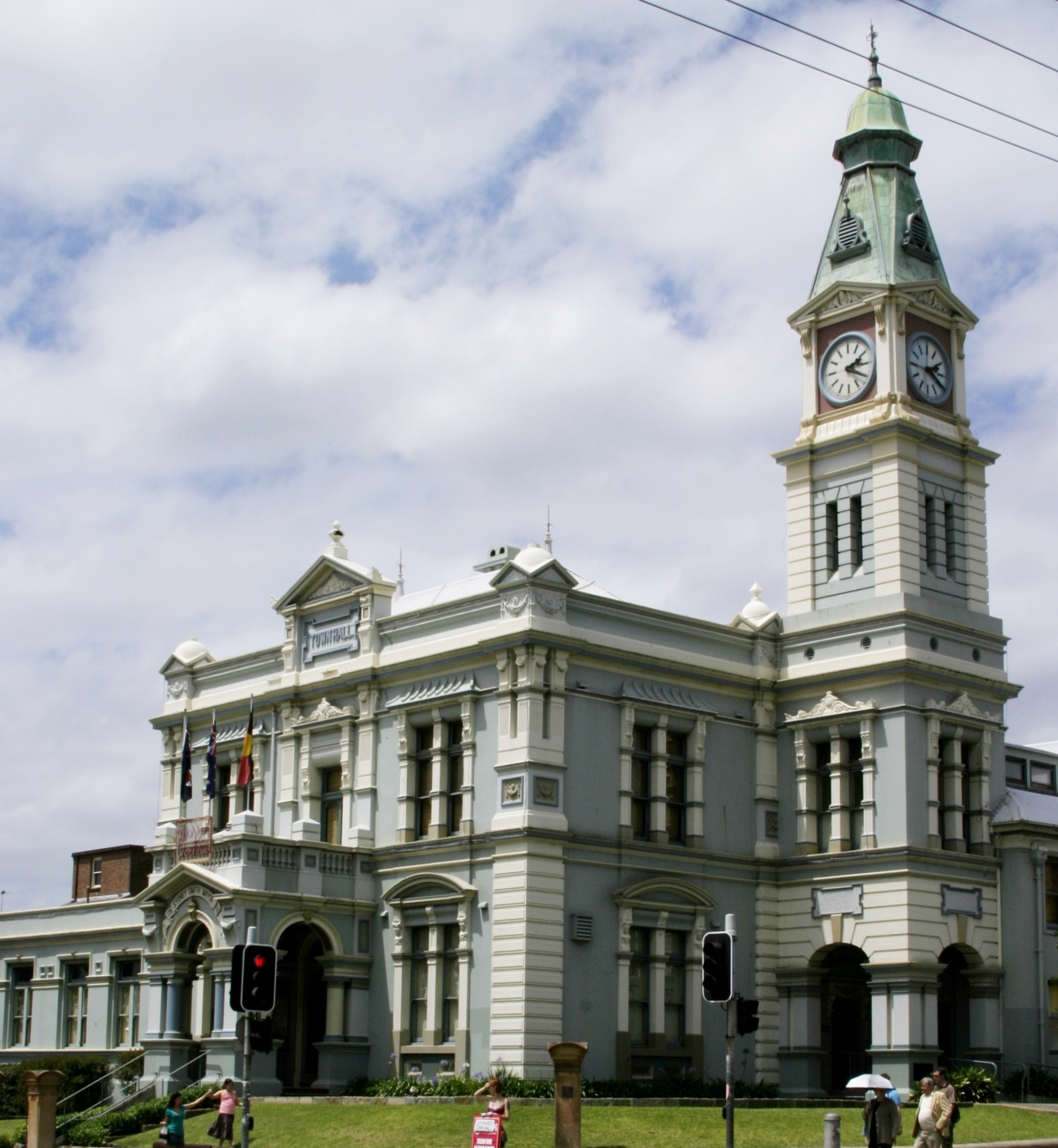
Leichhardt Town Hall, Leichhardt; completed in 1888

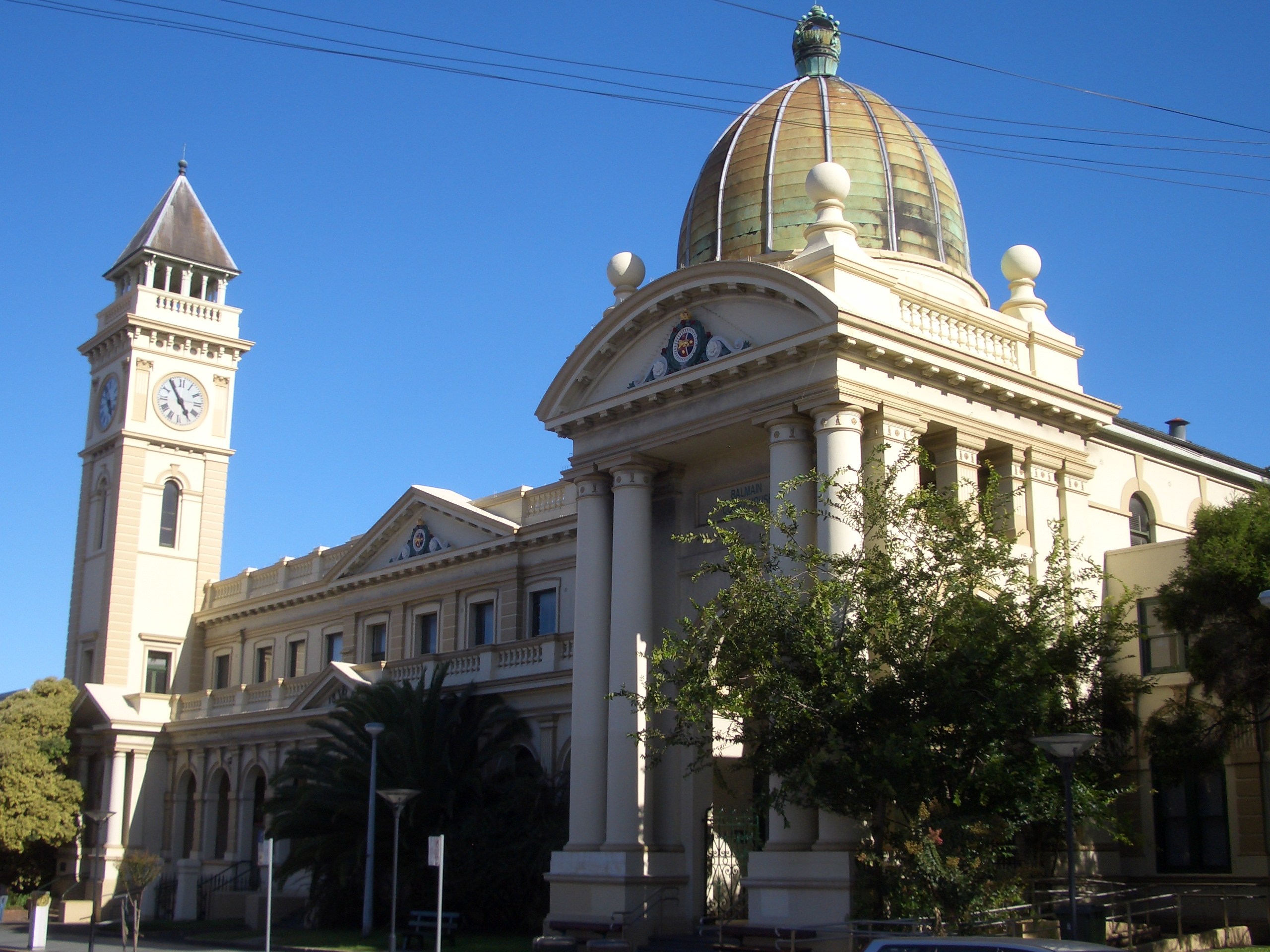
Balmain Court House, Balmain. Completed 1888

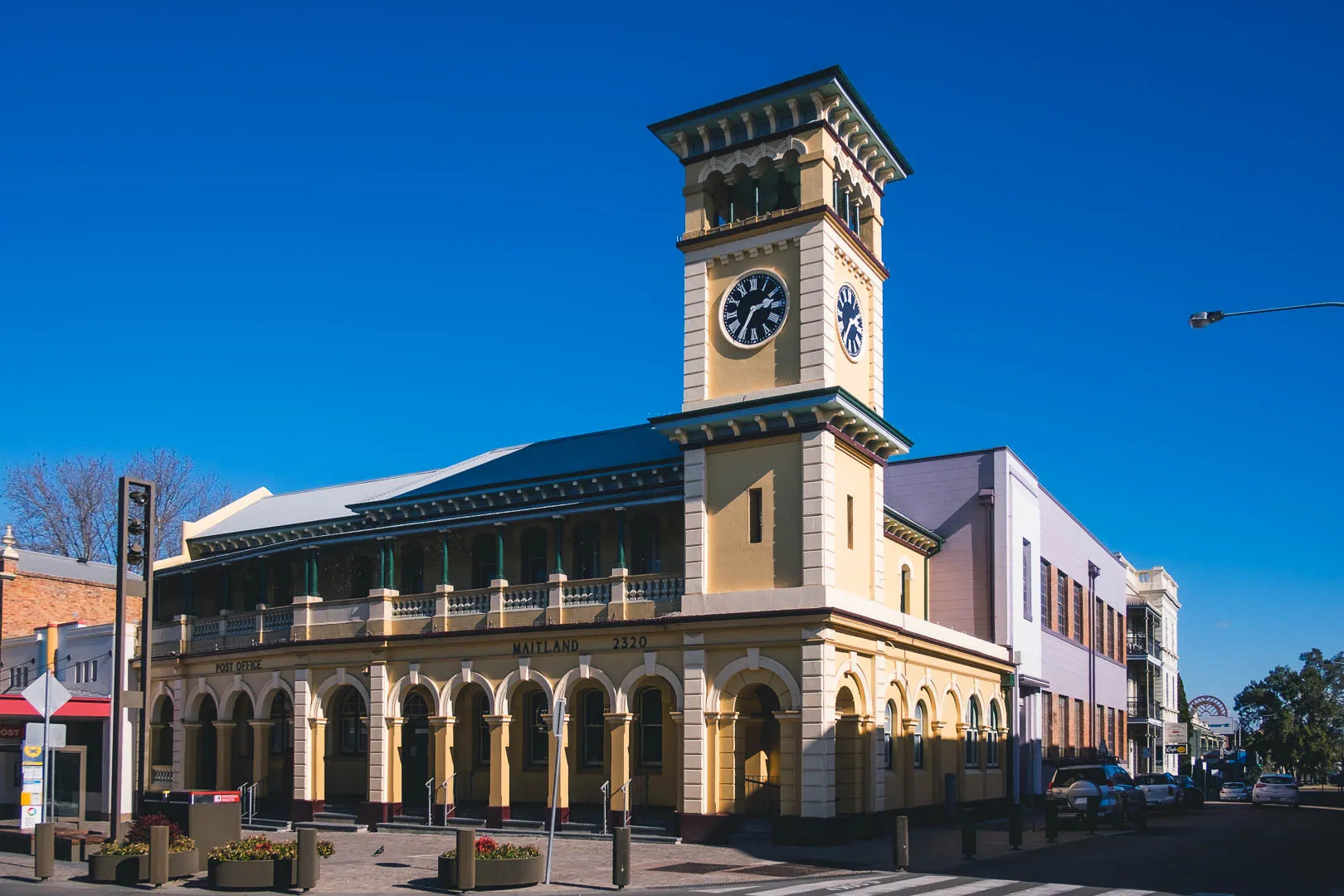
Maitland Post Office, Maitland. Completed in 1881

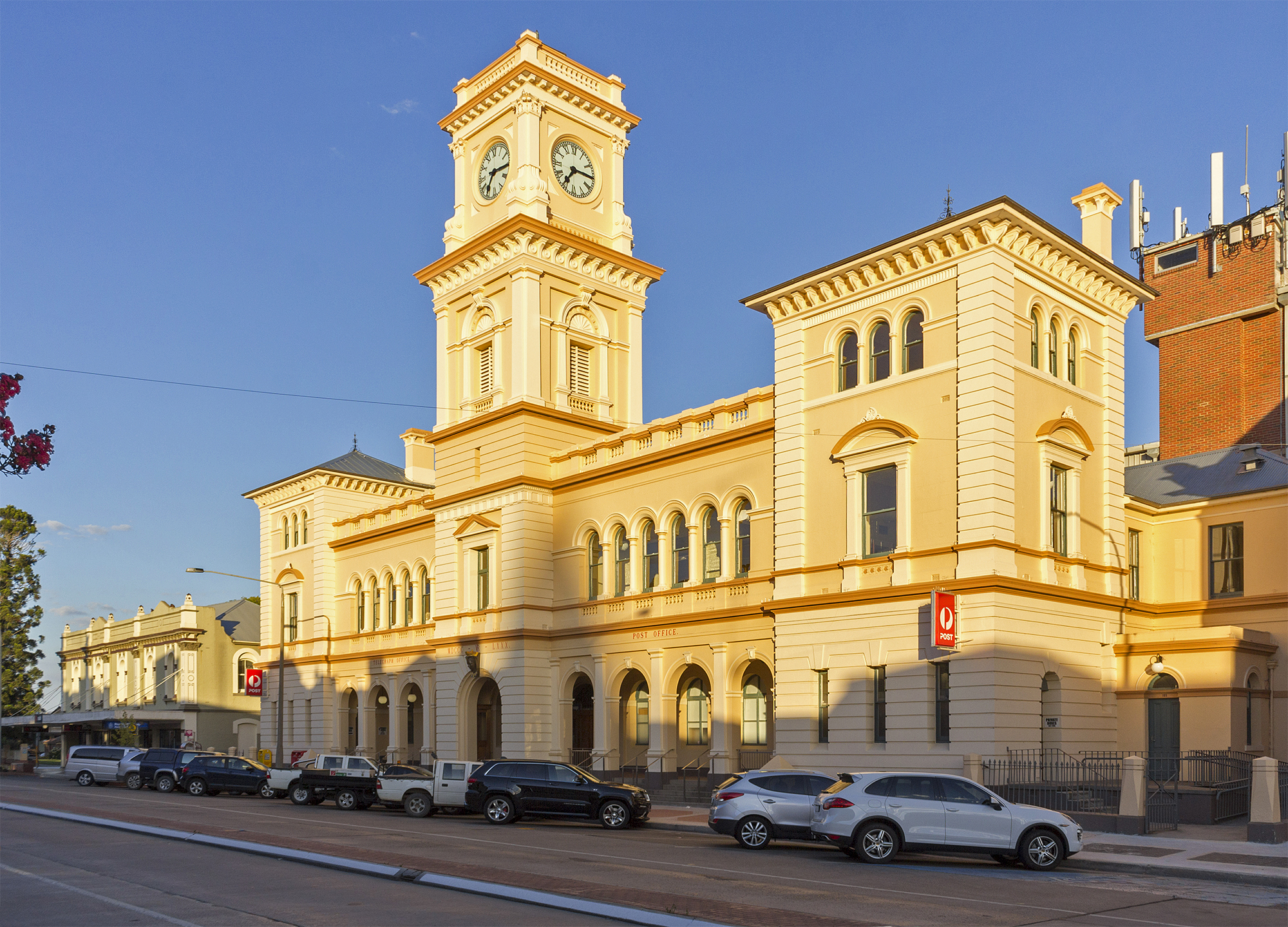
Goulburn Post Office, Goulburn. Completed 1881

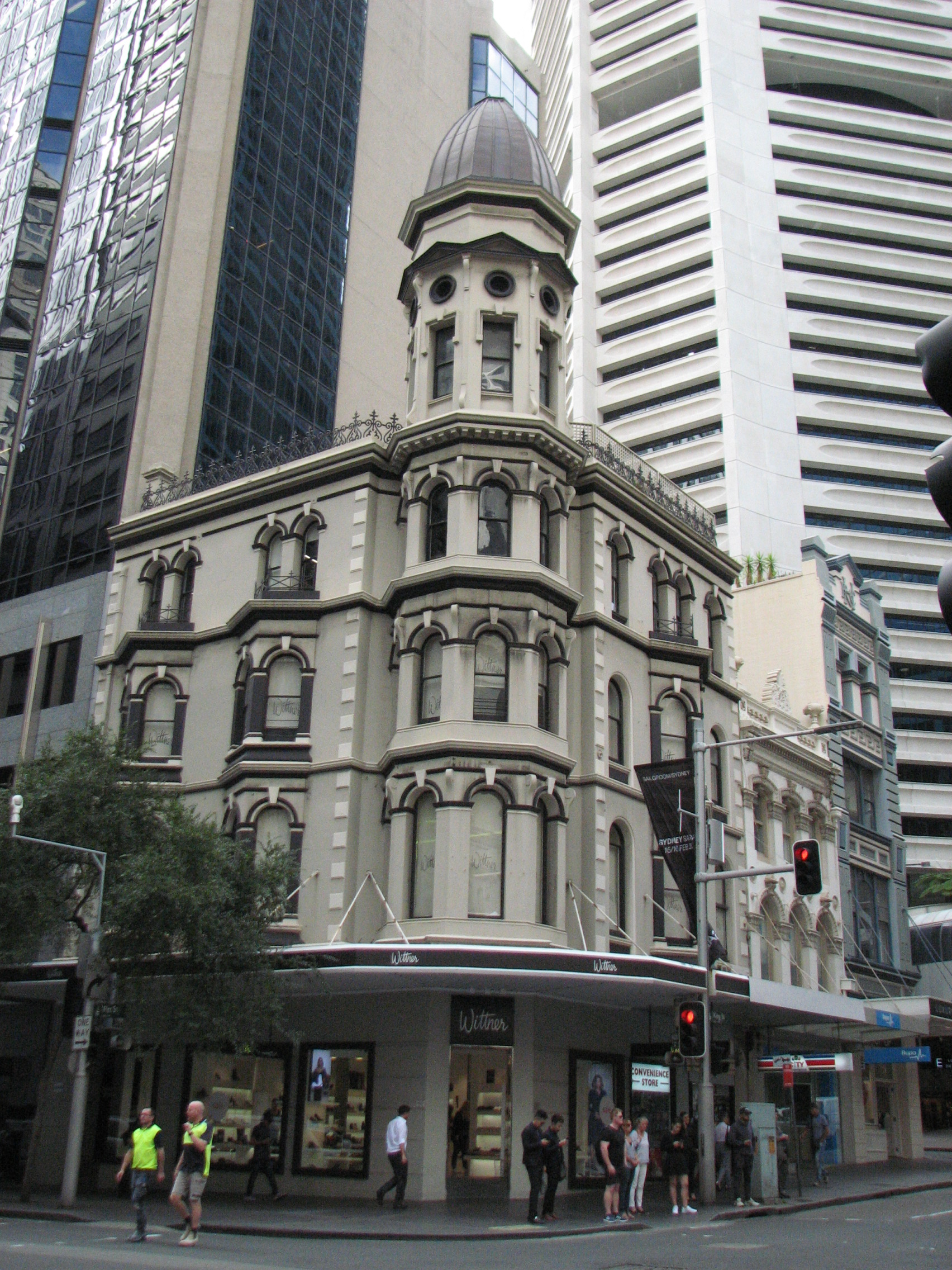
Kings Hotel, Sydney. Completed 1879

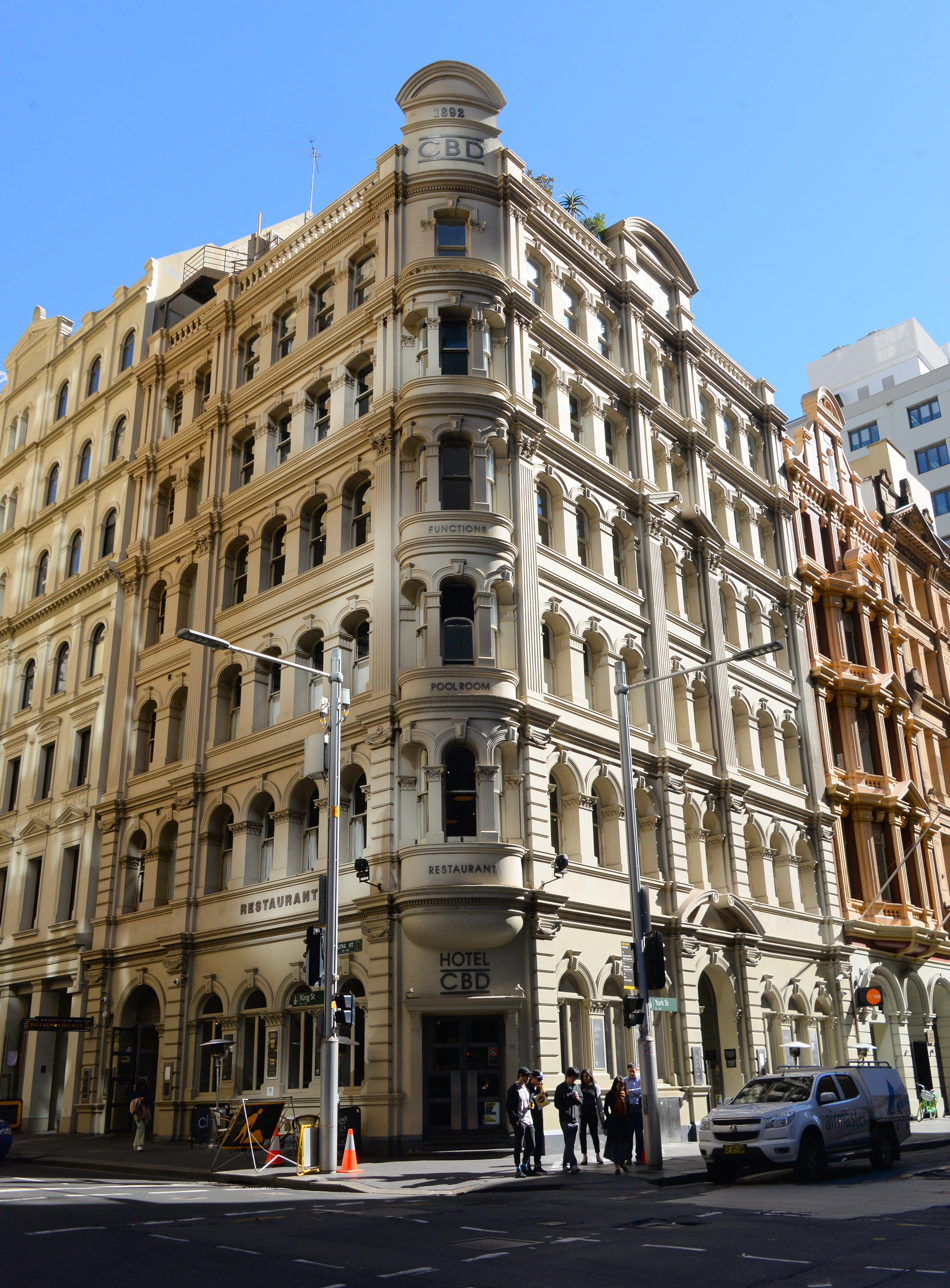
Former National House (now Hotel CBD), York Street, Sydney

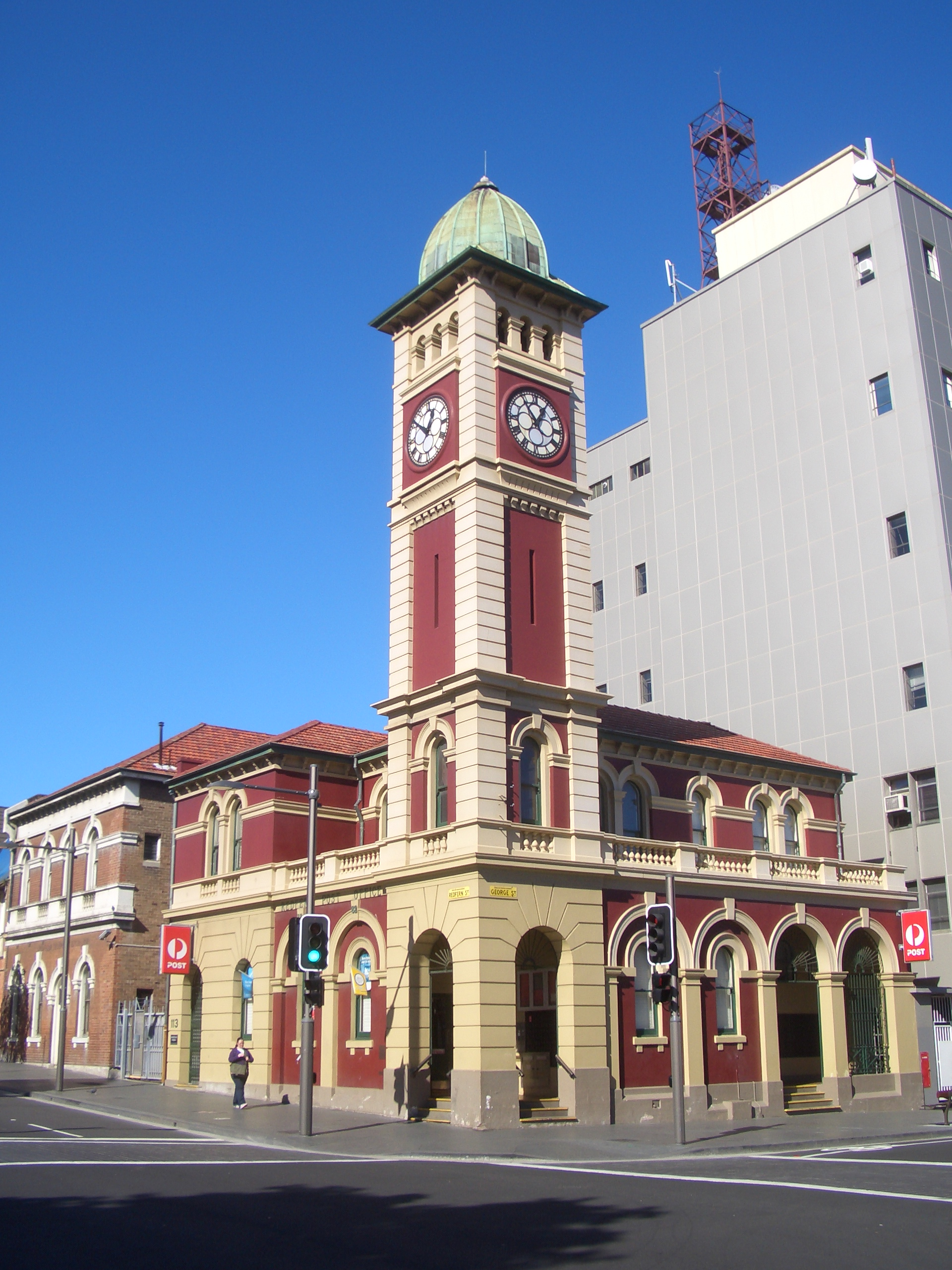
Redfern Post Office, Sydney. Completed 1882.

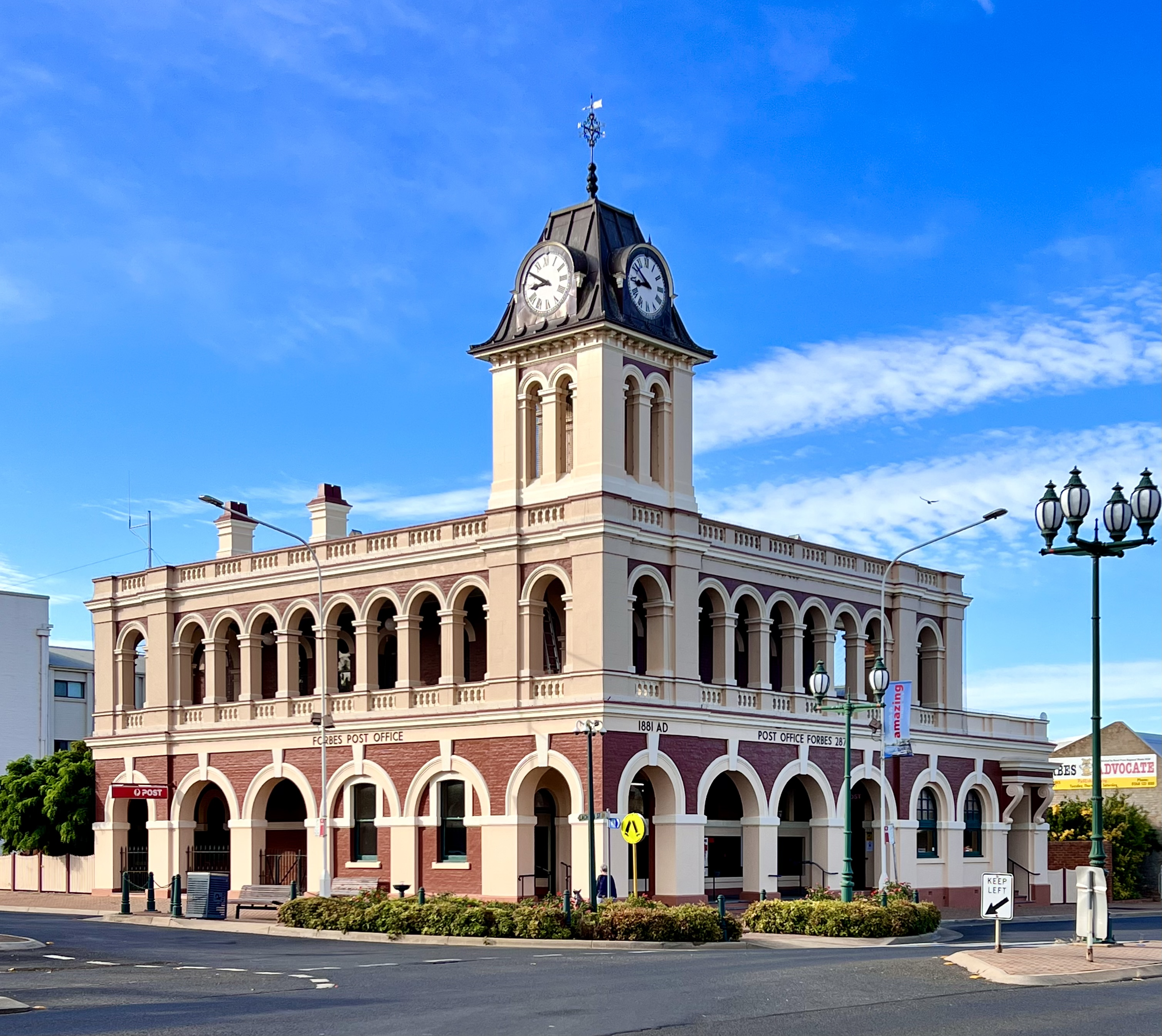
Forbes Post Office, Forbes. Completed 1881

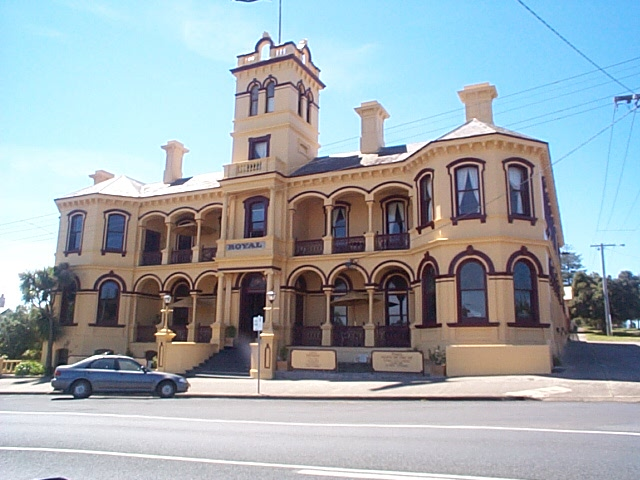
Royal Hotel, Queenscliff

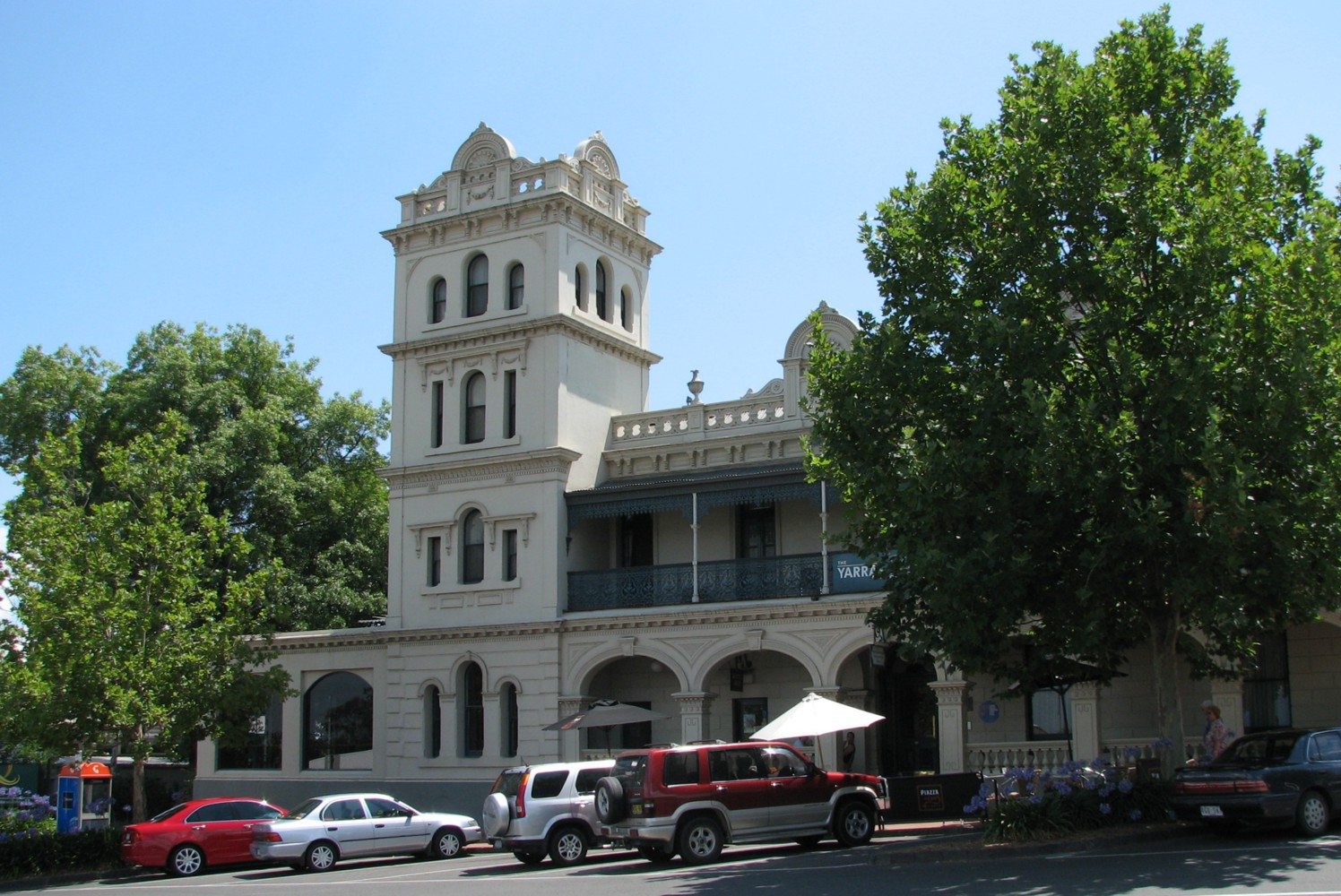
Grand Hotel, Yarra Glen

=== Victorian Romanesque ===
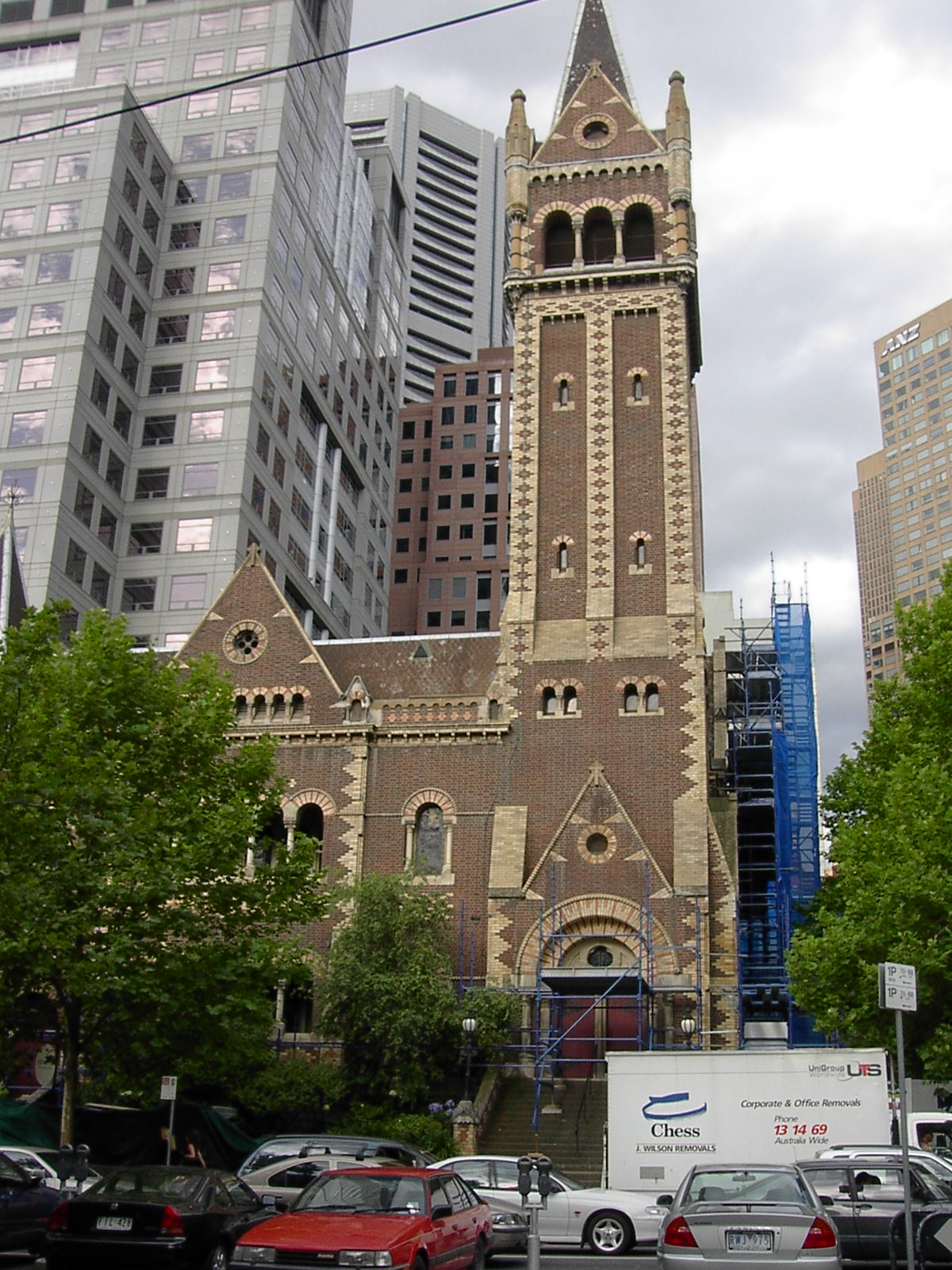
St Michael's Uniting Church, Melbourne; completed 1866

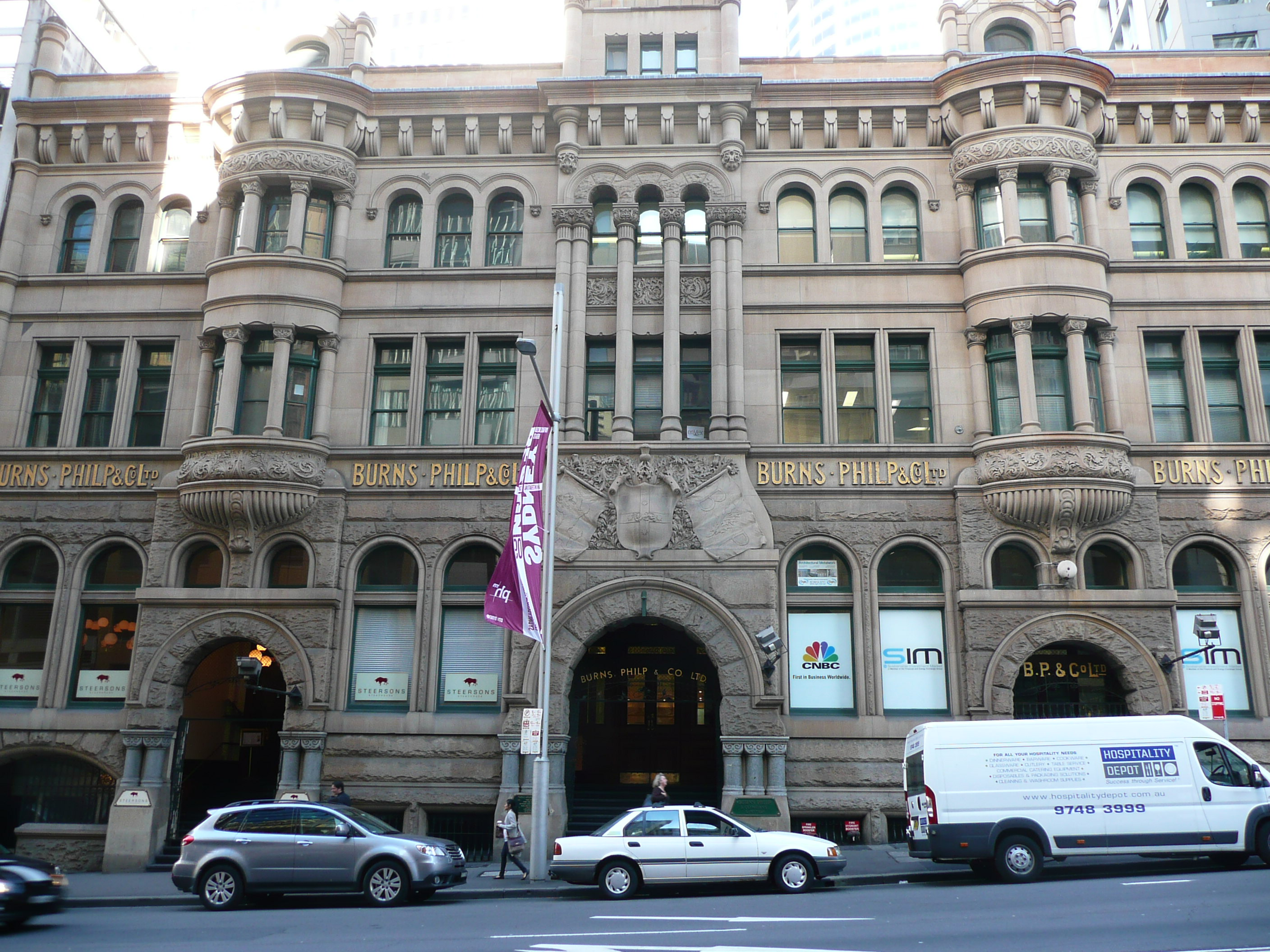
Burns Philp Building, Sydney; completed 1901

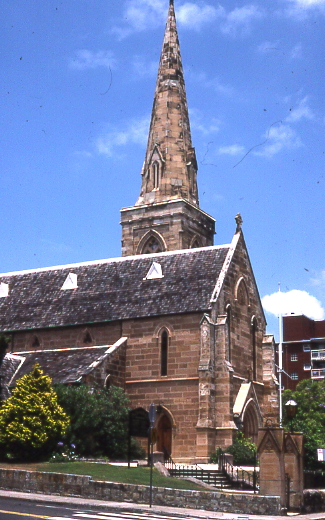
St Mark's Church, Darling Point

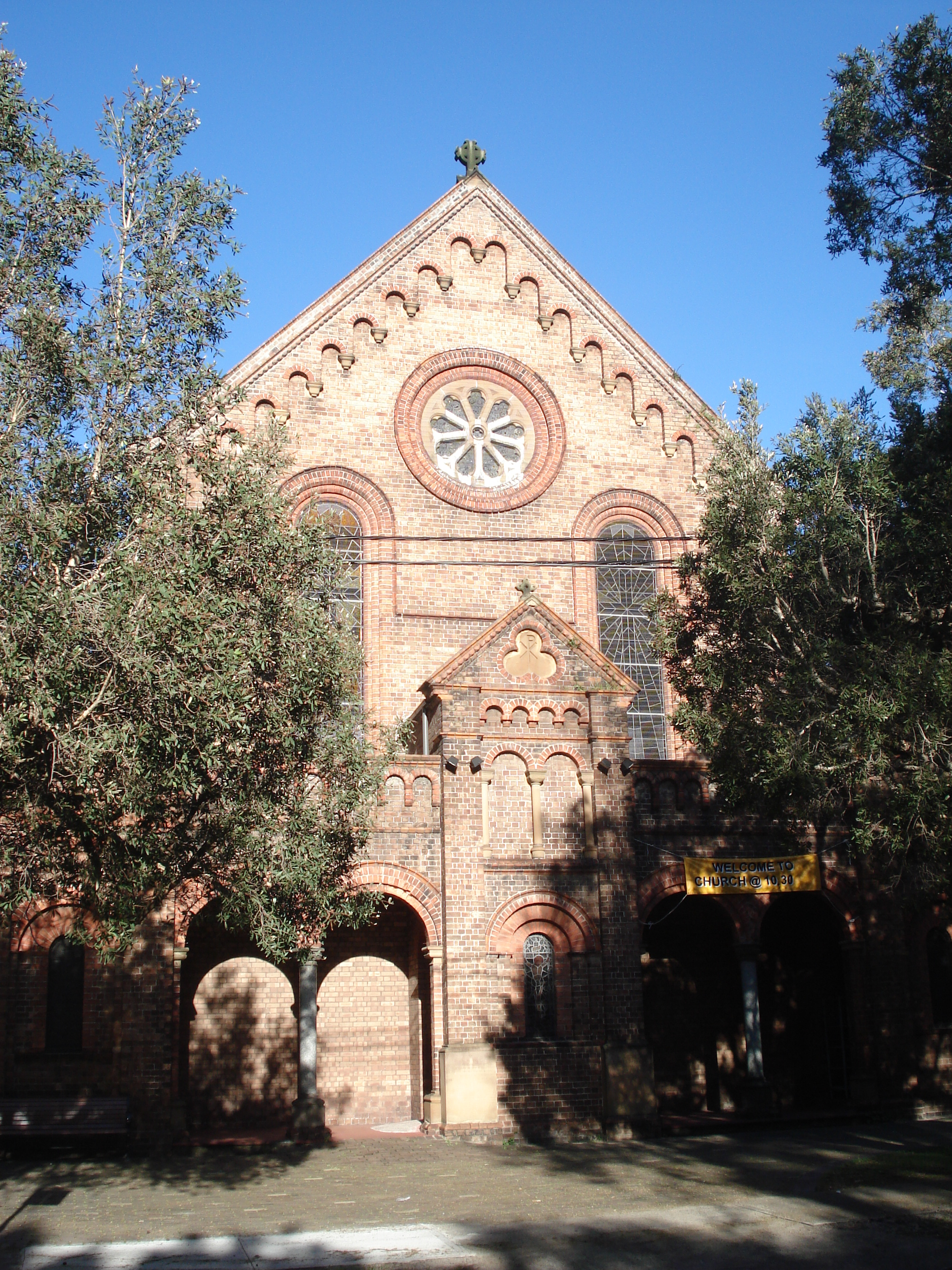
St Saviours Anglican Church, Redfern

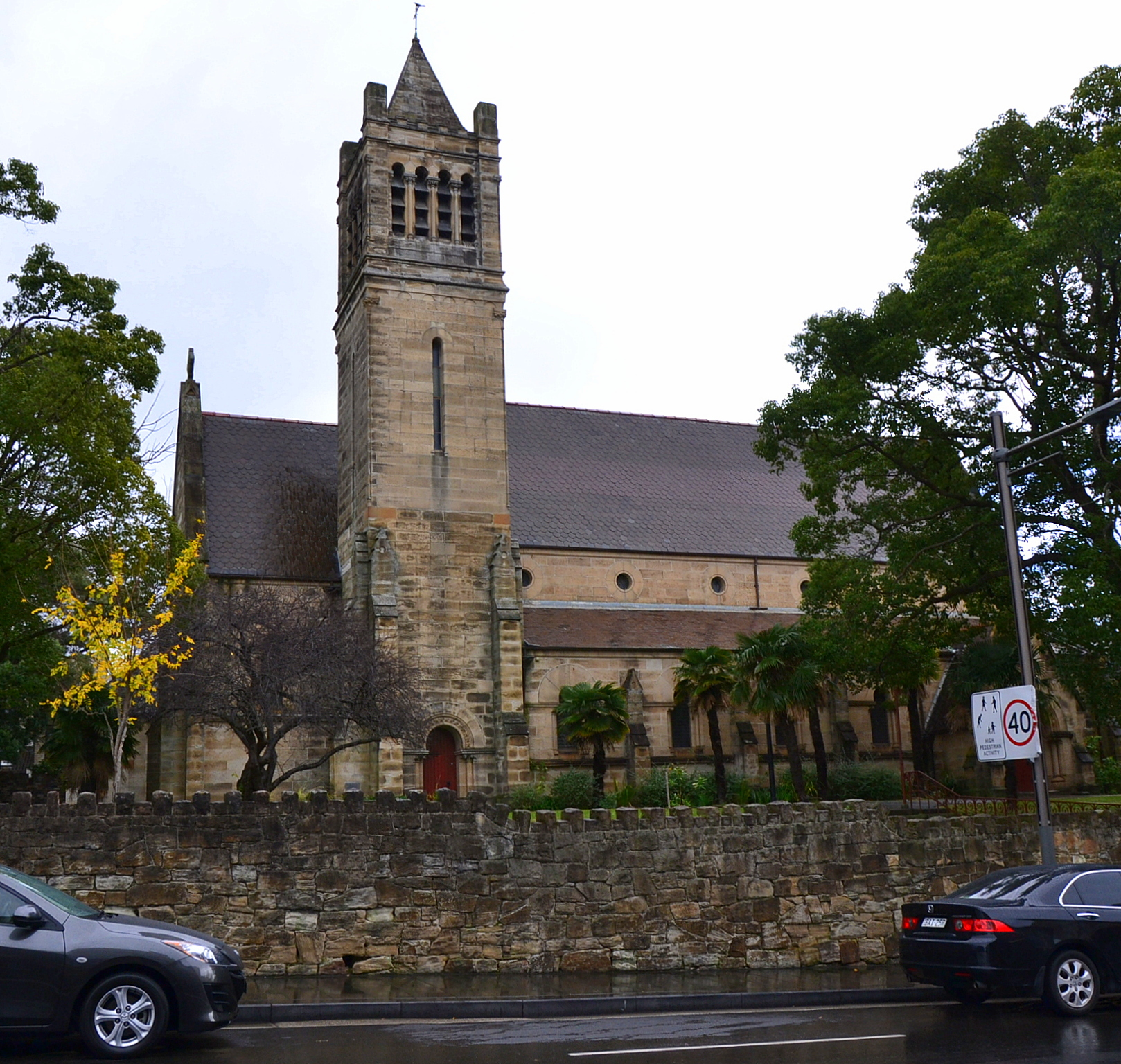
St Johns Church in Glebe; completed 1870

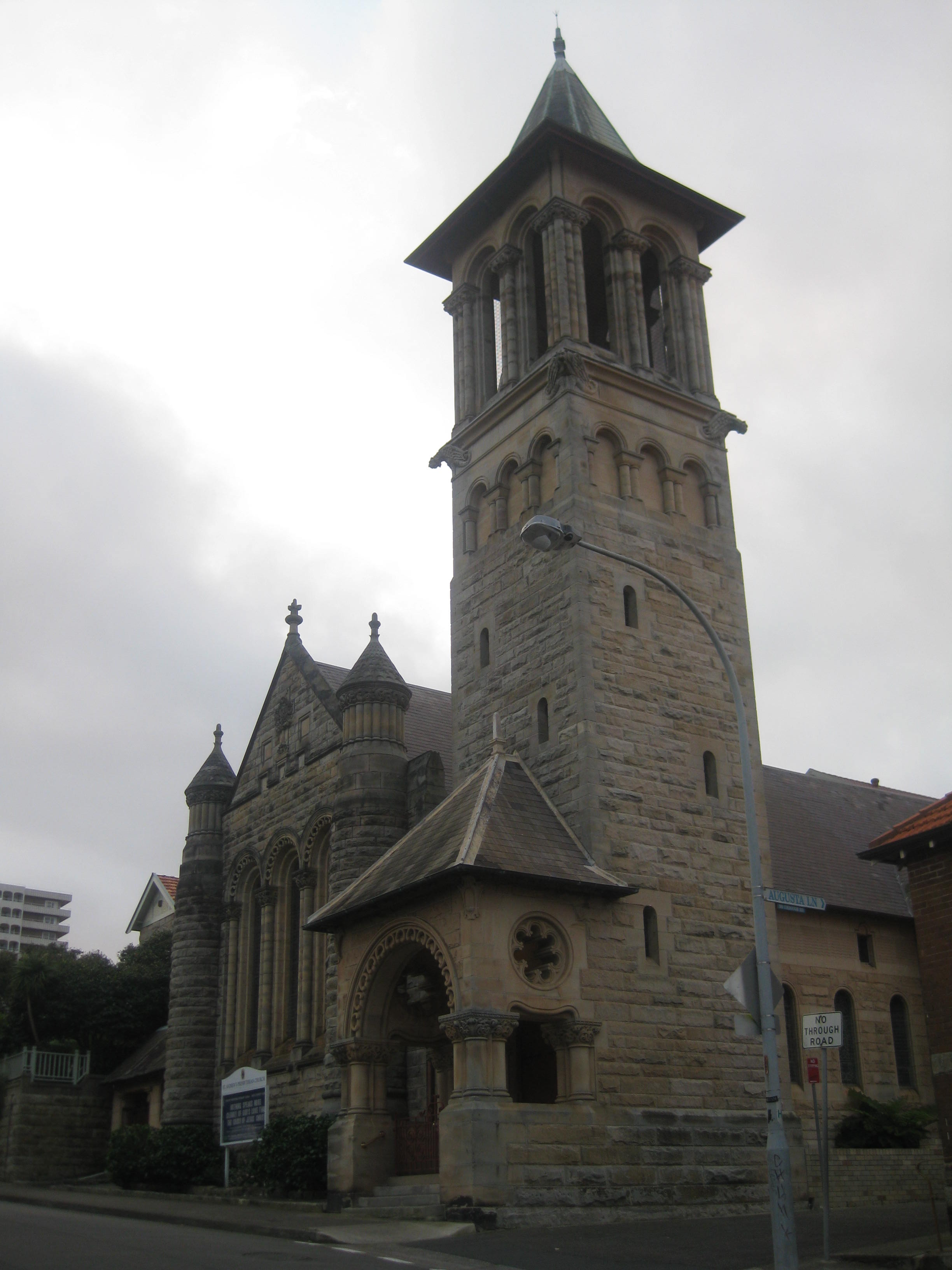
St Andrew's Presbyterian Church, Manly; completed in 1890

=== Victorian Renaissance Revival ===
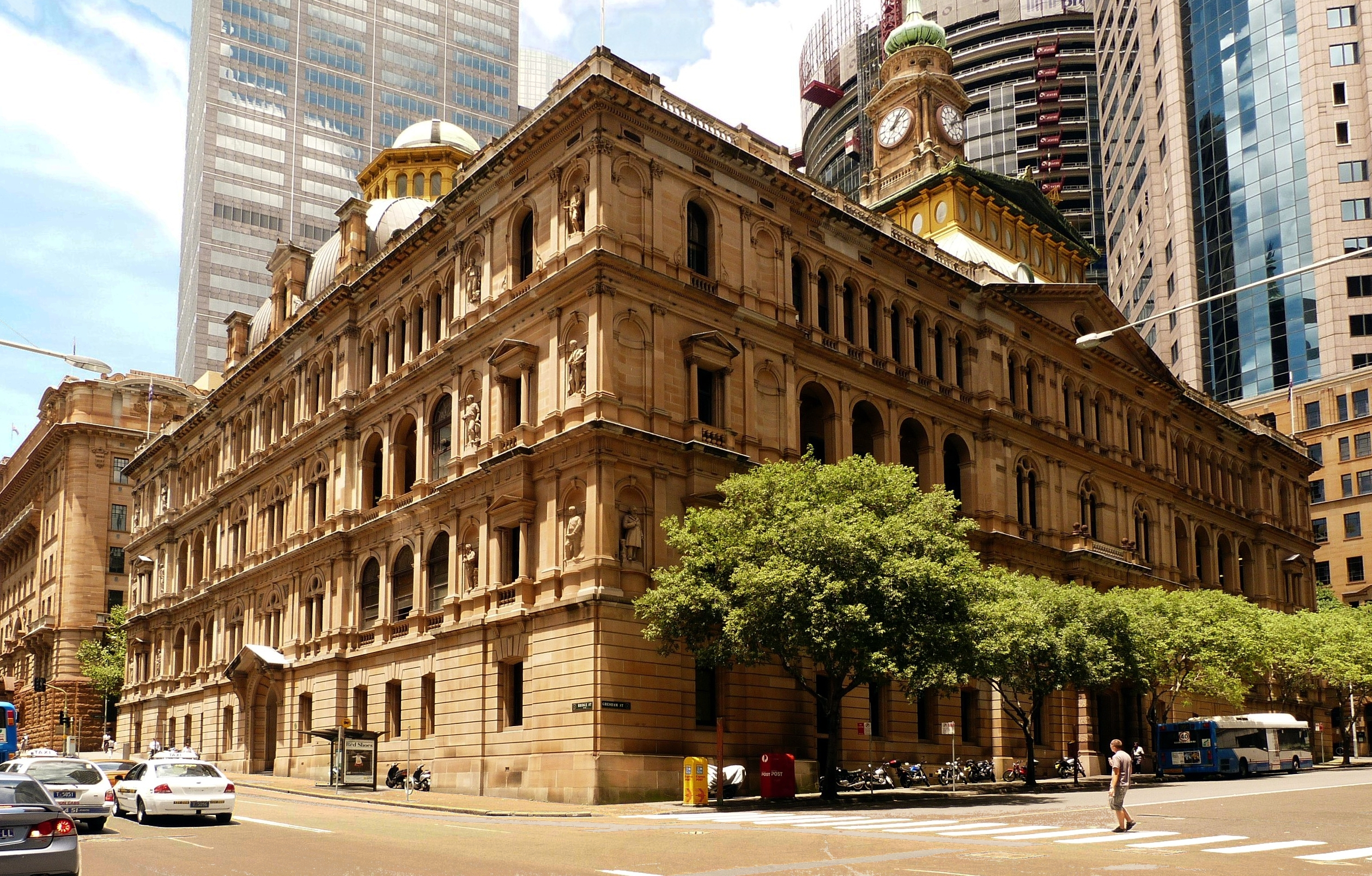
Department of Lands building, in Bridge Street, Sydney, constructed between 1876 and 1892.

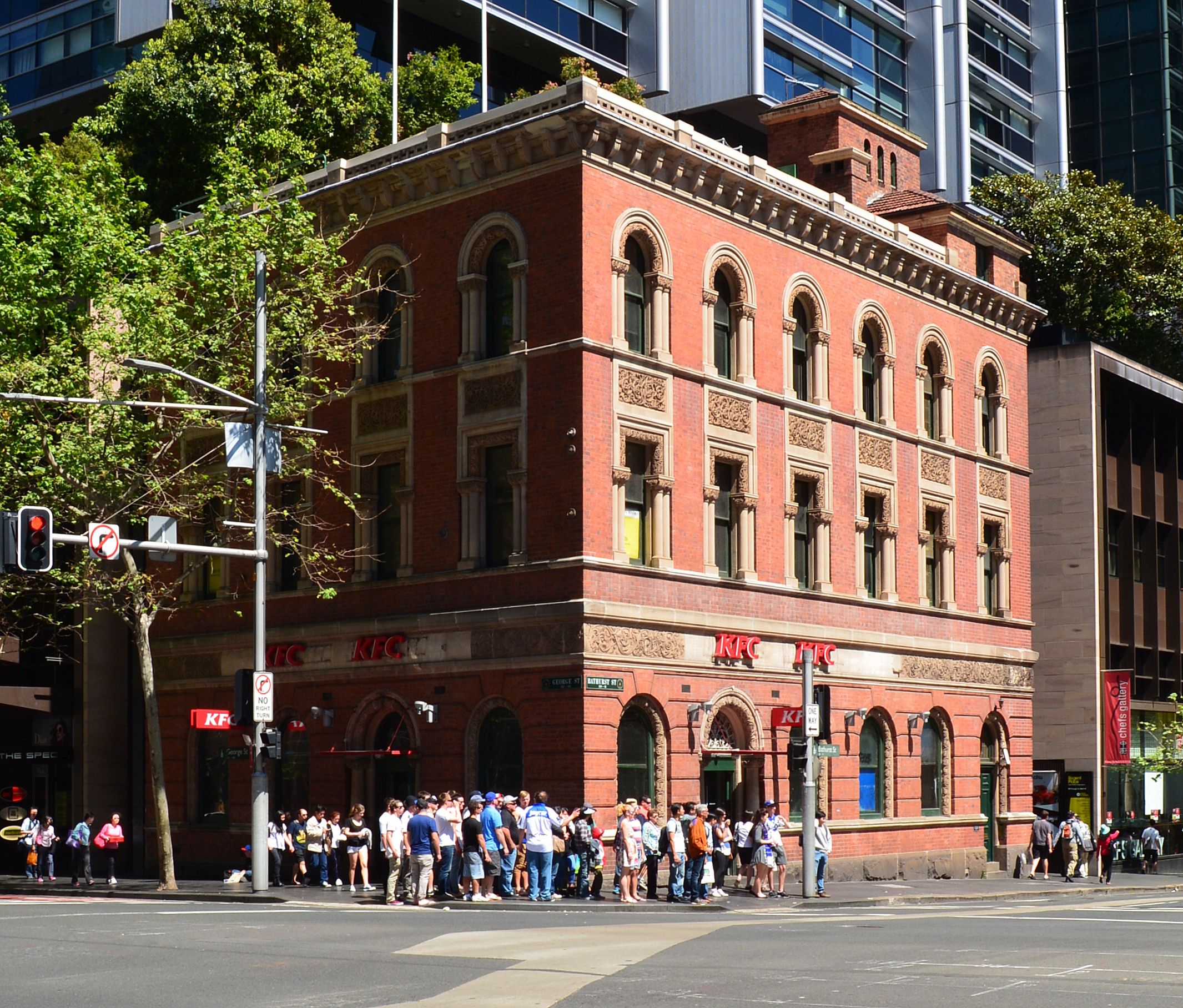
Former Bank of NSW building, now KFC fast food restaurant, located at 107-109 Bathurst Street, Sydney, constructed between 1894 and 1895.

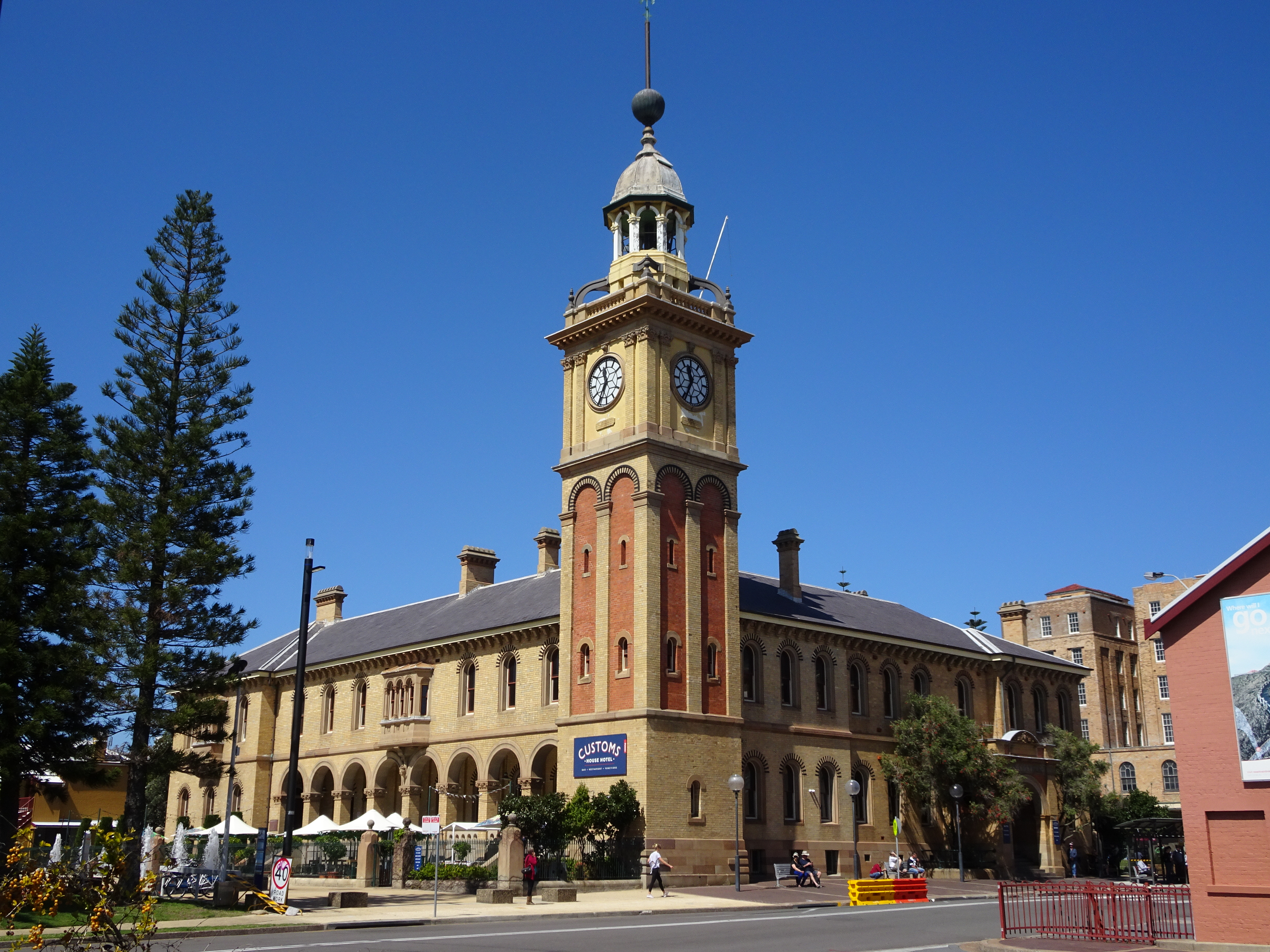
Newcastle Customs House, completed 1899

=== Victorian Byzantine ===
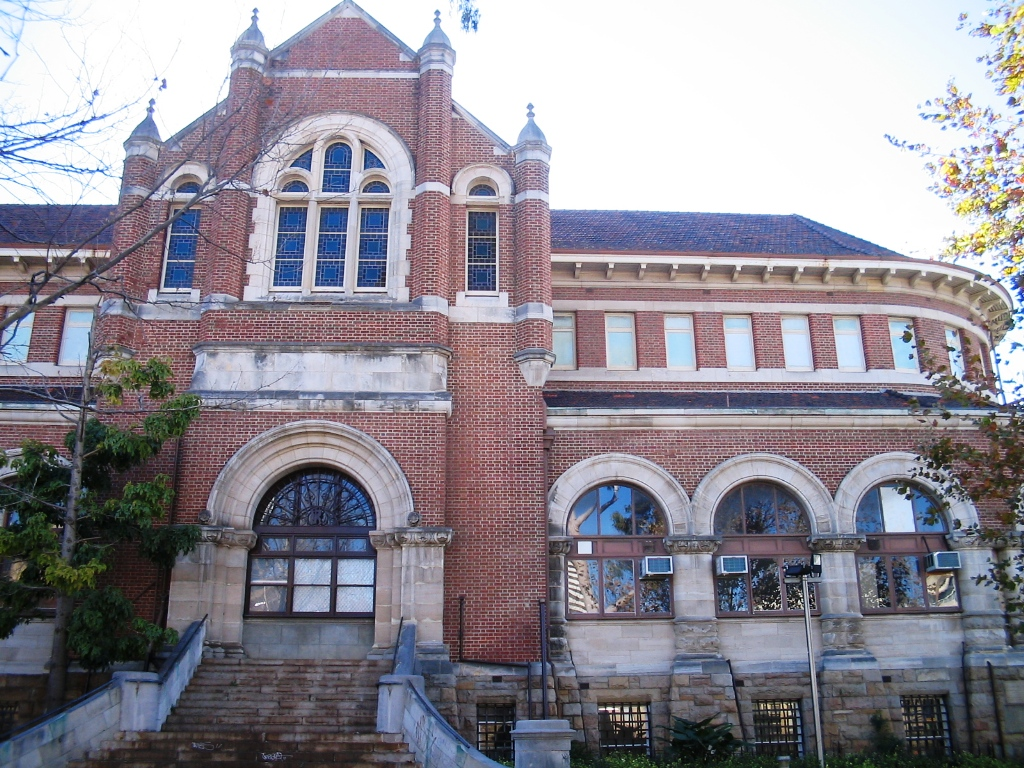
Jubilee Building, Perth; opened 1899

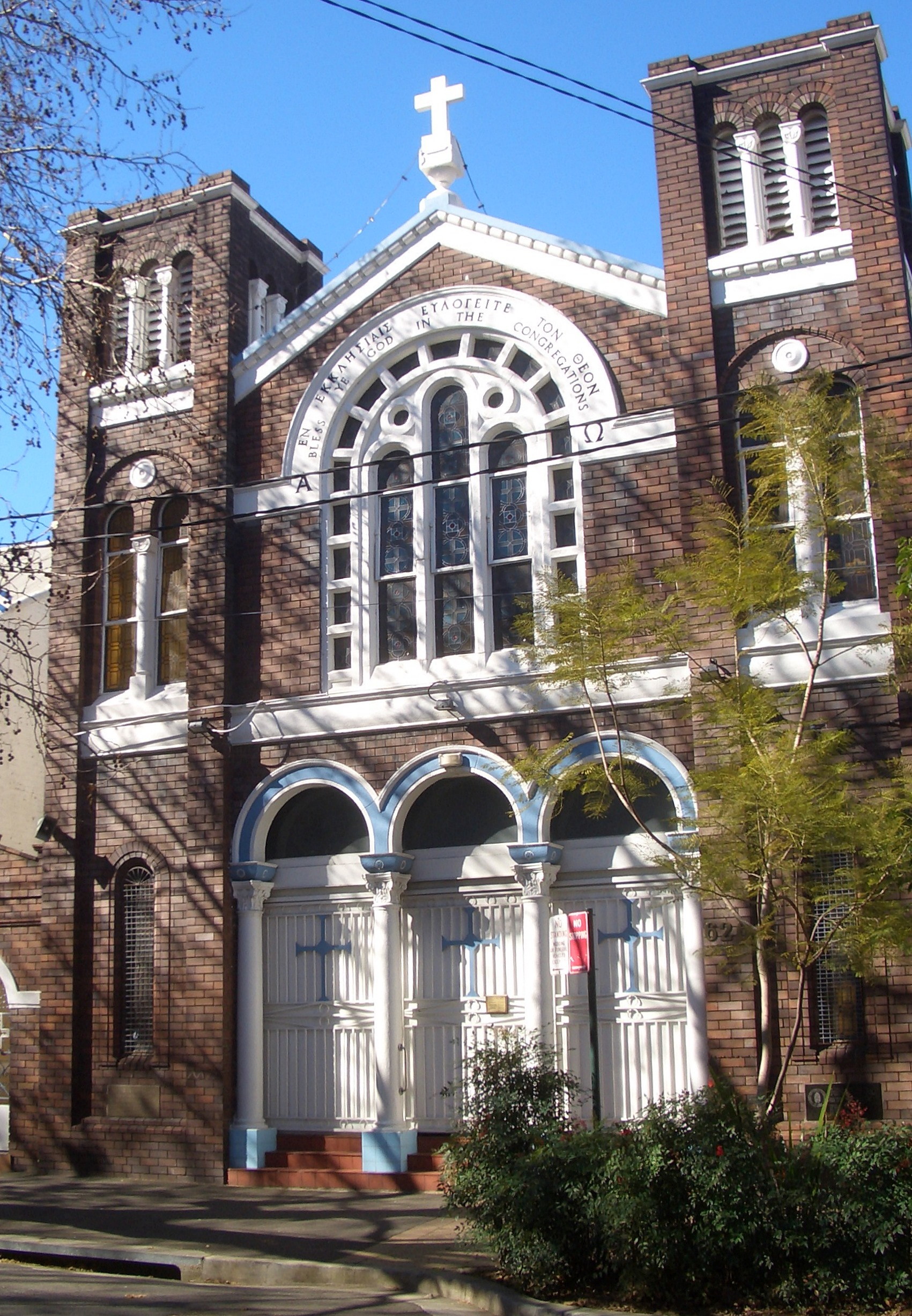
Holy Trinitity Orthodox Church; Surry Hills. Completed 1890s

=== Victorian Academic Gothic ===
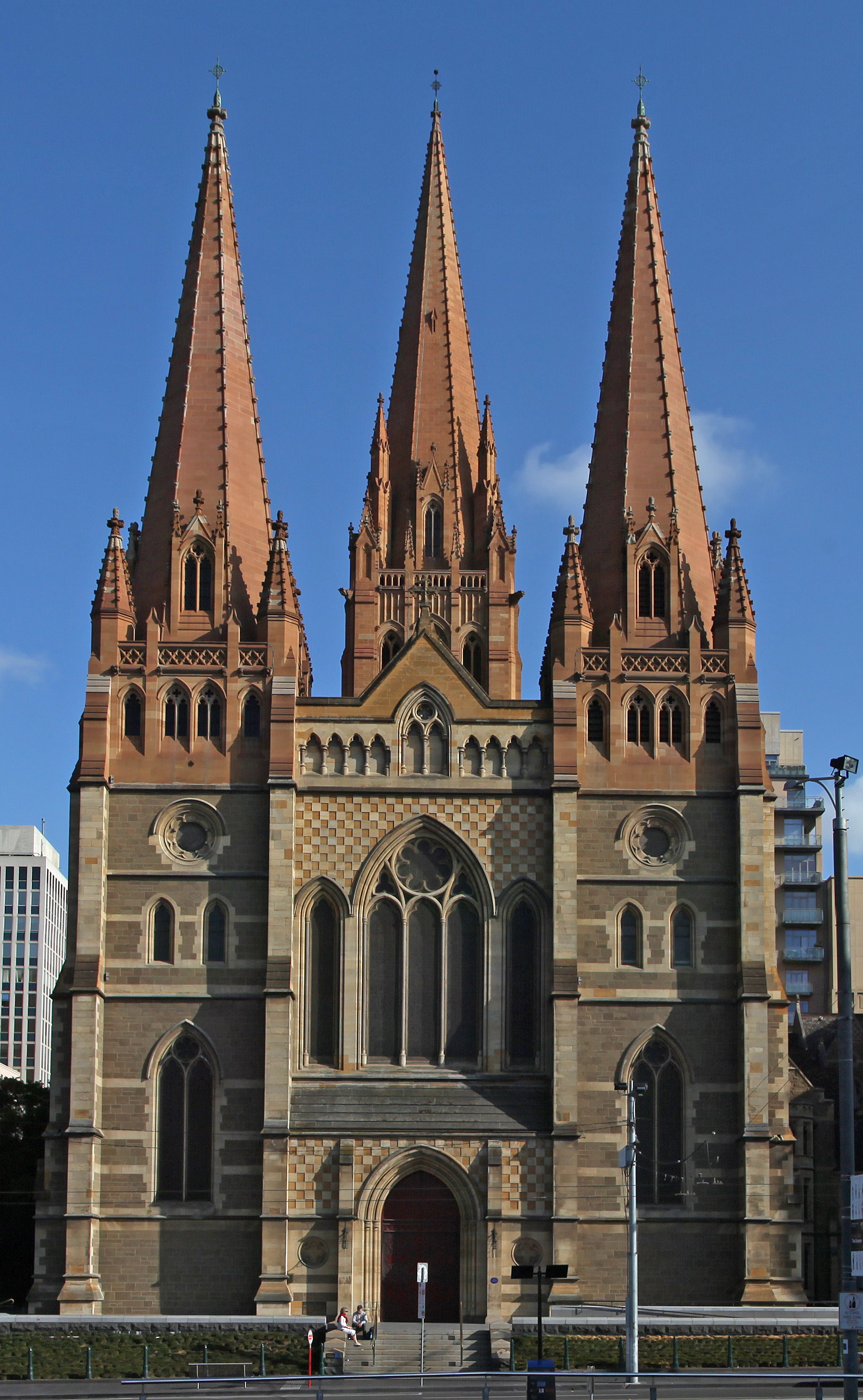
St Paul's Cathedral, Melbourne

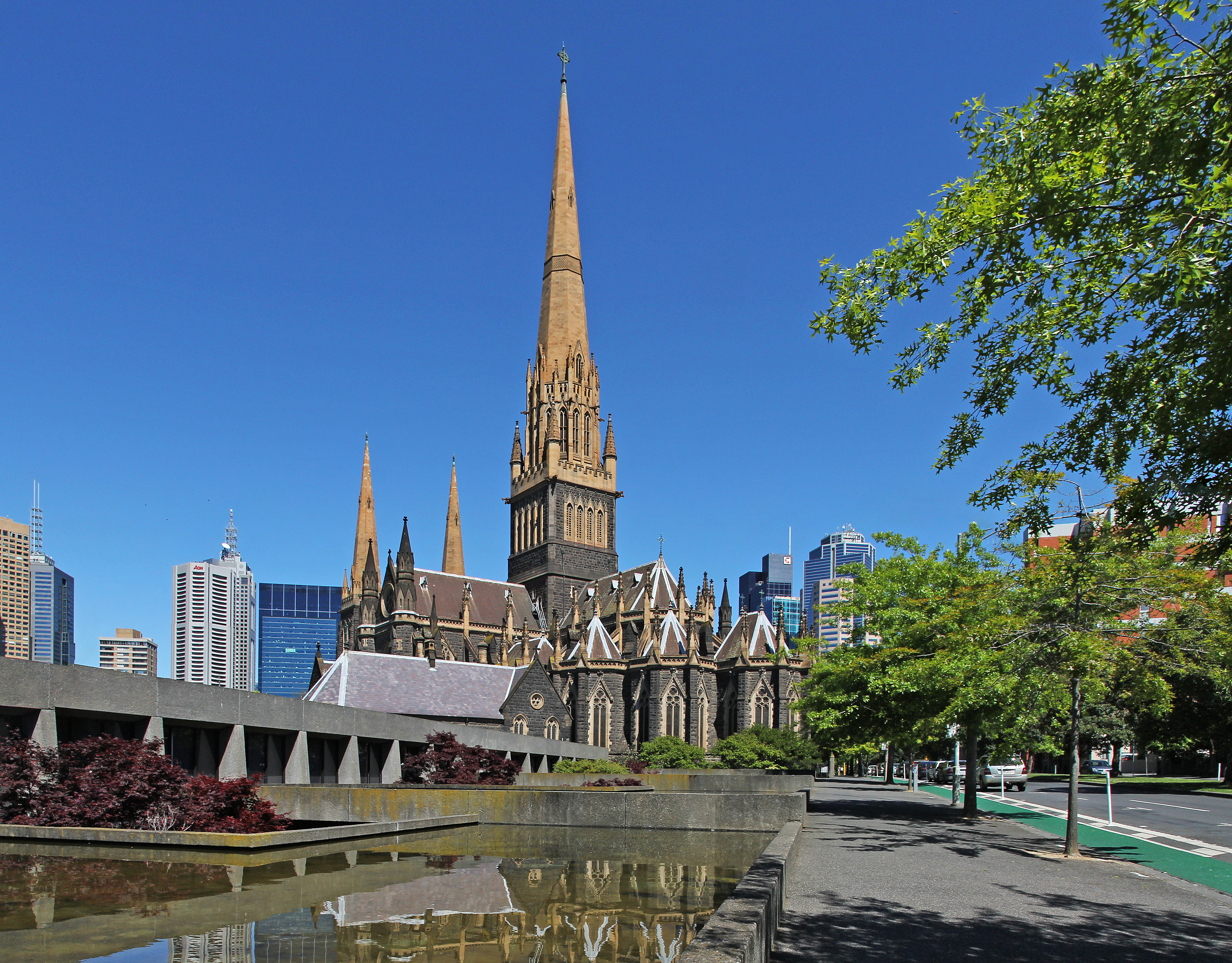
St Patrick's Cathedral, Melbourne

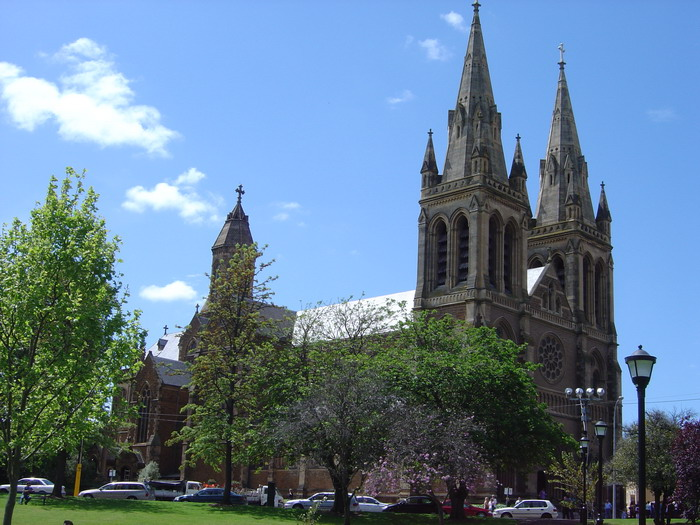
St Peter's Cathedral, Adelaide; completed 1901

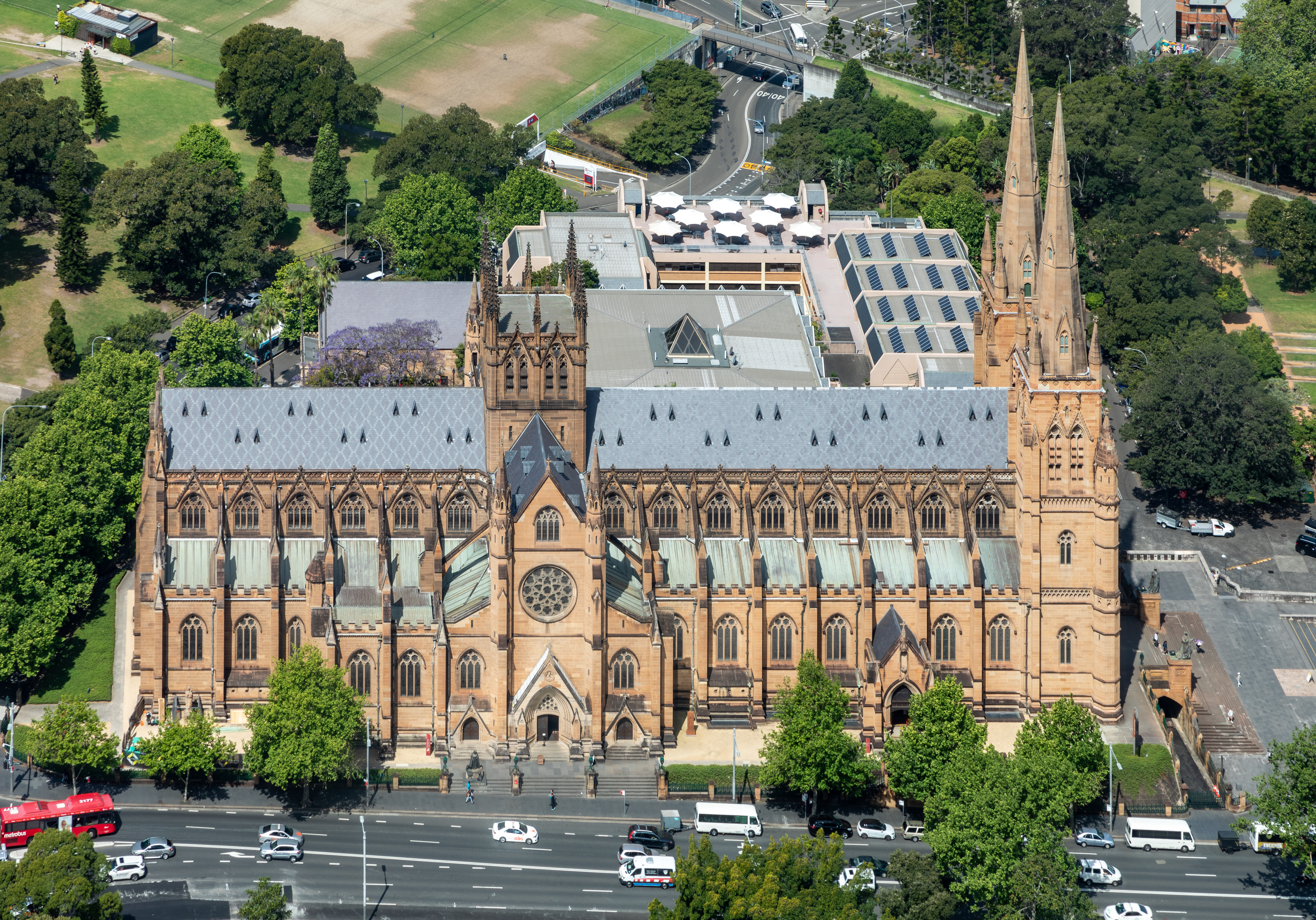
St Mary's Cathedral, Sydney

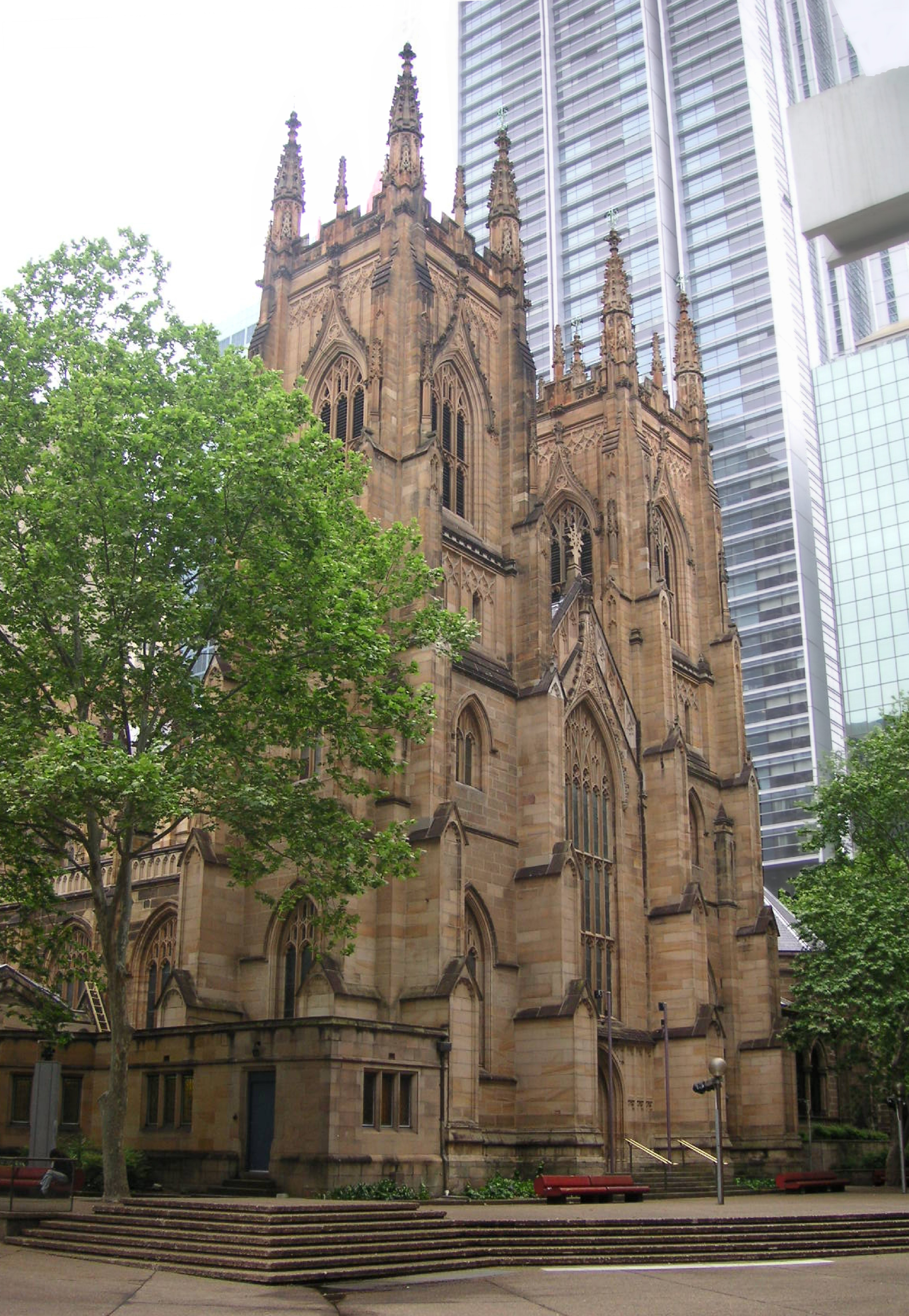
St Andrew's Cathedral, Sydney. Completed 1868

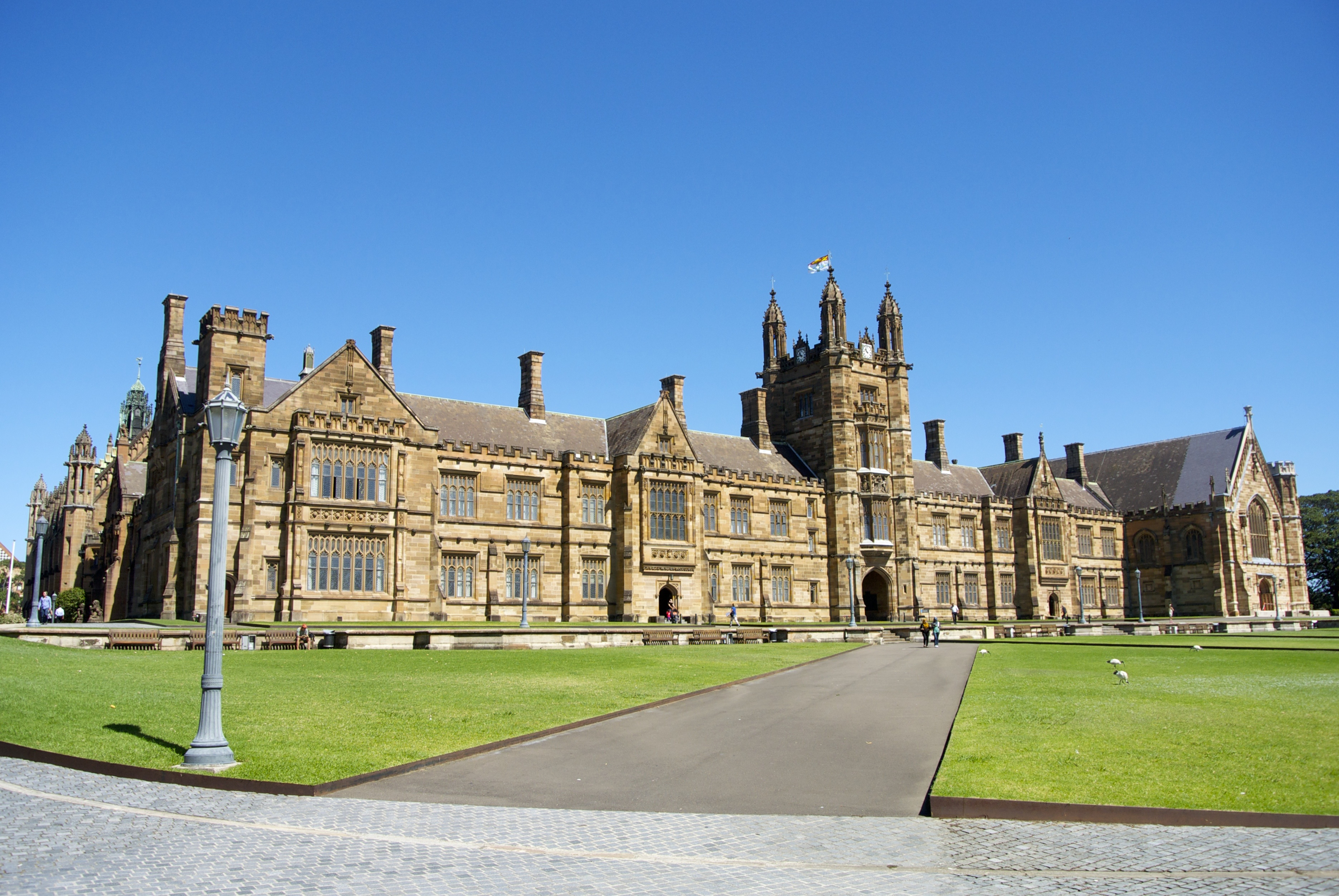
University of Sydney (main quadrangle); completed 1855

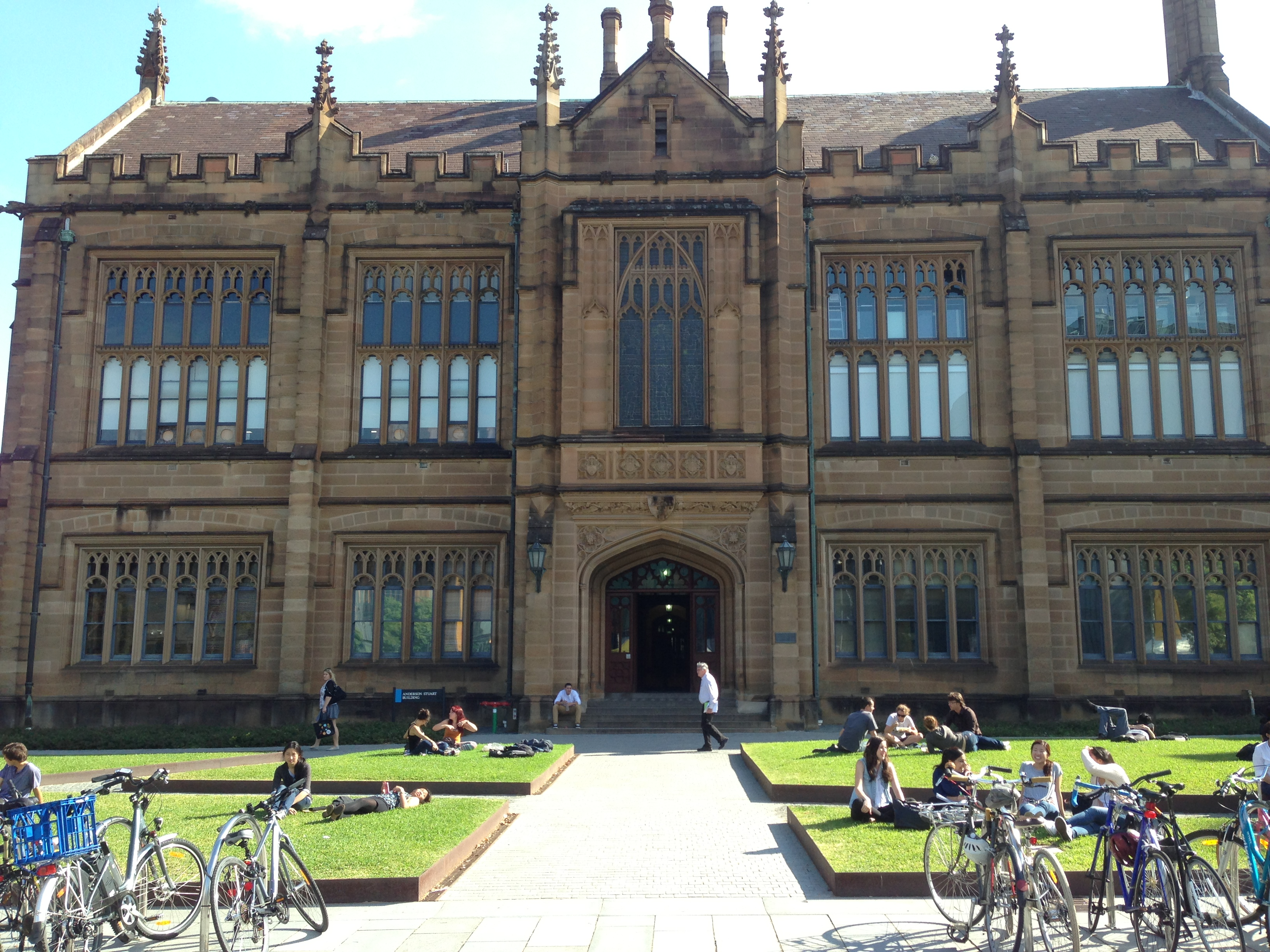
Anderson Stuart Building (University of Sydney); completed 1883

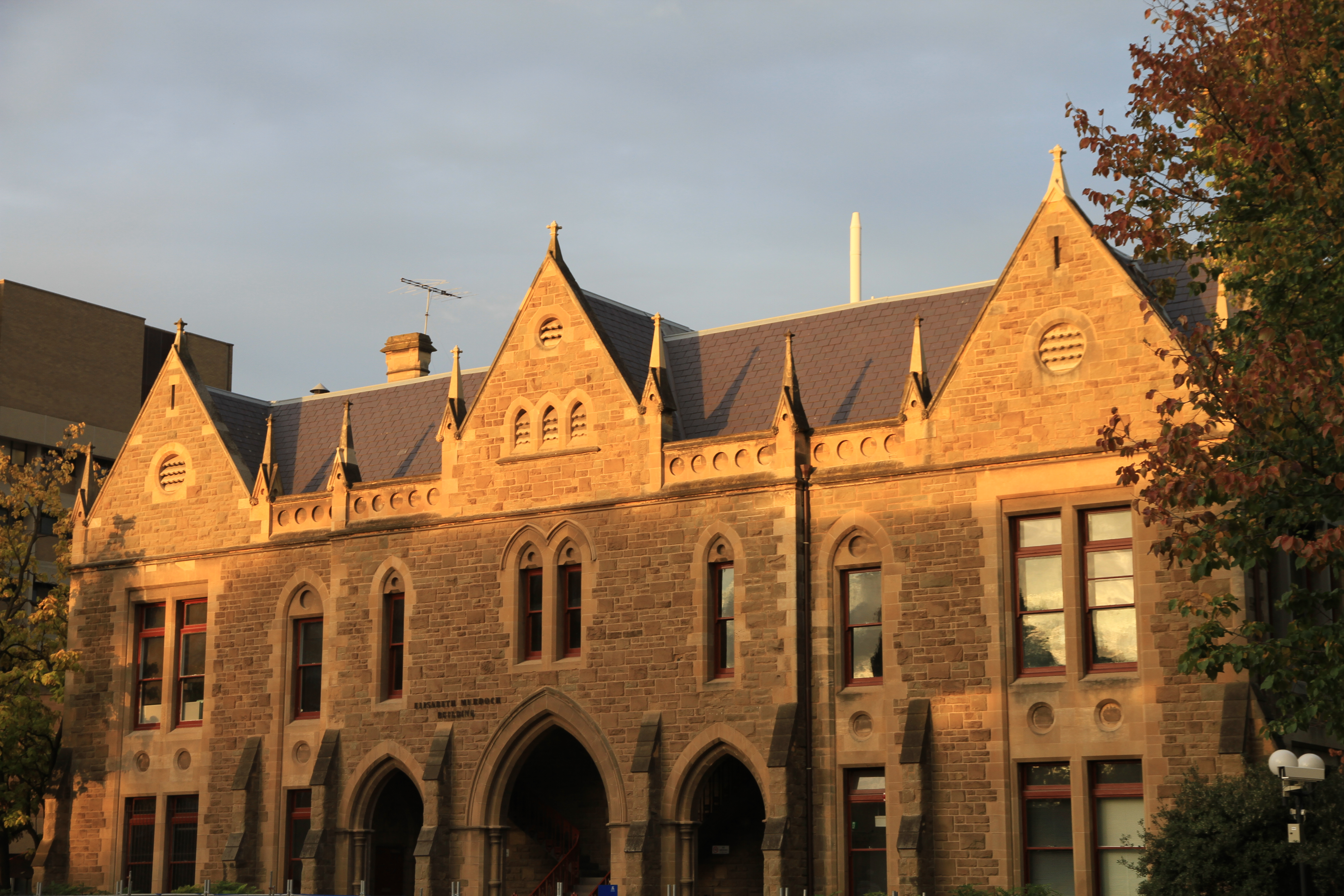
Old Pathology Building Melbourne University; completed 1885

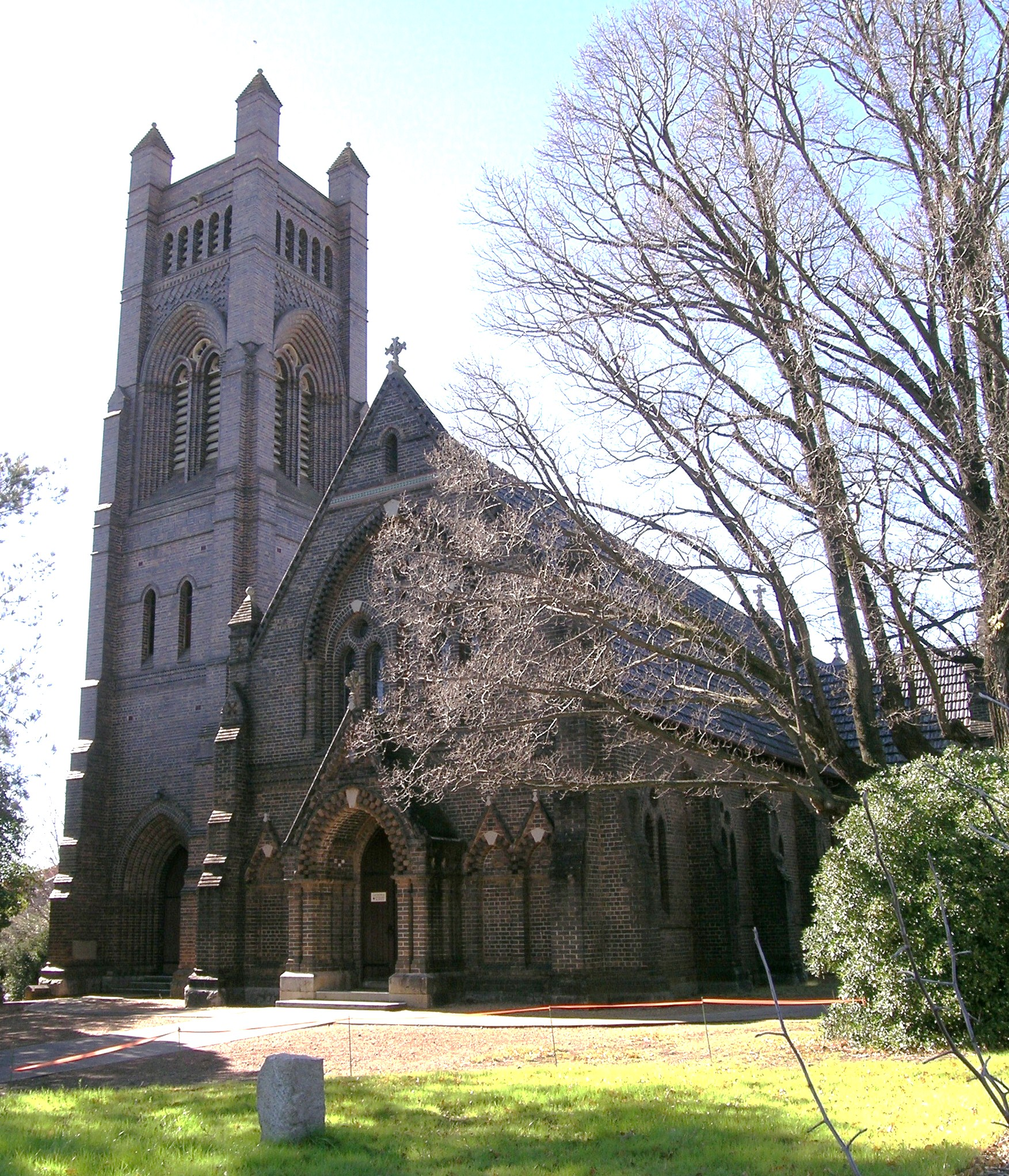
St Peter's Cathedral, Armidale. Completed 1875

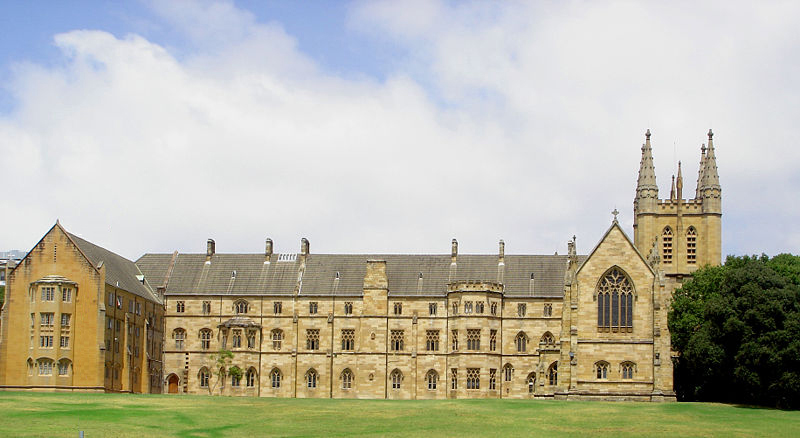
St John's College, Sydney

=== Victorian Free Gothic ===
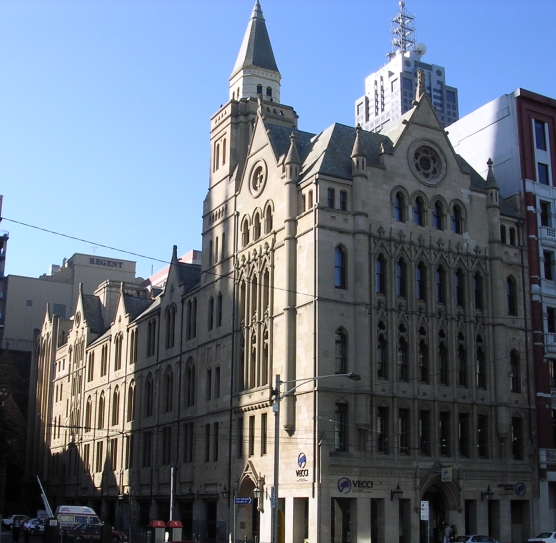
Former Metropolitan Gas Company Buildings; Flinders Street, Melbourne; completed 1892; Venetian Gothic applied to a tall building

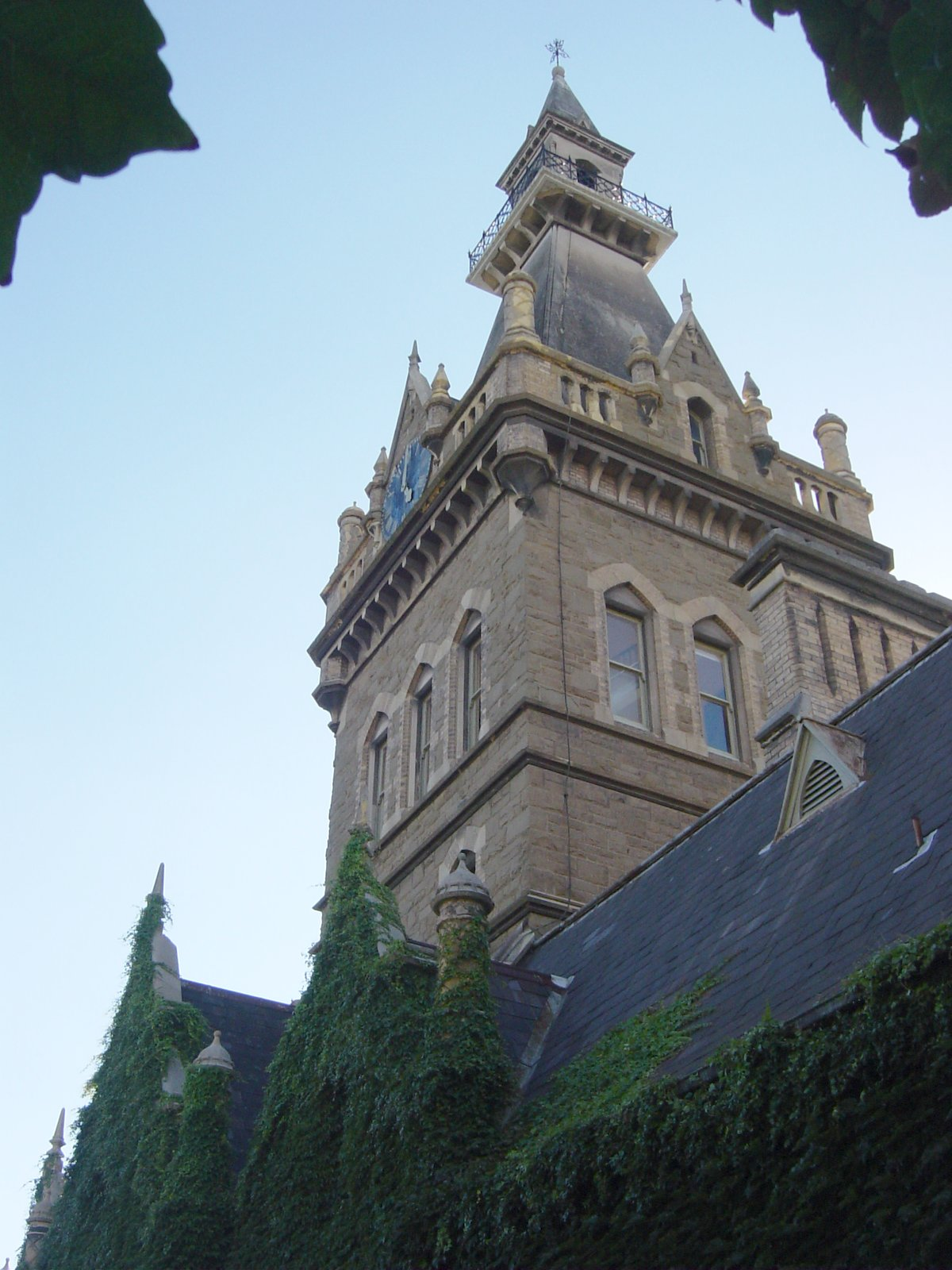
Ormond College, Melbourne University; completed 1881

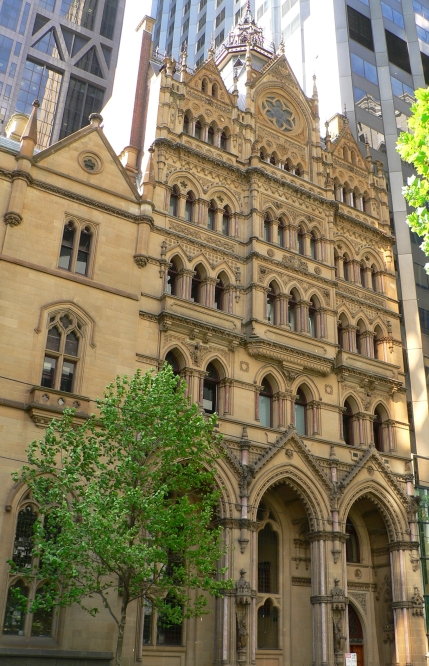
Former Stock Exchange, Collins Street, Melbourne; completed 1888.

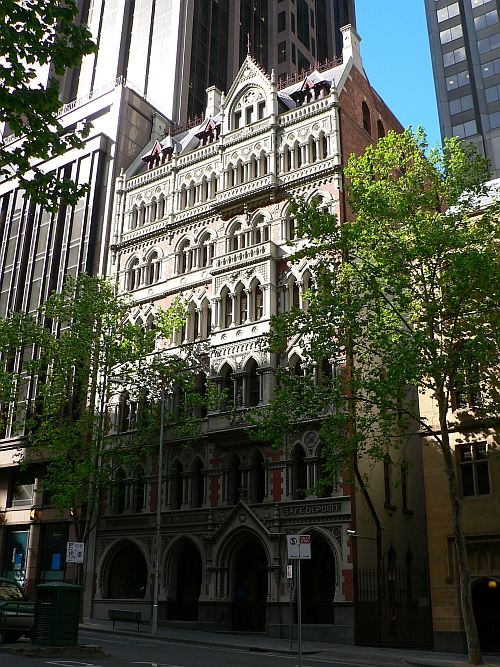
Former Safe Deposit Building, Collins Street, Melbourne; completed 1890

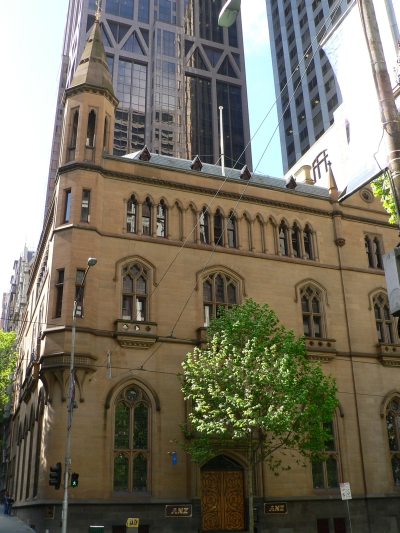
ANZ Bank, 390 Collins Street, Melbourne; completed 1883

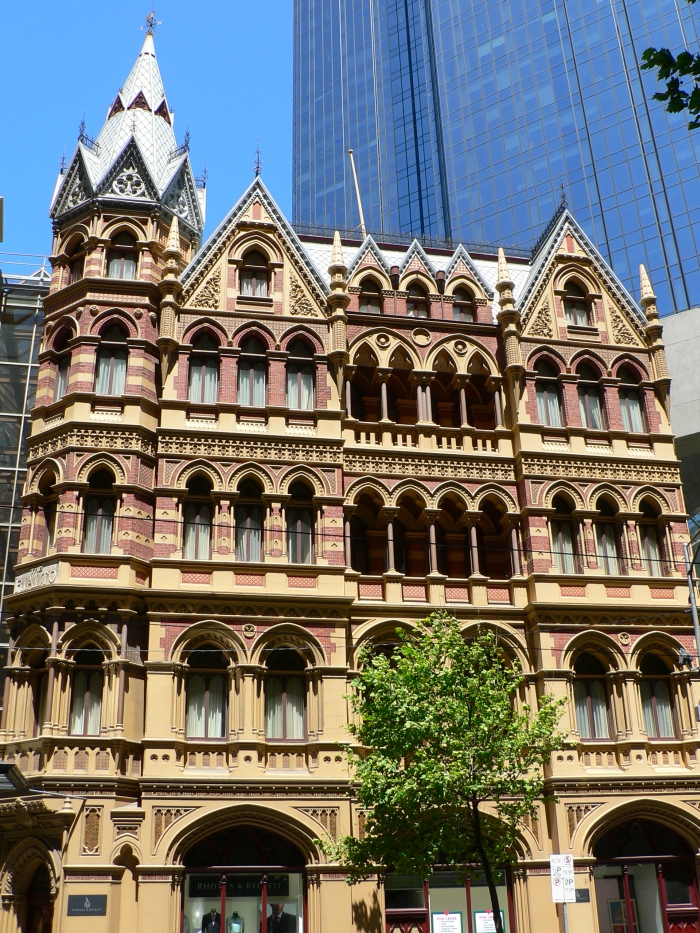
Old Rialto Building, Collins Street, Melbourne; completed 1888.

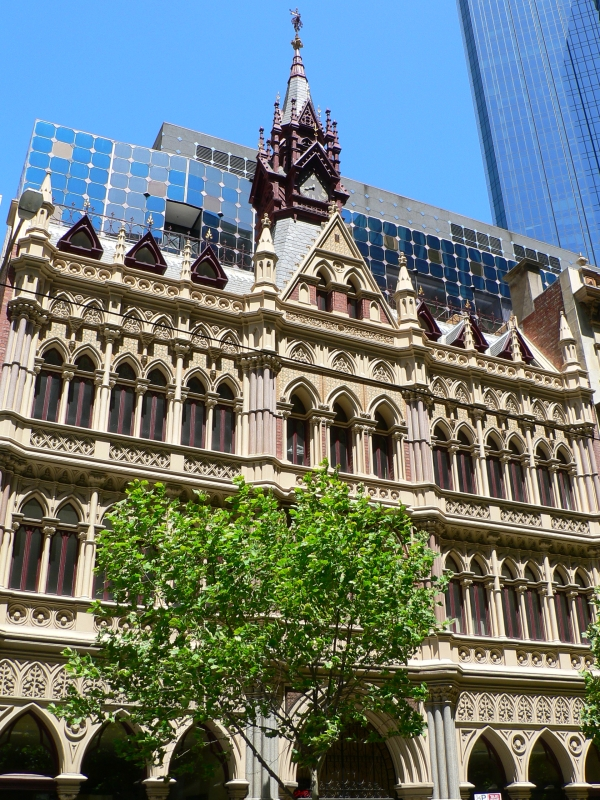
Olderfleet Buildings, Collins Street, Melbourne; completed 1888.

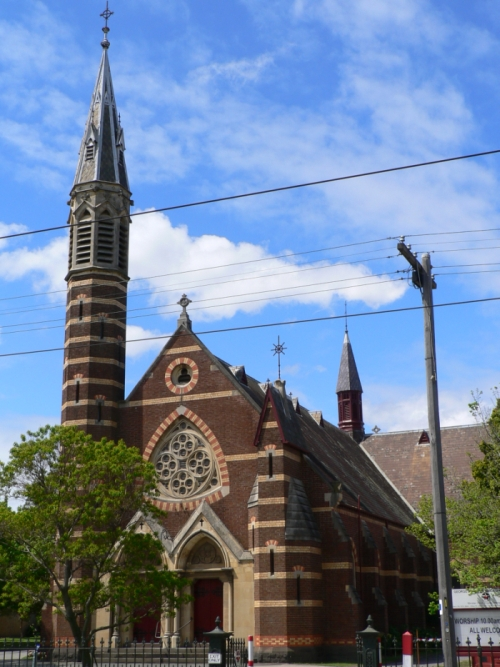
St George's Presbyterian Church, St Kilda East, Victoria; completed 1880.

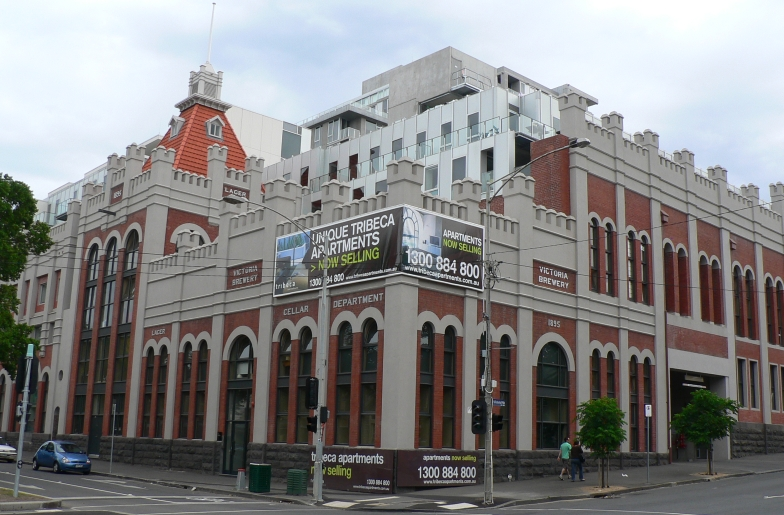
Victoria Brewery, East Melbourne, Victoria; completed 1882

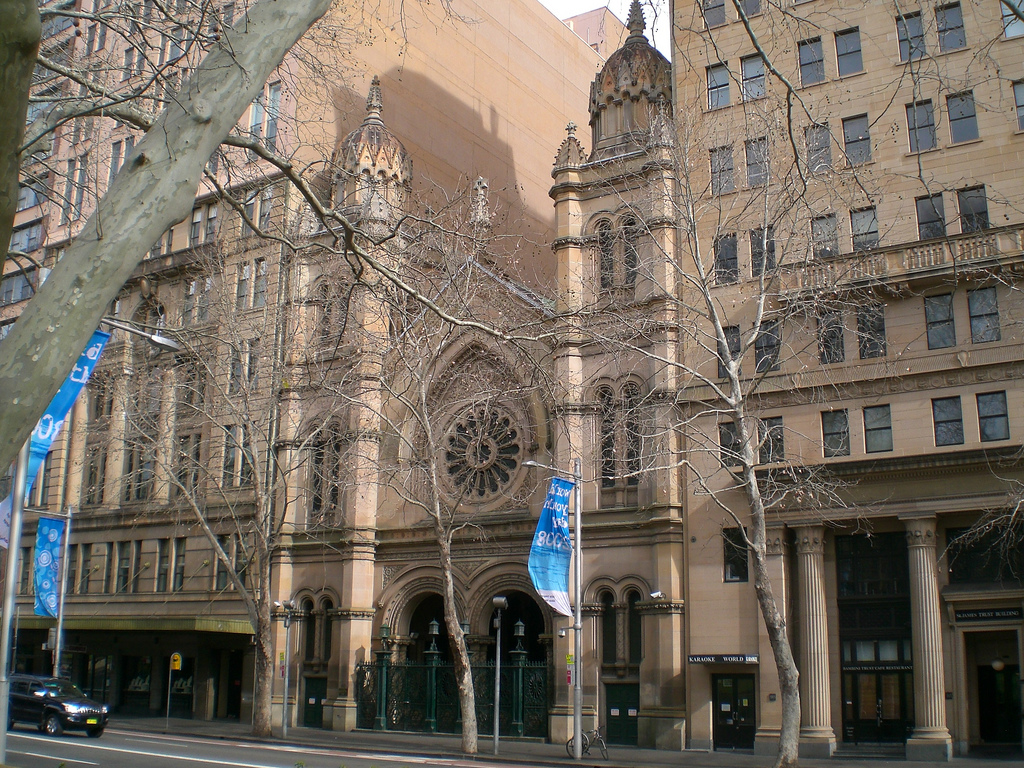
The Great Synagogue, Sydney; completed 1878

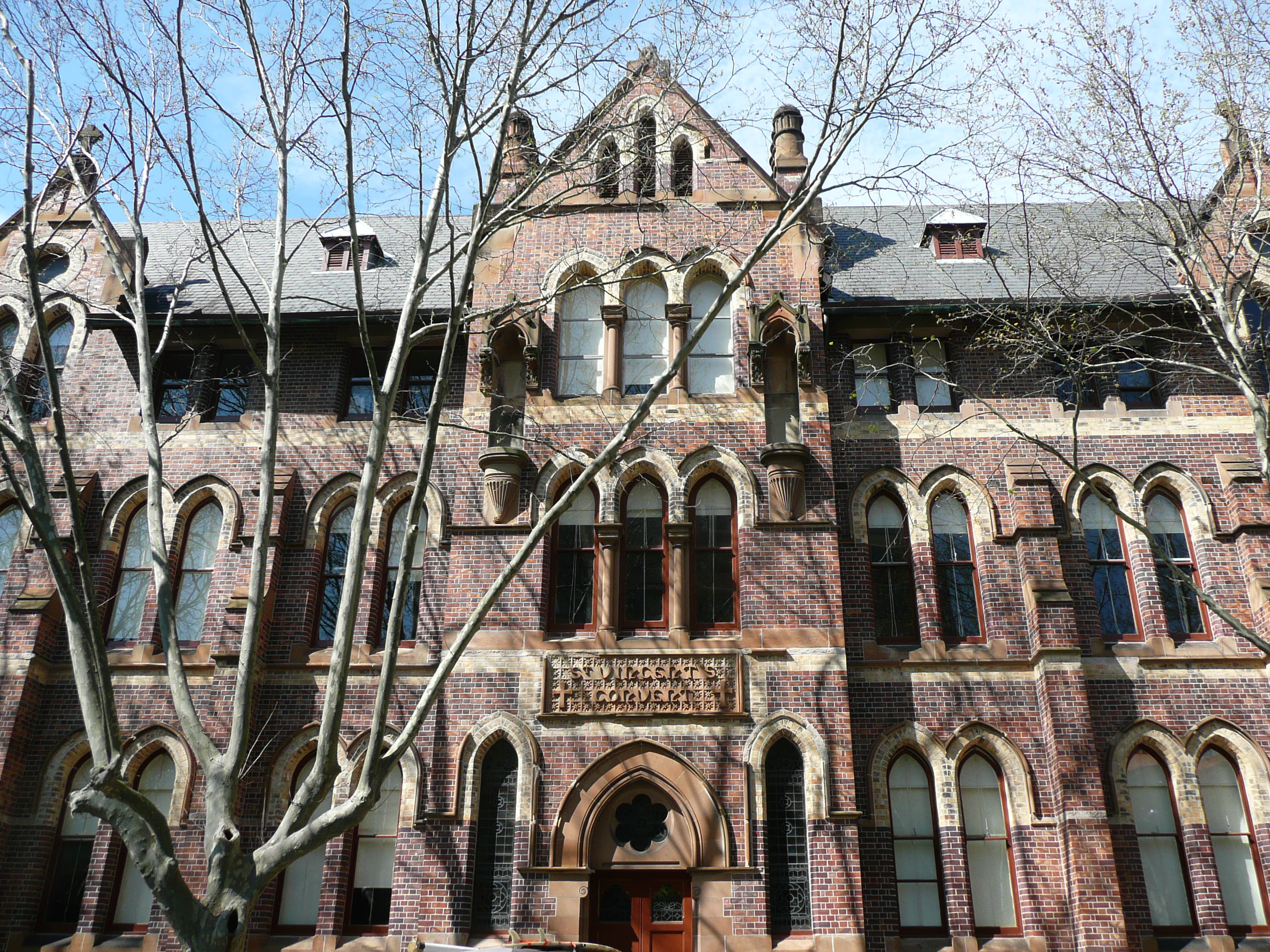
St Vincent's College, Potts Point. Completed 1886

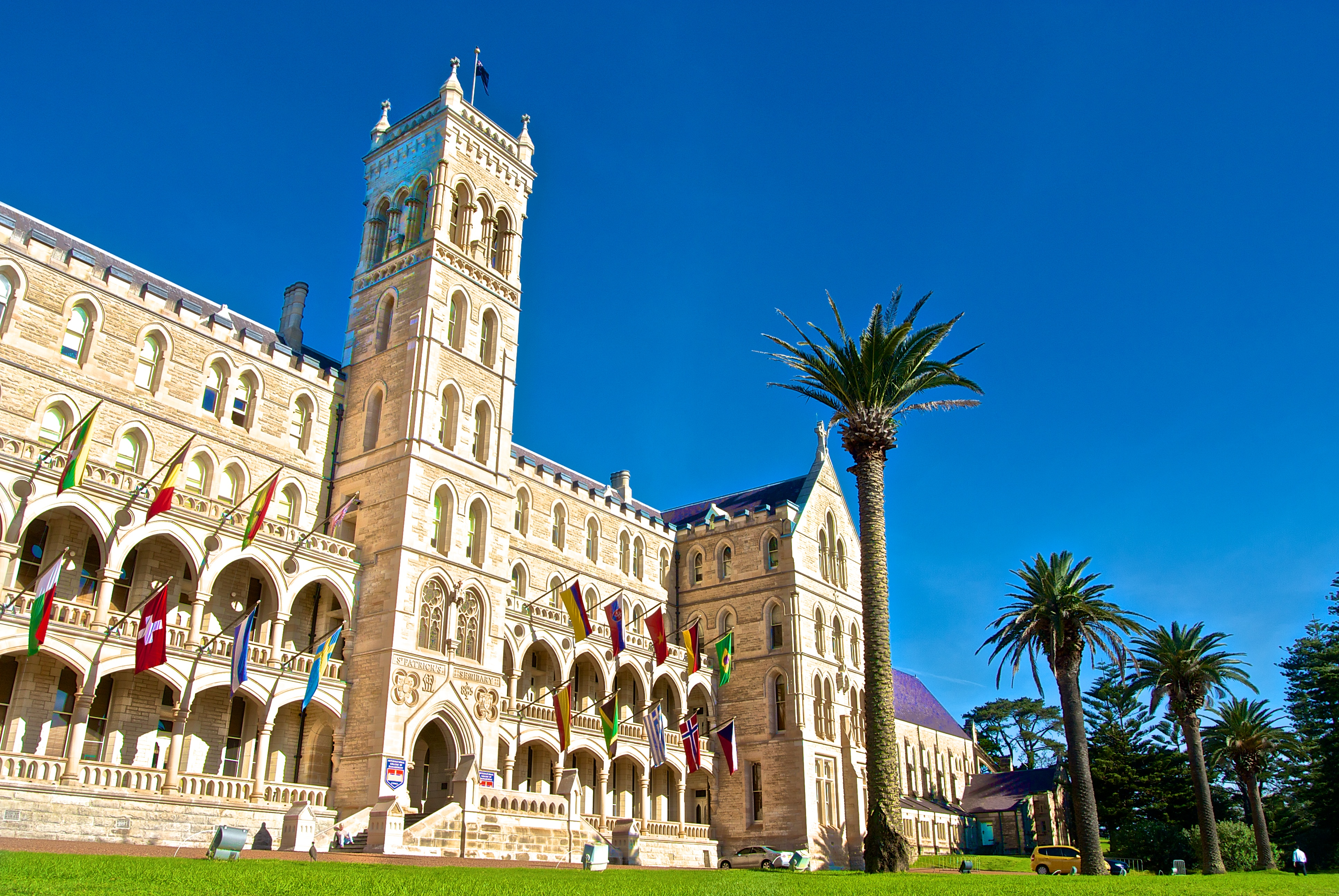
St Patrick's Seminary, Manly; completed 1885

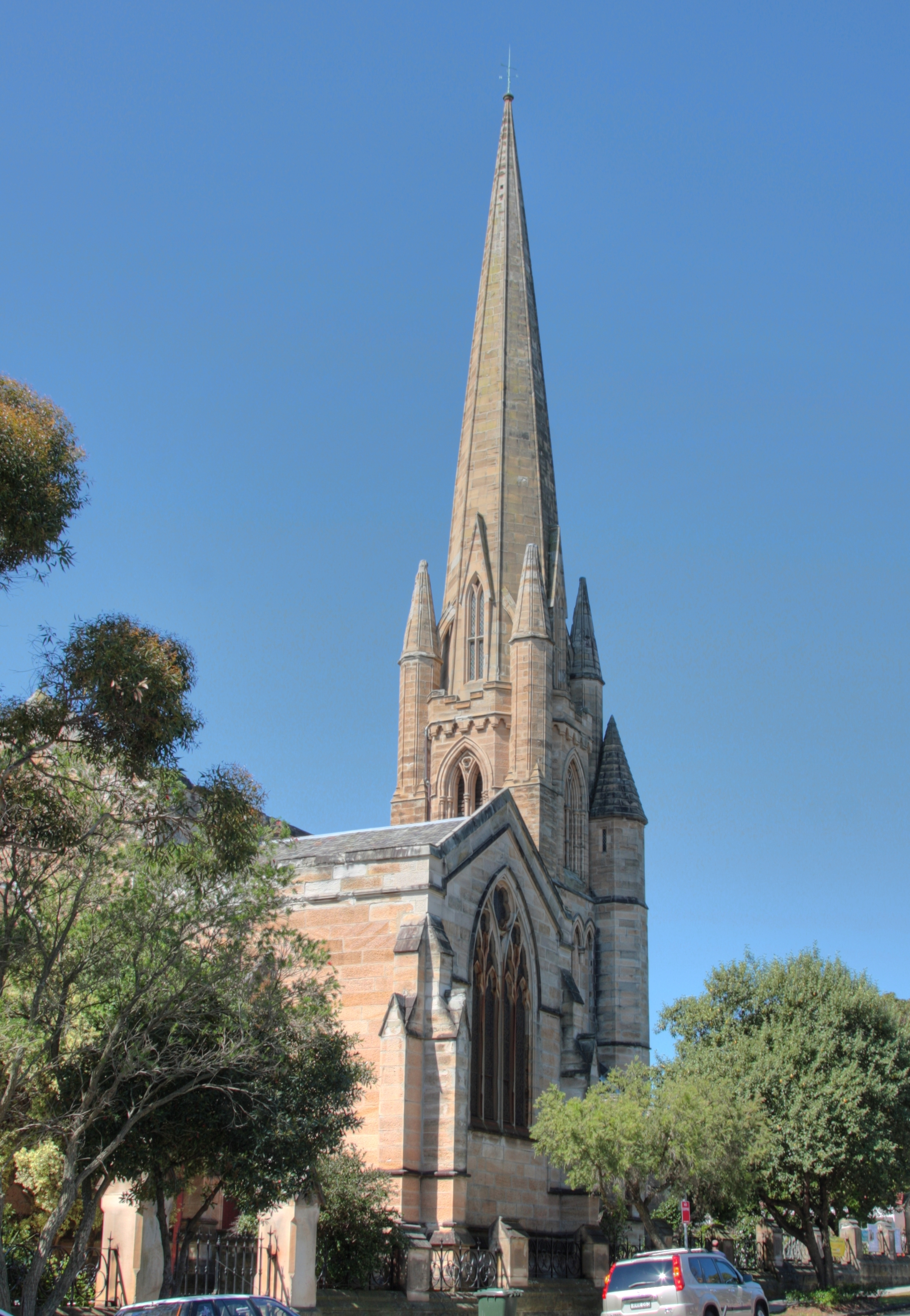
Hunter Baillie Memorial Presbyterian Church, Annandale. Completed 1889

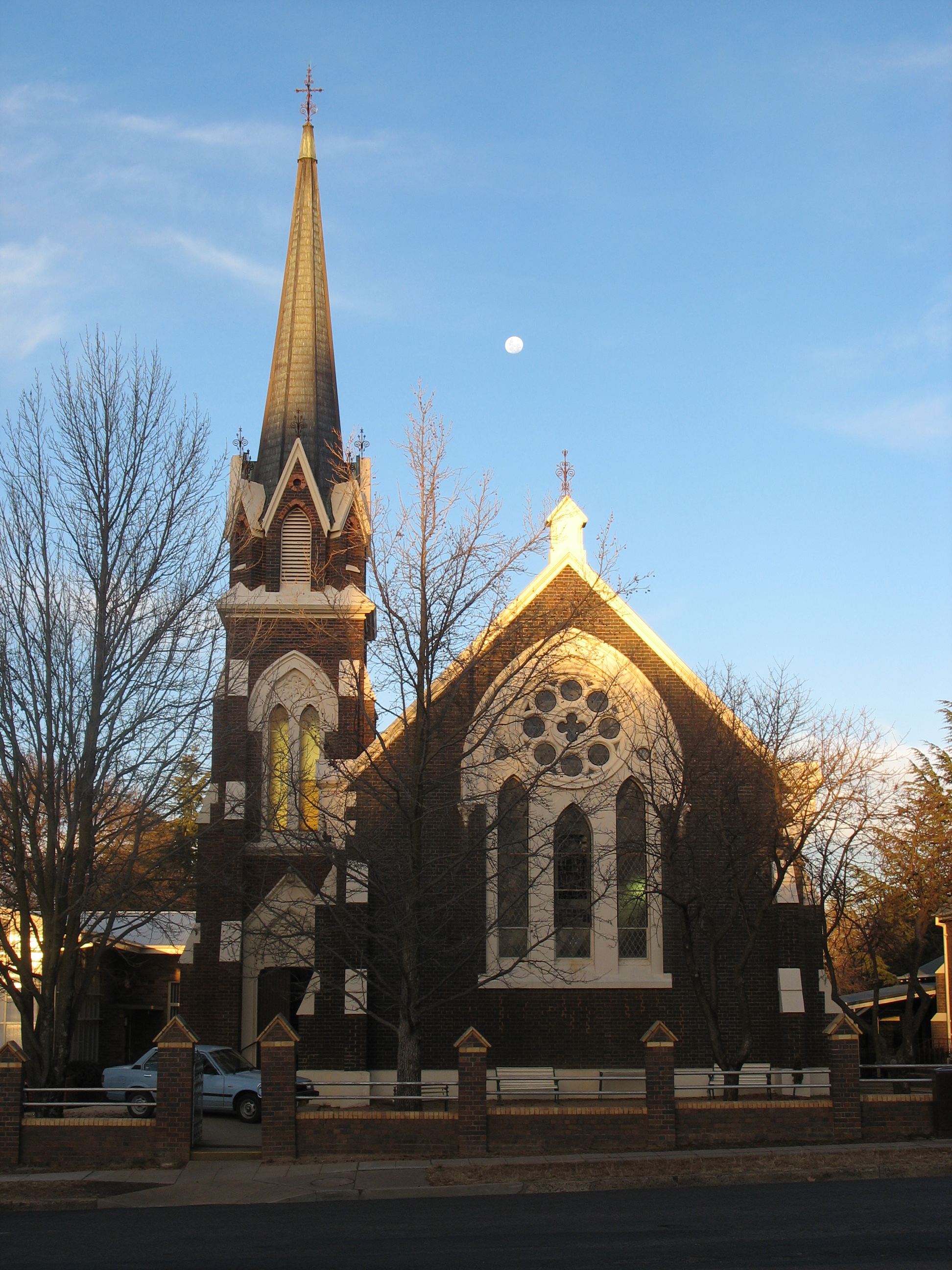
St Paul's Presbyterian Church; Armidale Completed 1882

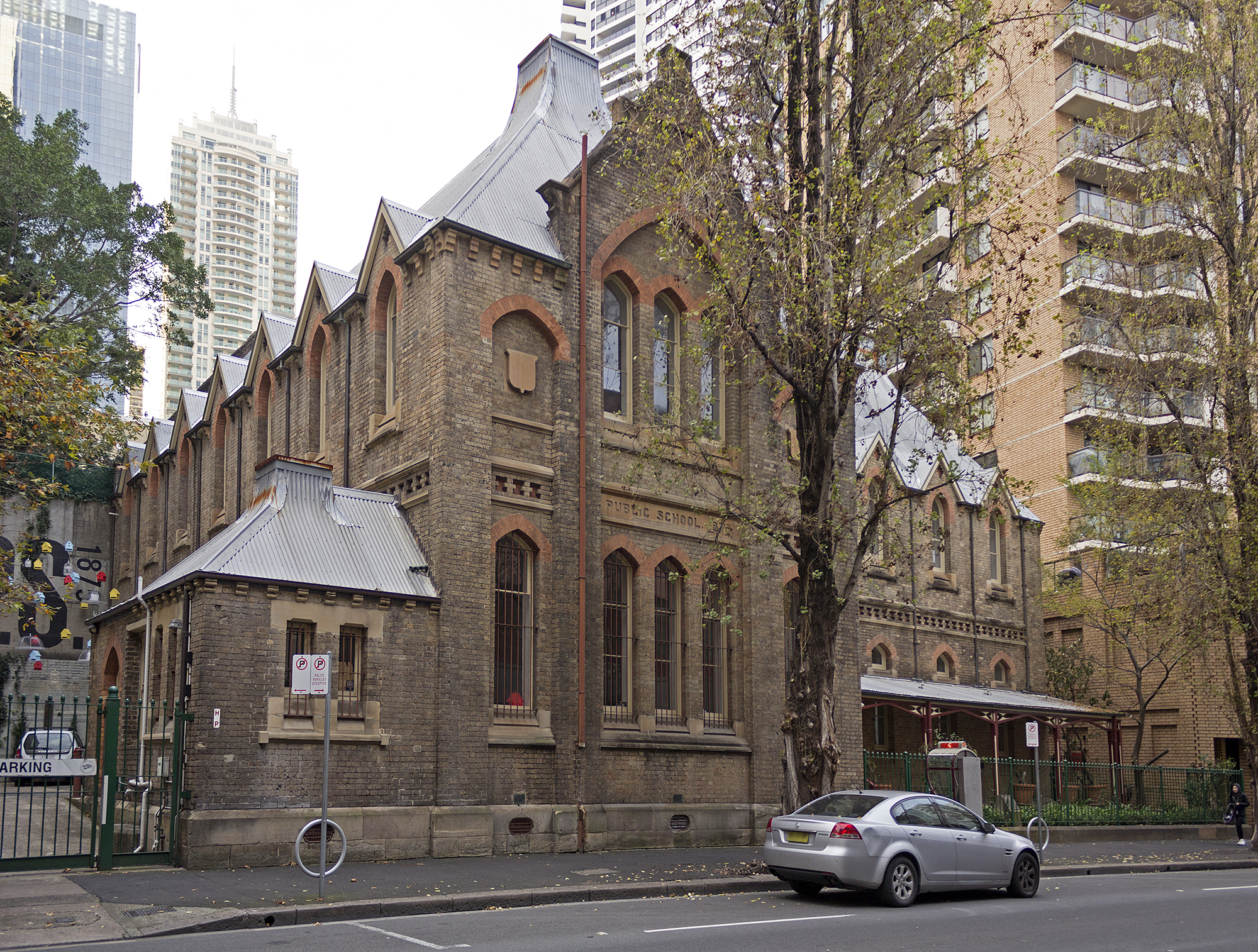
Former Sussex Street Public School, Sydney. Completed c.1878.

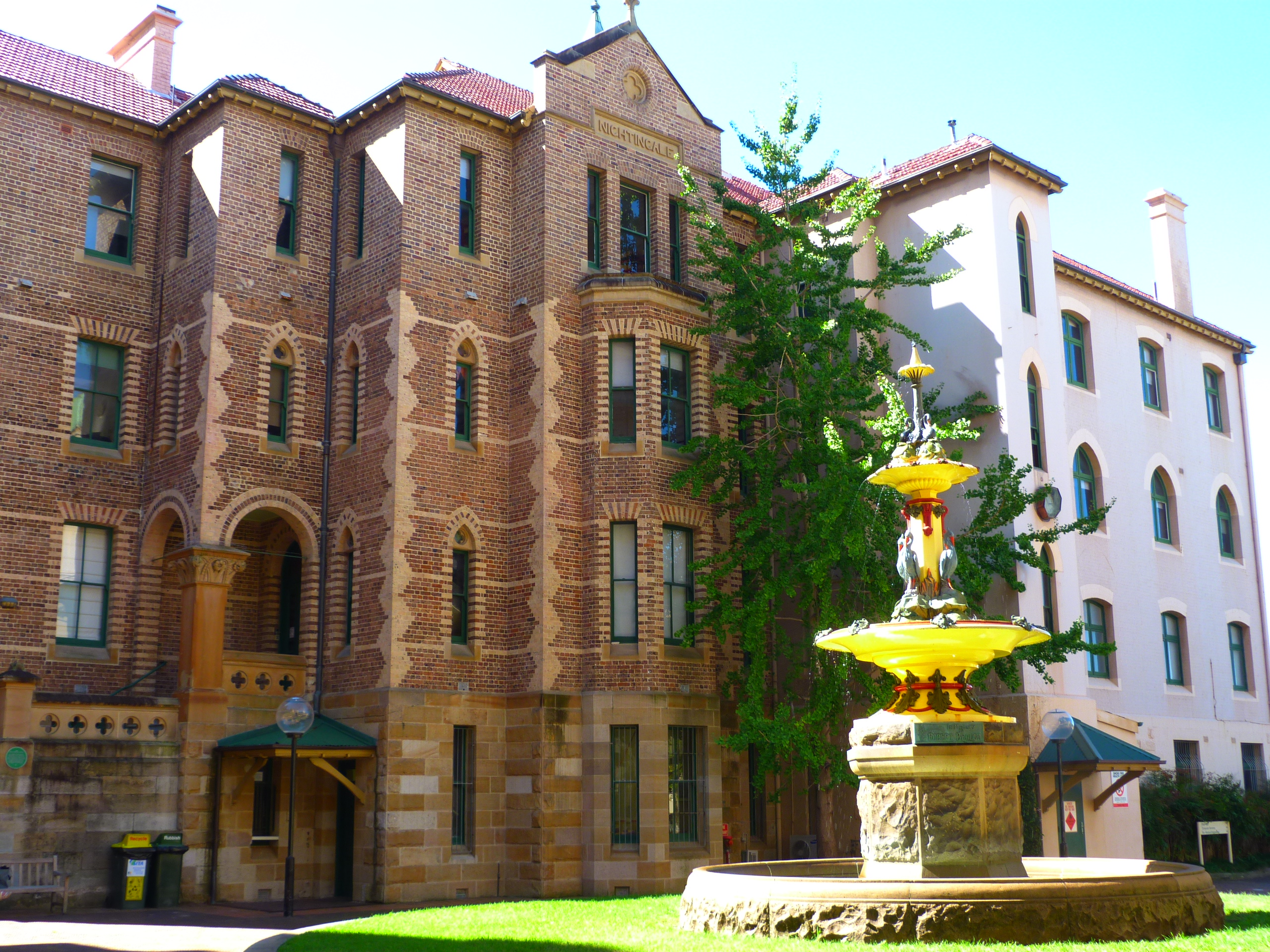
Nightingale Wing, Sydney Hospital. Completed 1869

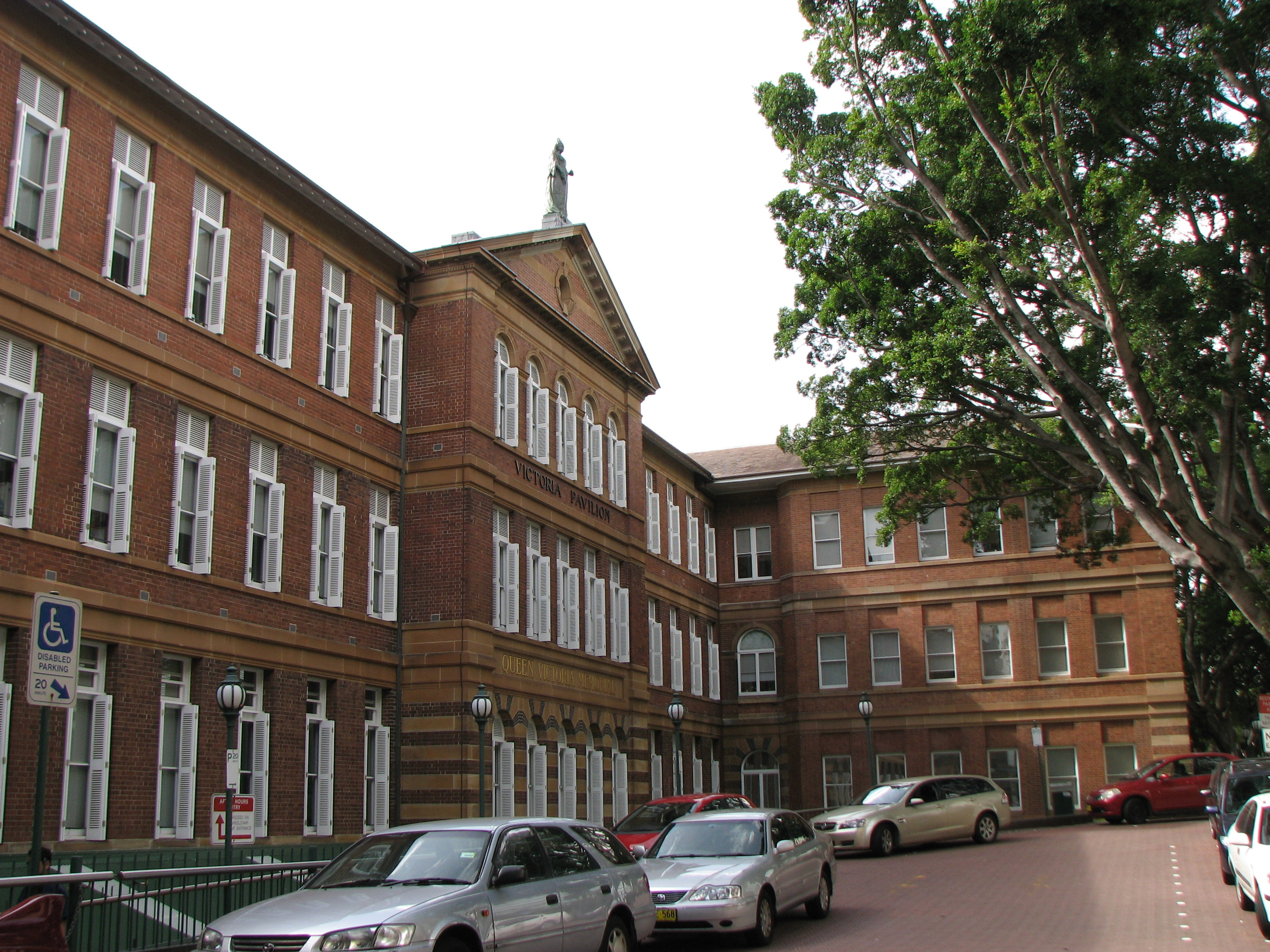
Royal Prince Alfred Hospital, Camperdown. Completed 1892

=== Victorian Tudor (Jacobethan) ===
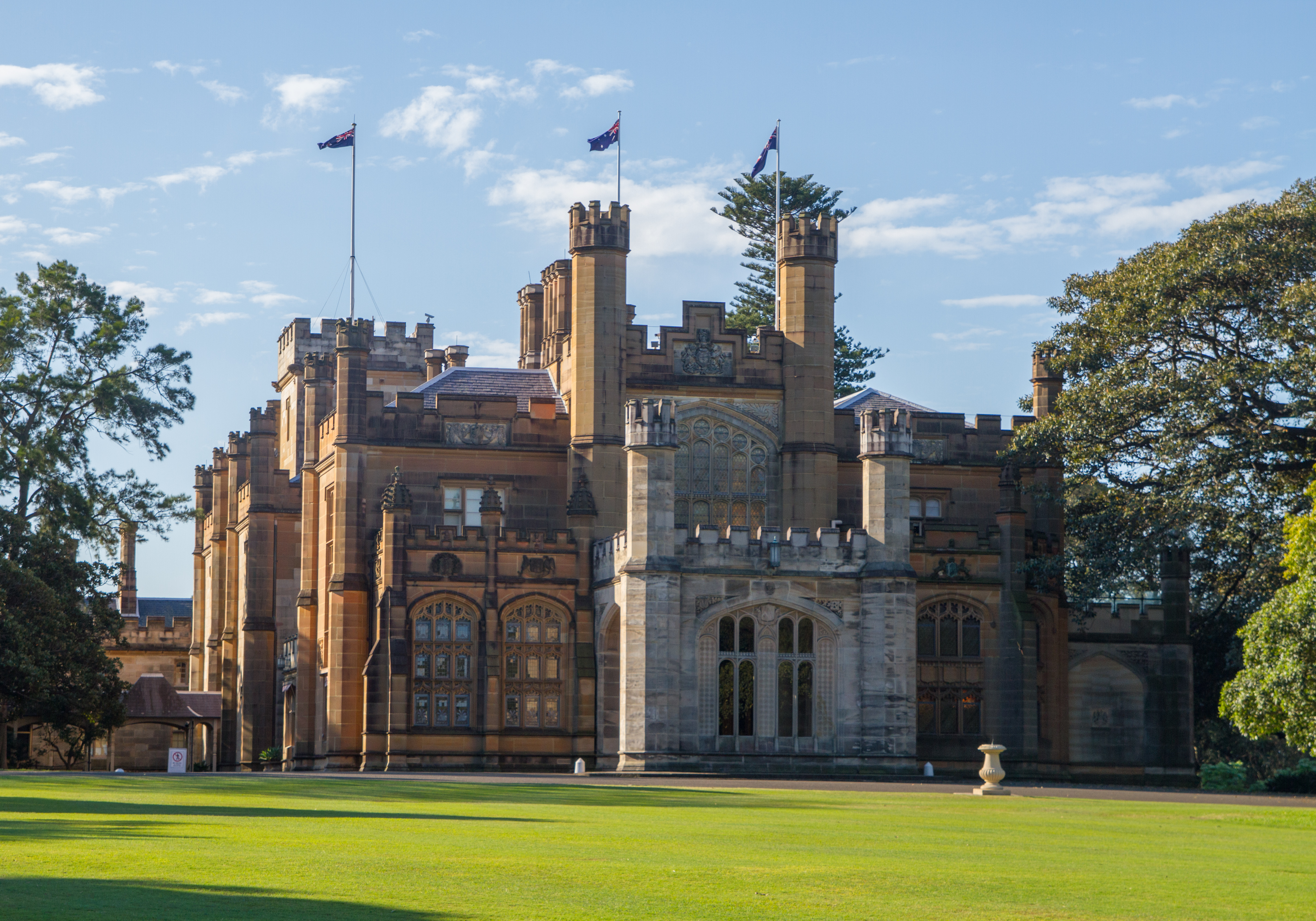
Government House, Sydney with Gothic Picturesque elements. Completed 1845

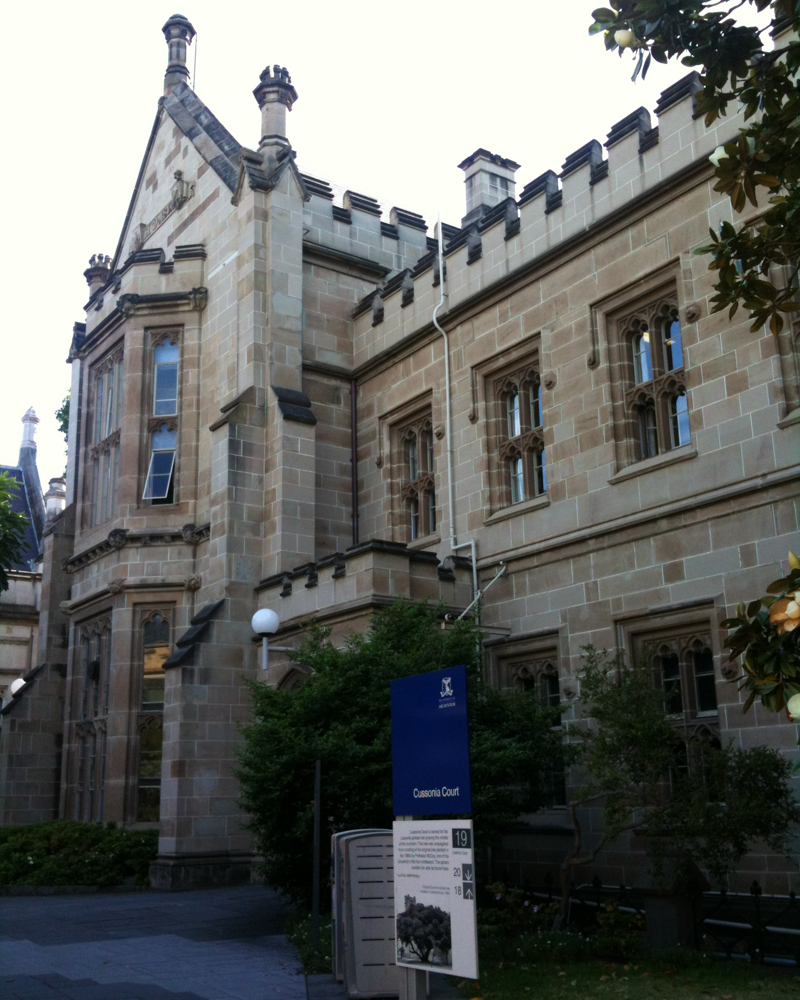
Old Arts Building, University of Melbourne; completed 1857

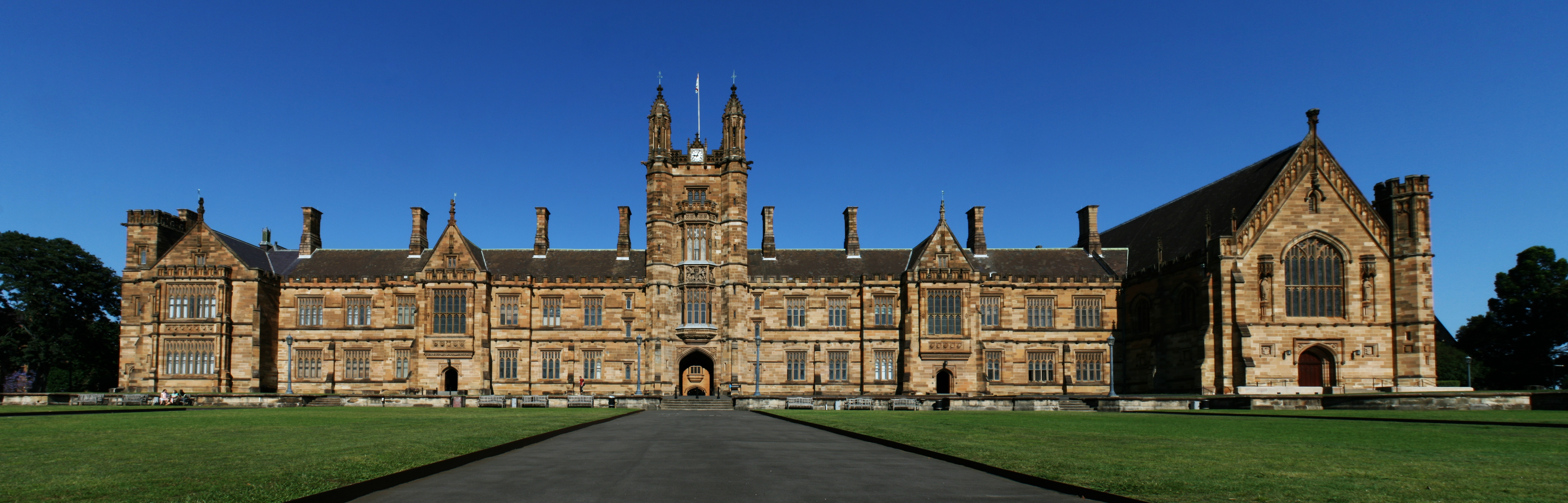
Main Quadrangle, University of Sydney; completed 1862

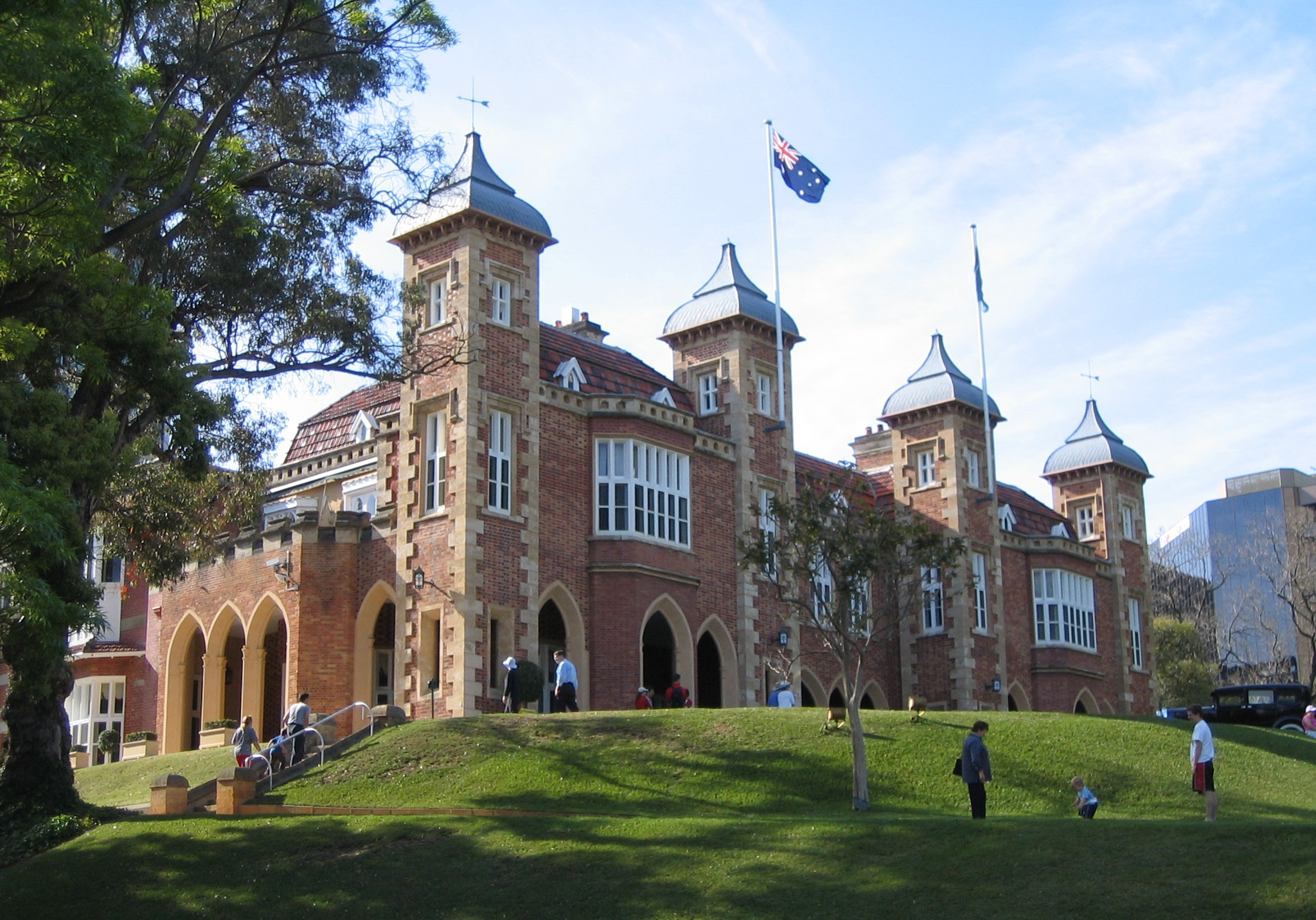
Government House, Perth; completed in 1864

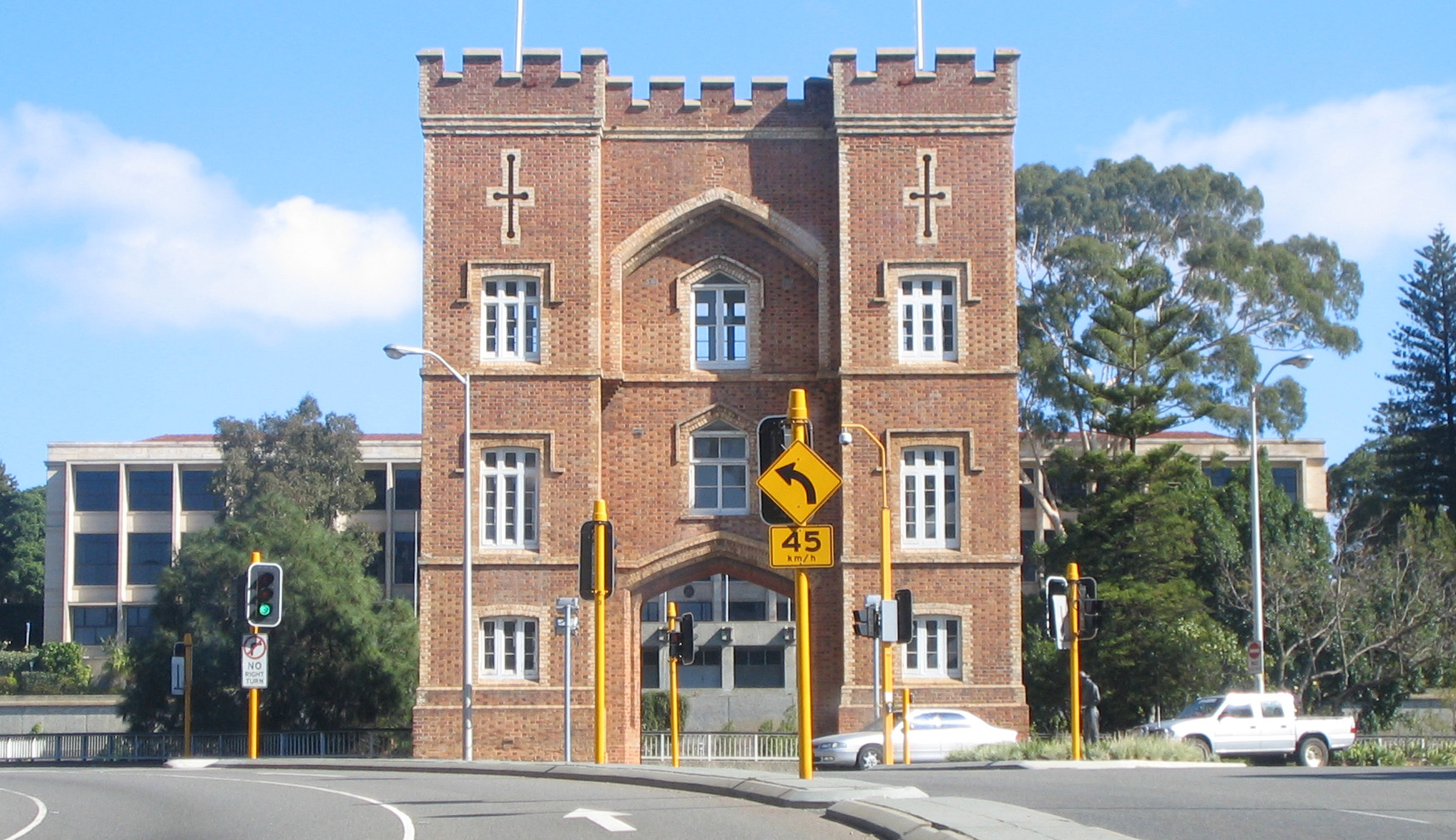
Barracks Arch, Perth; completed in 1863

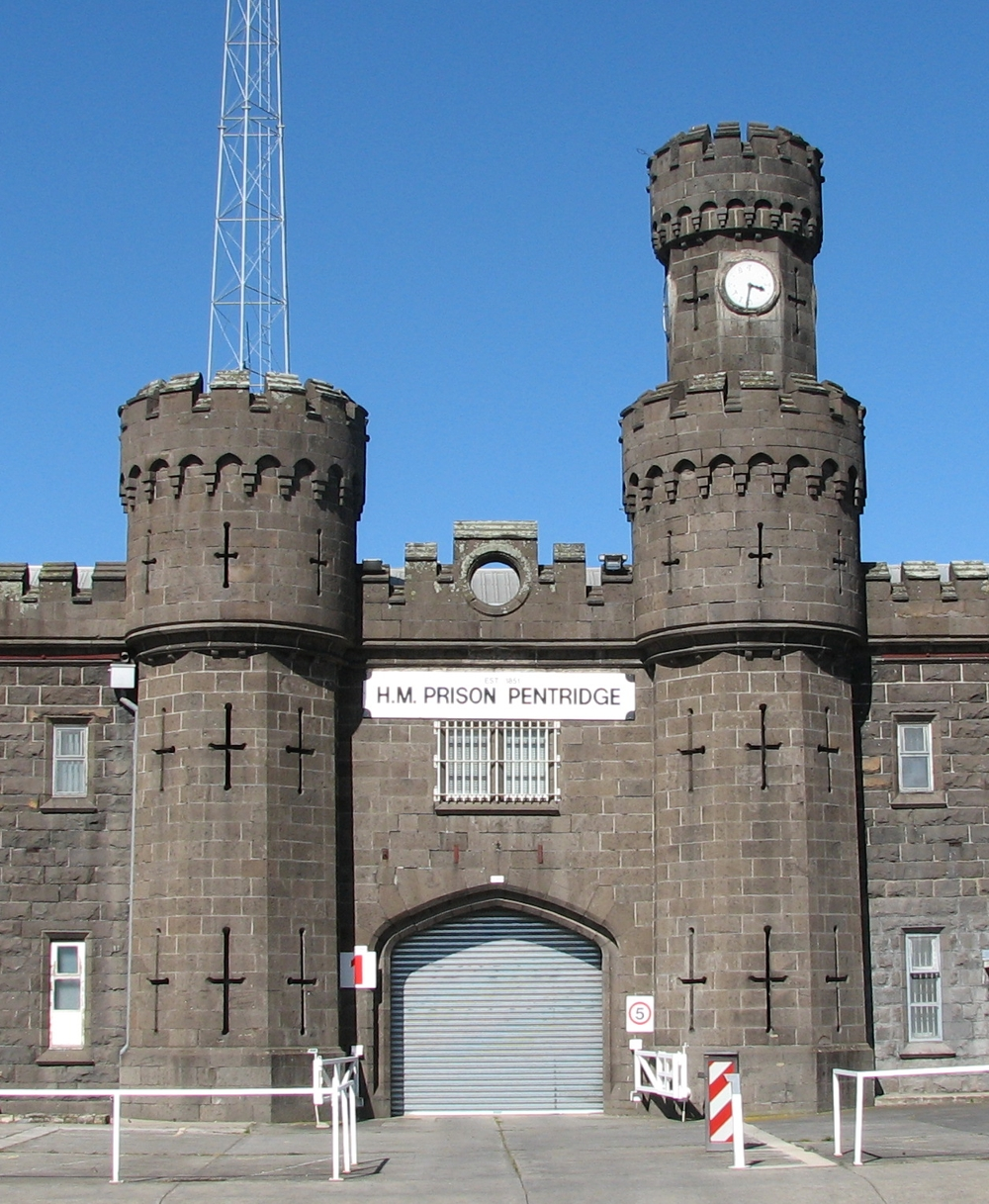
HM Prison Pentridge, Coburg, Victoria; completed in 1864

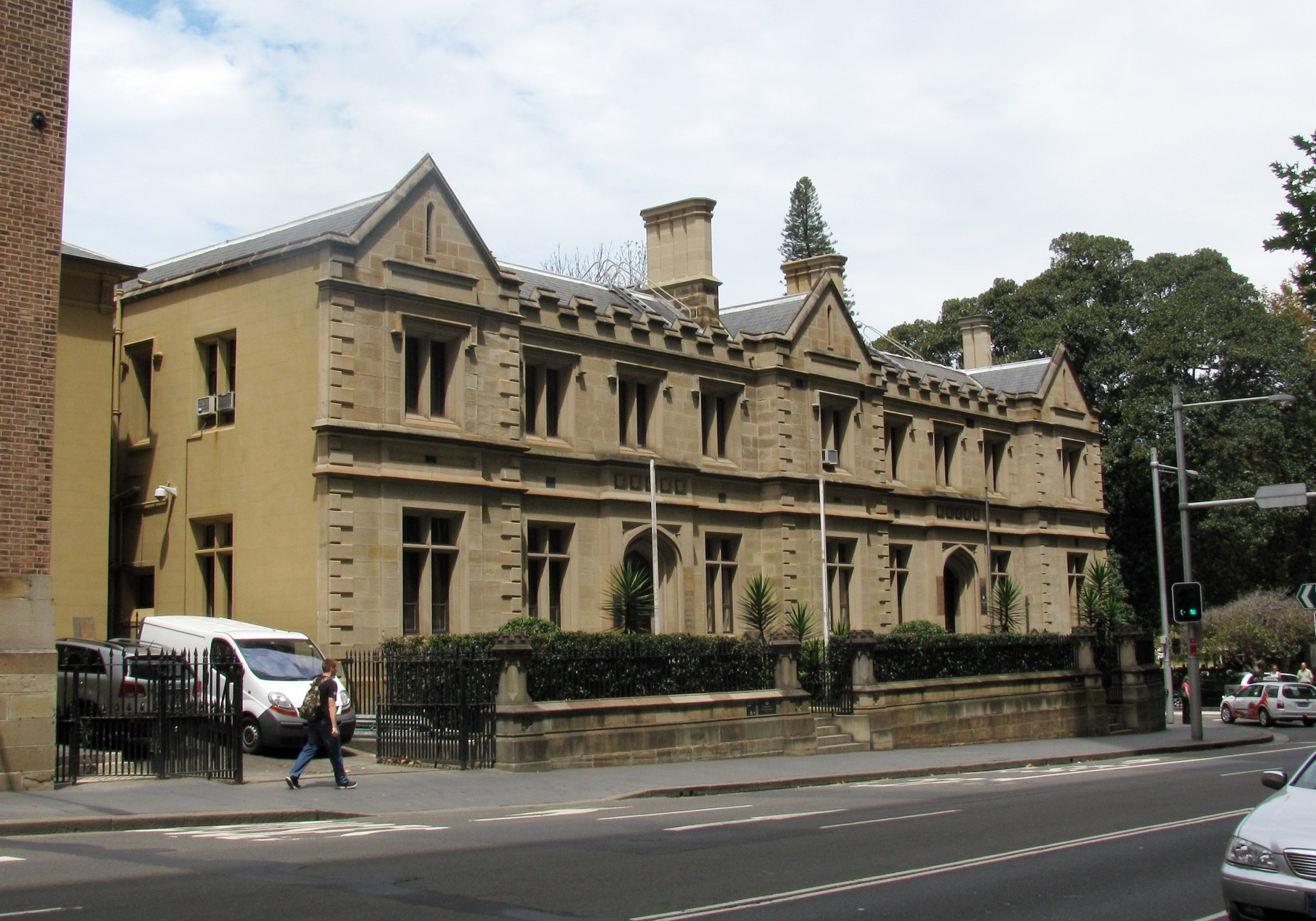
Old Registry Wing (Supreme Court of New South Wales), Sydney. Completed 1862

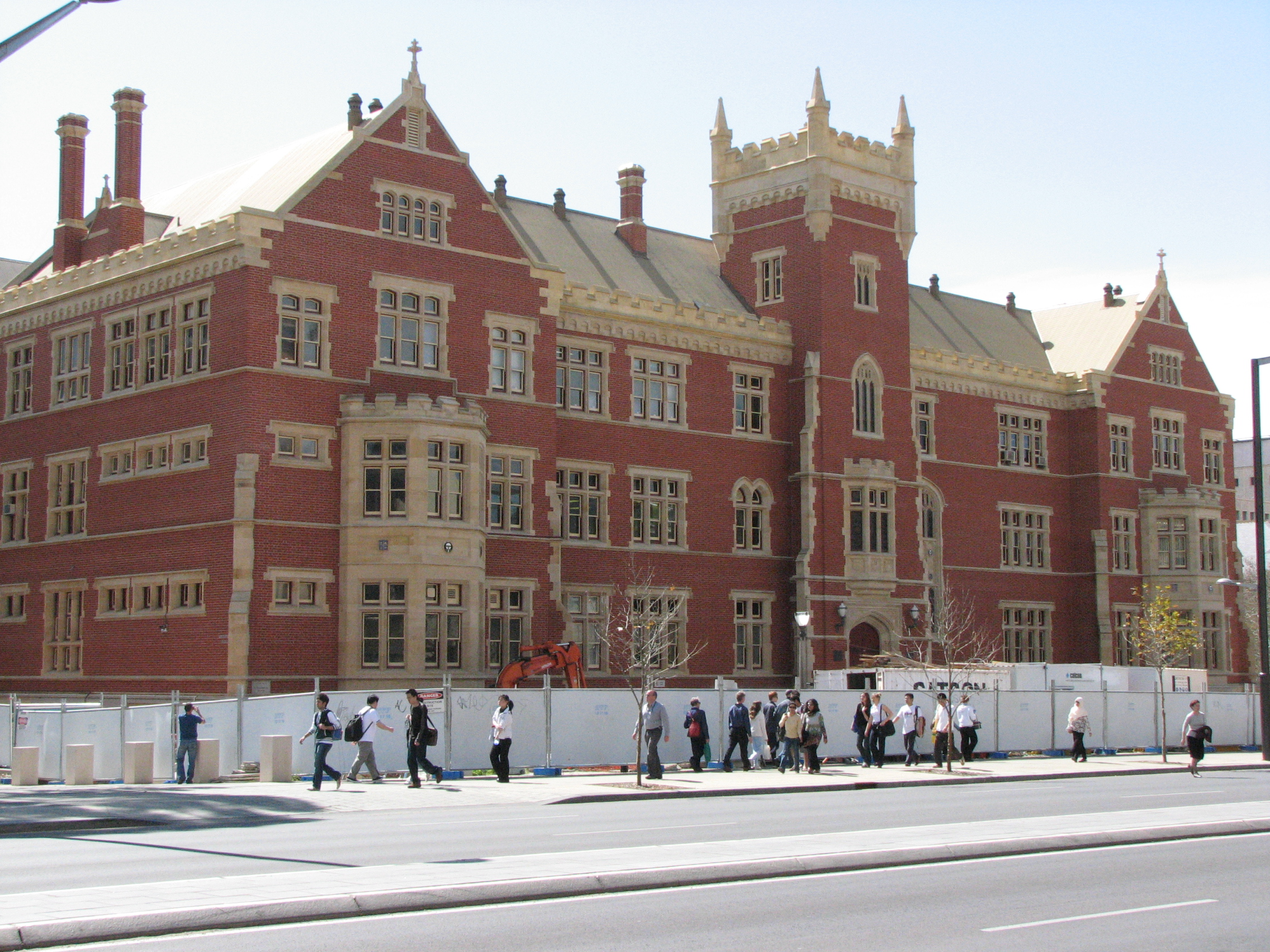
North Terrace, University of Adelaide

=== Victorian Rustic Gothic ===
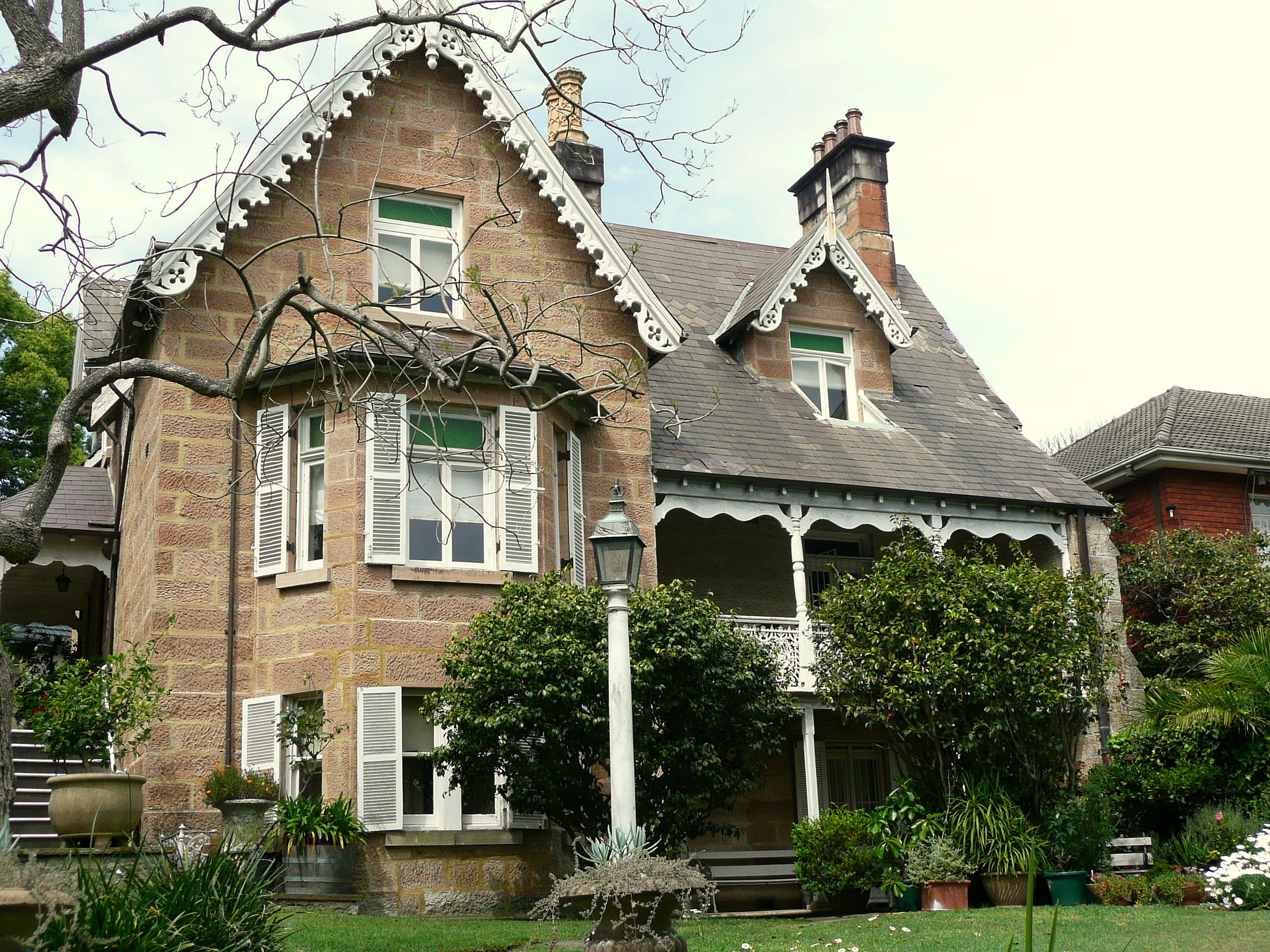
St Mark's Rectory, Darling Point

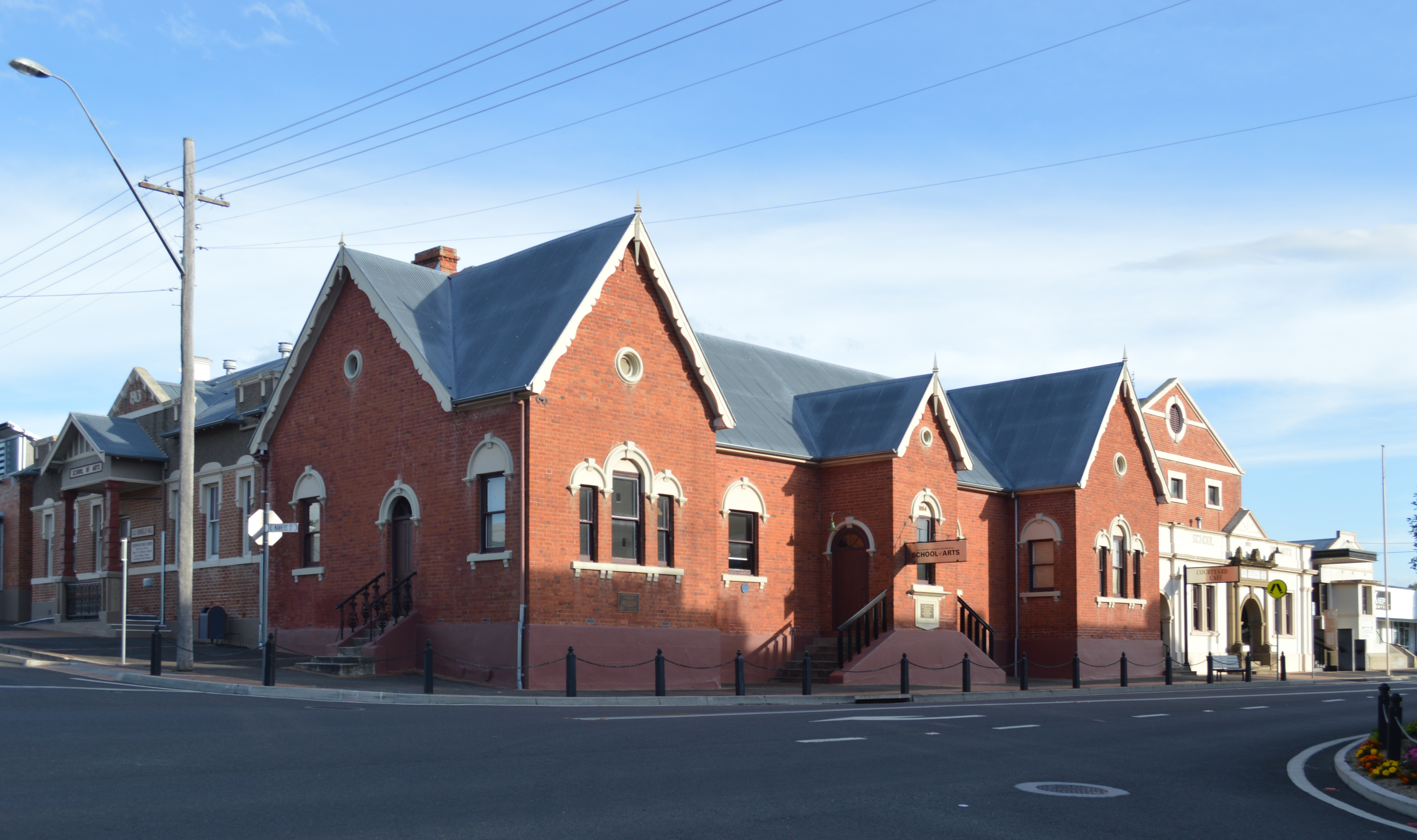
Tenterfield School of Arts

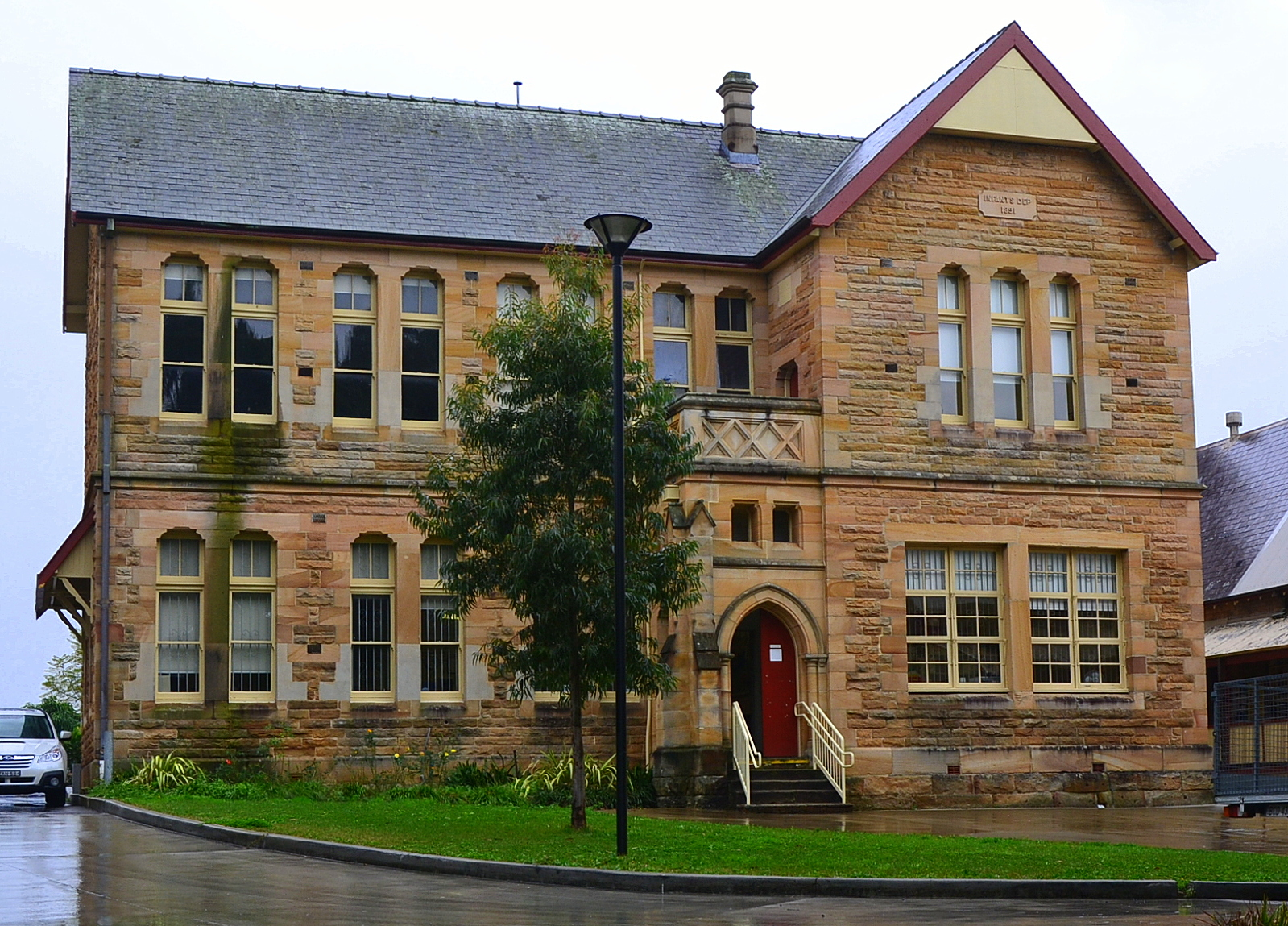
Ryde Public School; Ryde

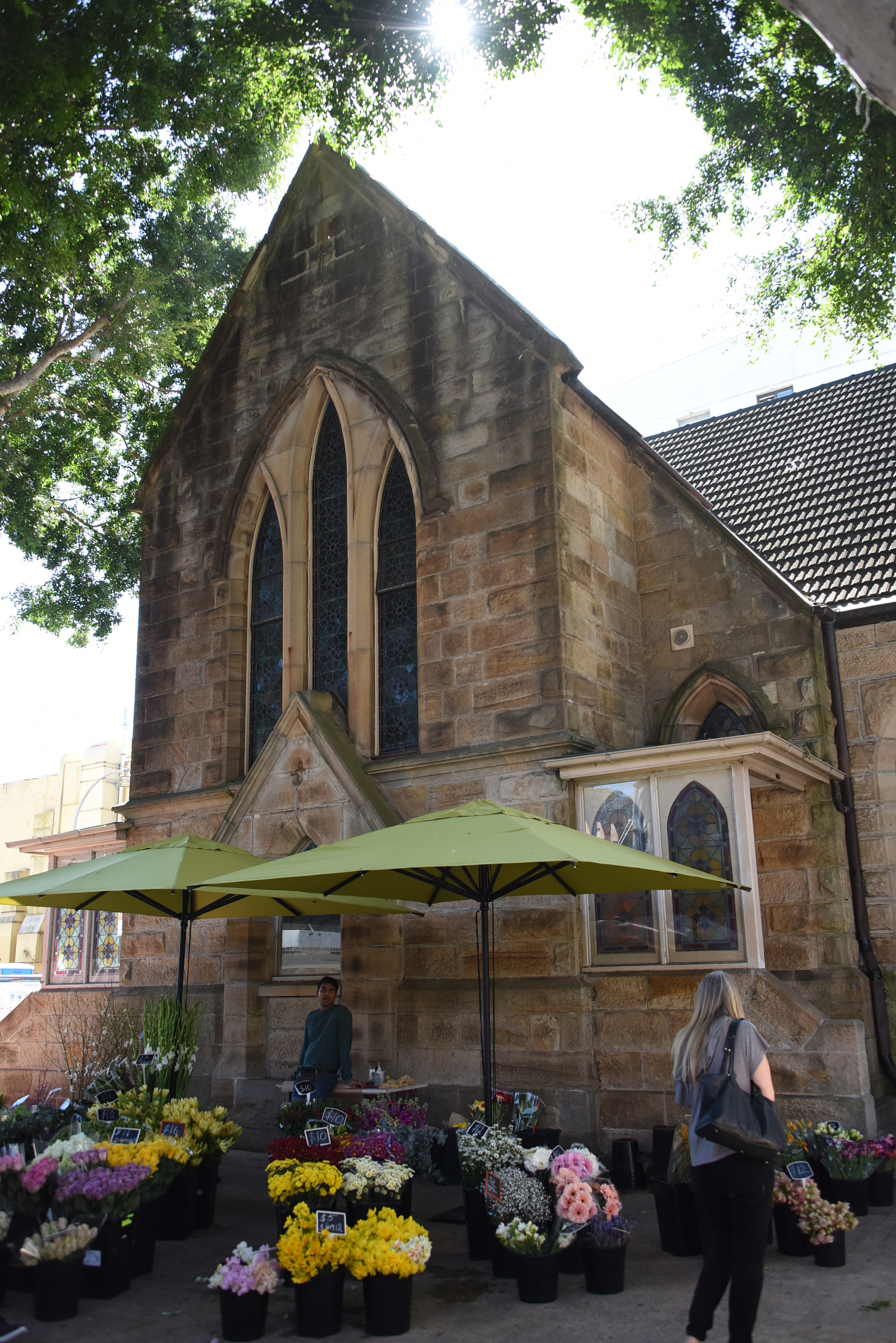
Manly Congregational Church, Manly

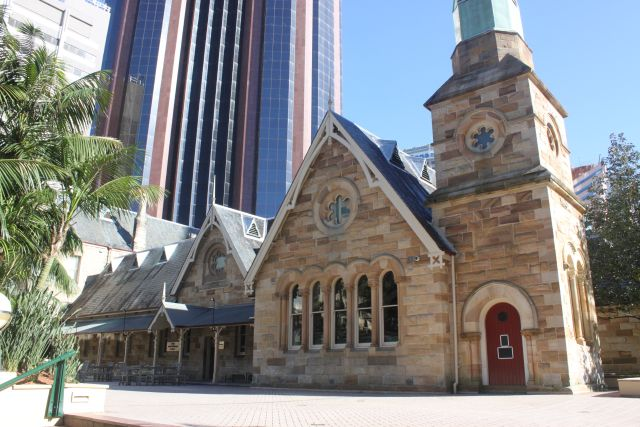
Former North Sydney Technical High School, North Sydney

=== Victorian Carpenter Gothic ===
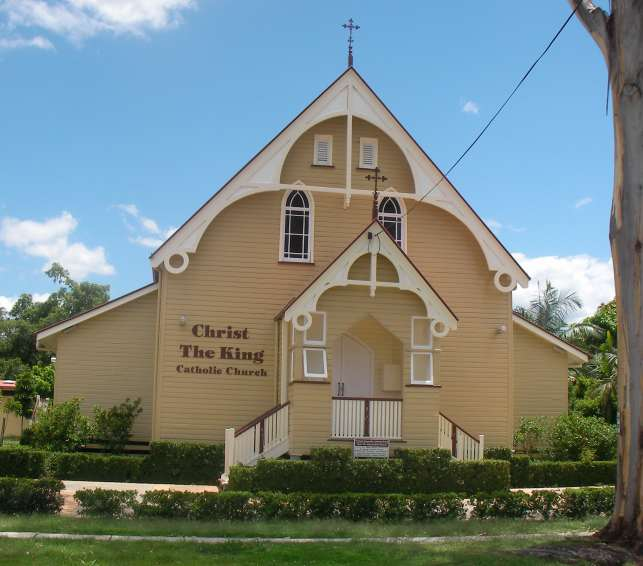
Christ the King Church, Graceville

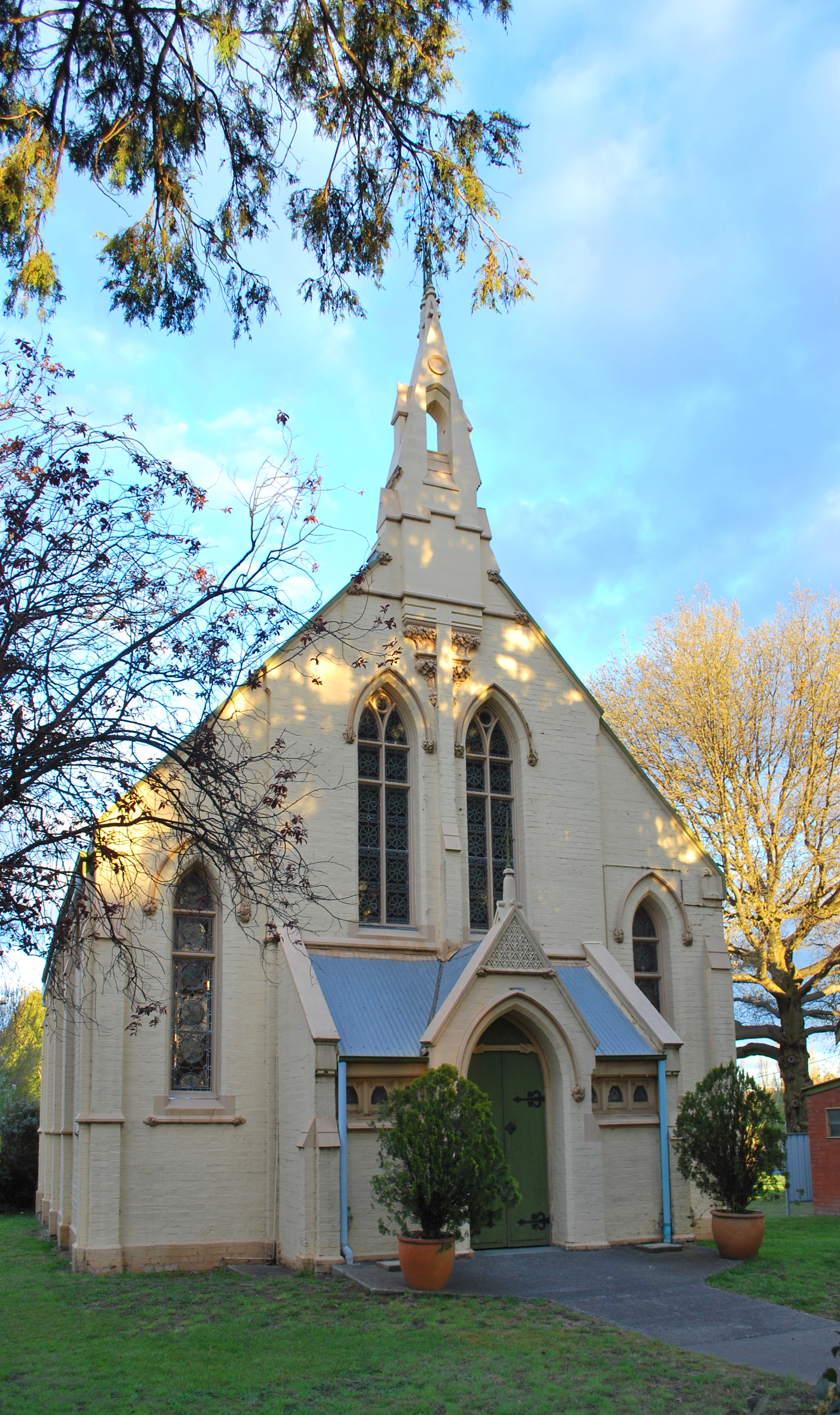
Blayney Uniting Church; Blayney.

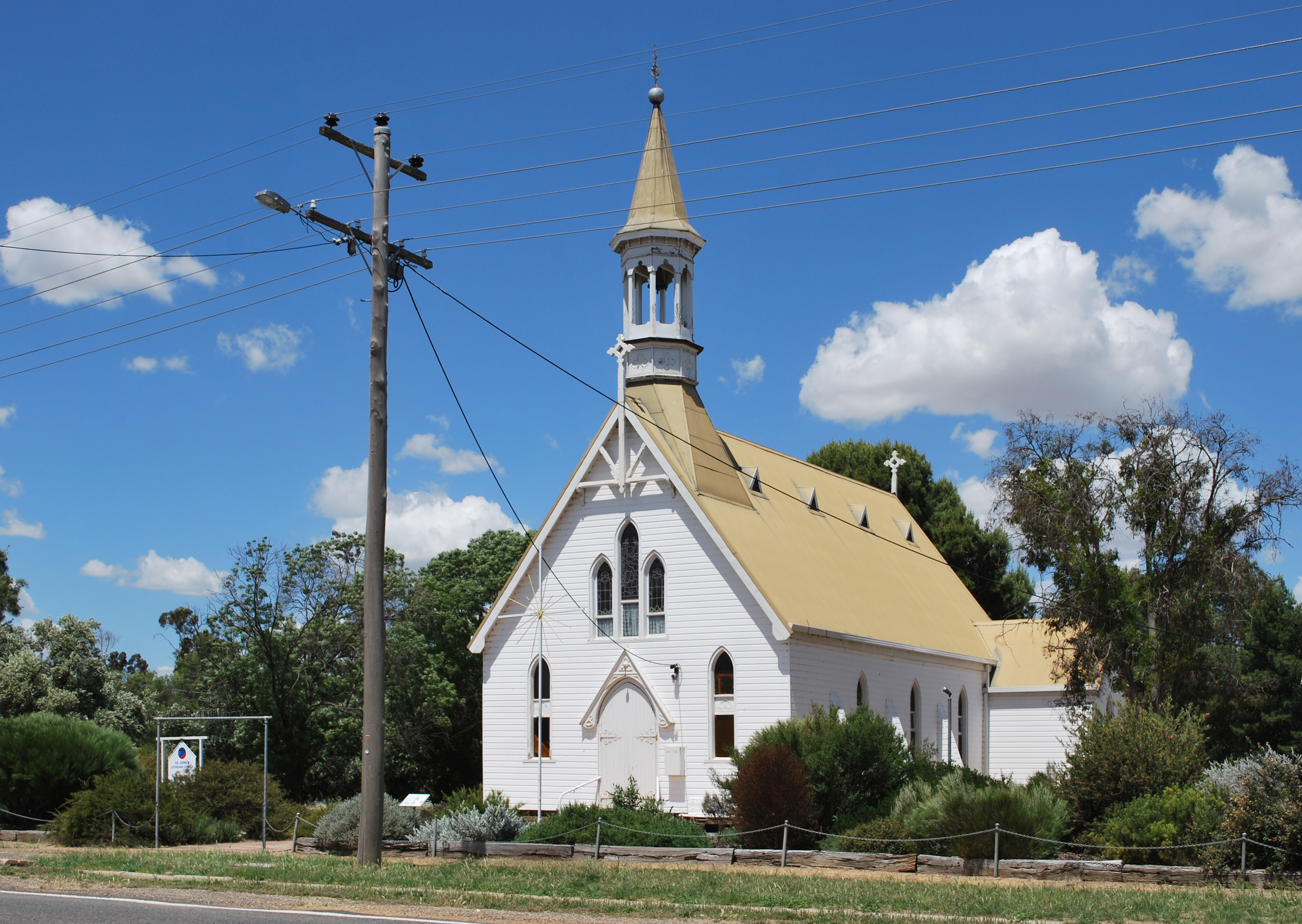
St John's Lutheran Church, Minyip

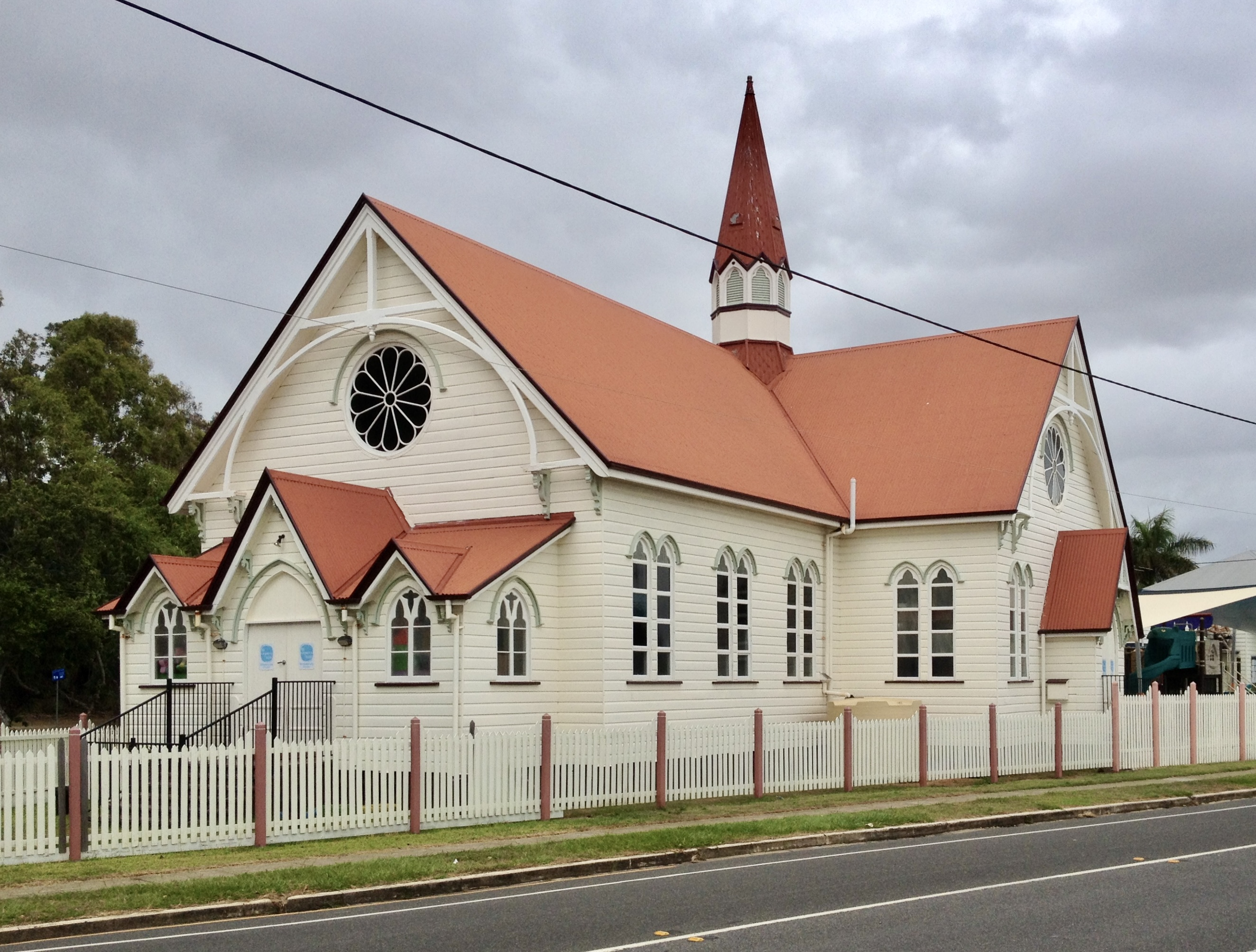
Sandgate Baptist Church

== Edwardian period (c. 1890s–1910) ==
Edwardian architecture is generally less ornate than high or late Victorian architecture, apart from a subset - used for major buildings - known as Edwardian Baroque architecture.

=== Edwardian Baroque ===
Notable examples include the Lands Administration Building in Brisbane, the Queen Victoria Hospital, Melbourne (main pavilion, now Queen Victoria Women's Centre), the Commonwealth Offices, Treasury Place, Melbourne, the Department of Education building in Sydney (1912) and the General Post Office, Hobart.

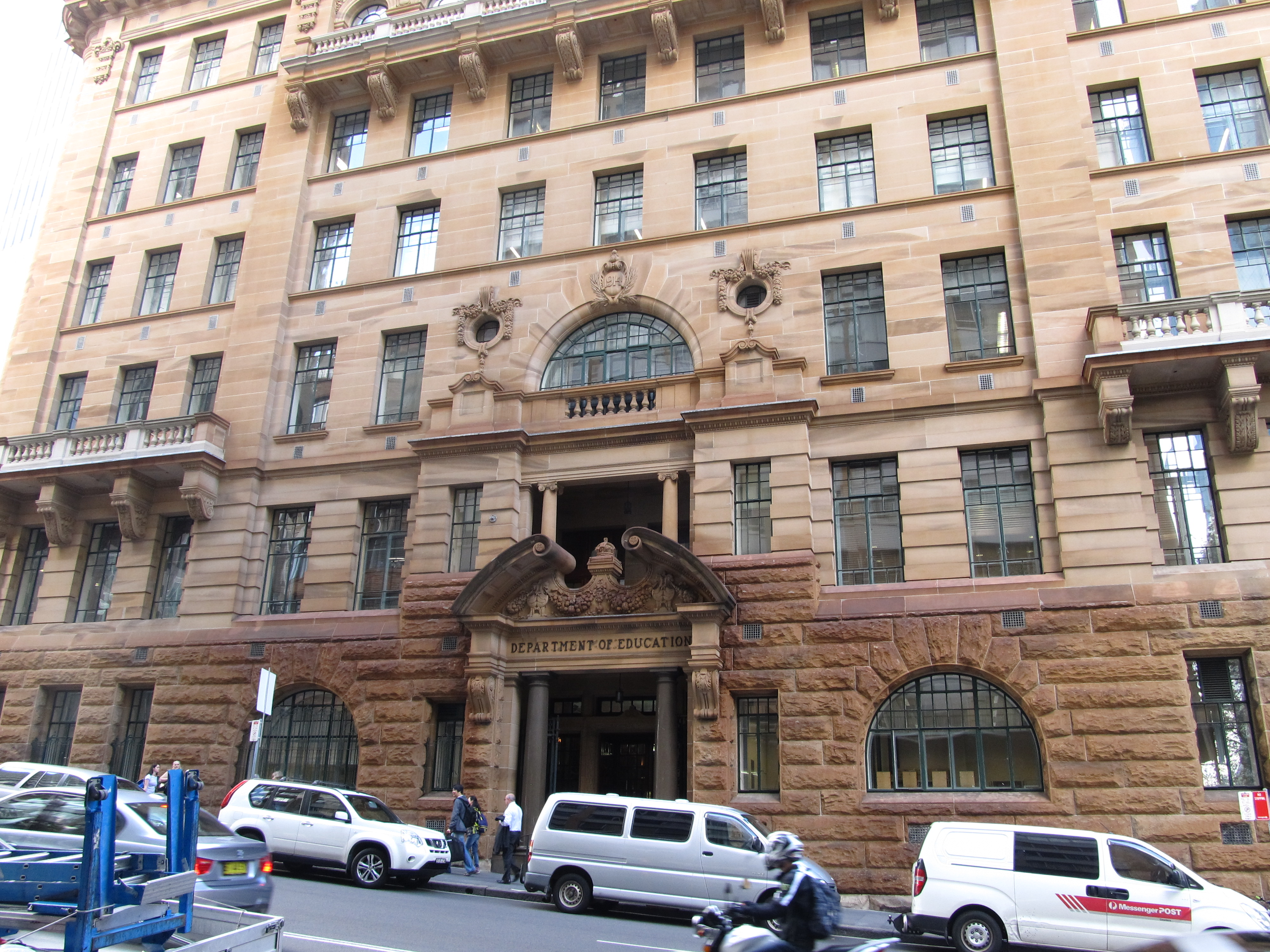
Department of Education building, Sydney.

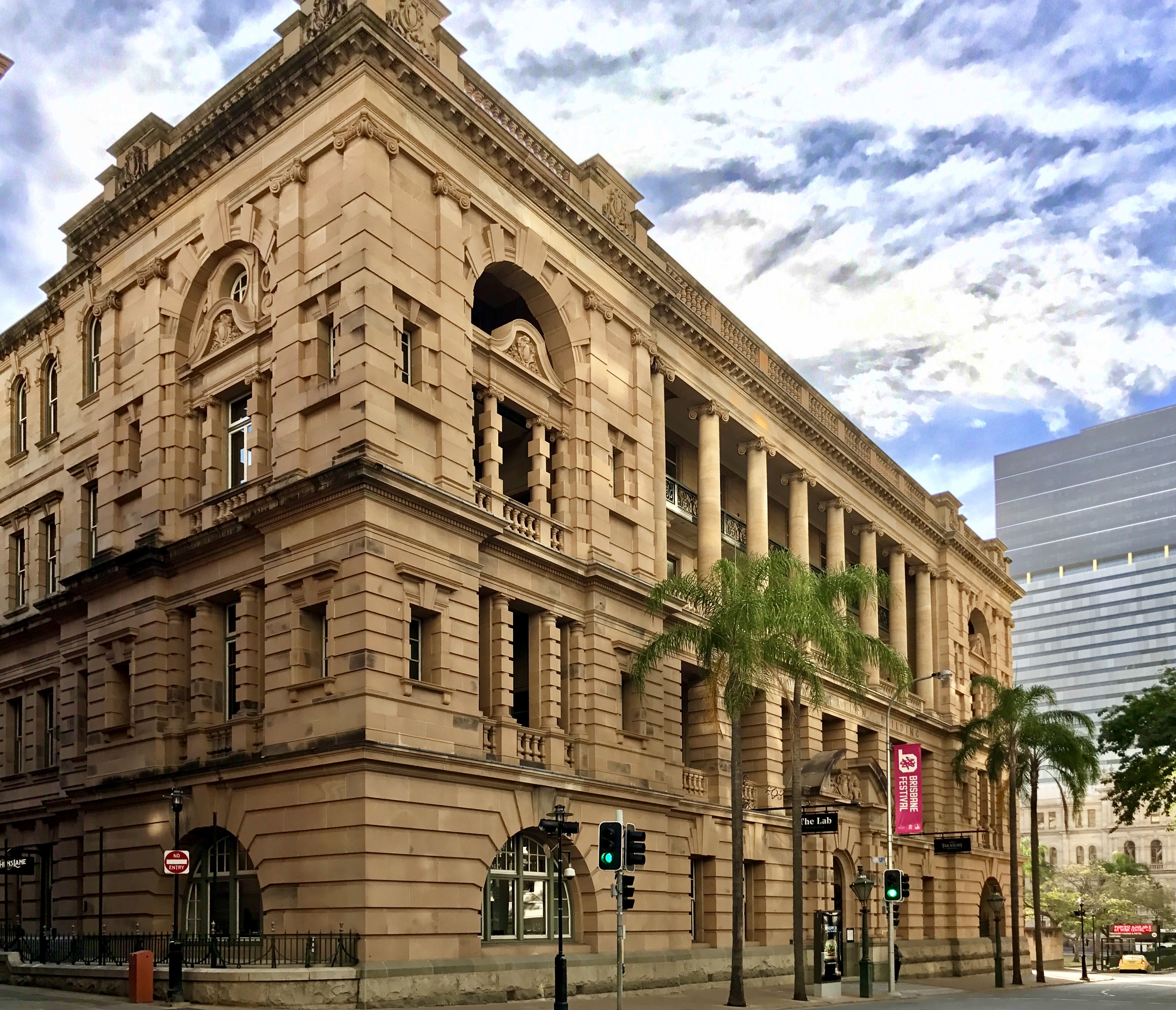
Land Administration Building, Brisbane. Completed 1905

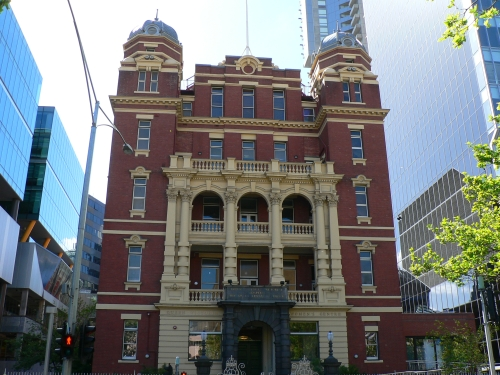
Queen Victoria Hospital, Melbourne. Completed 1916

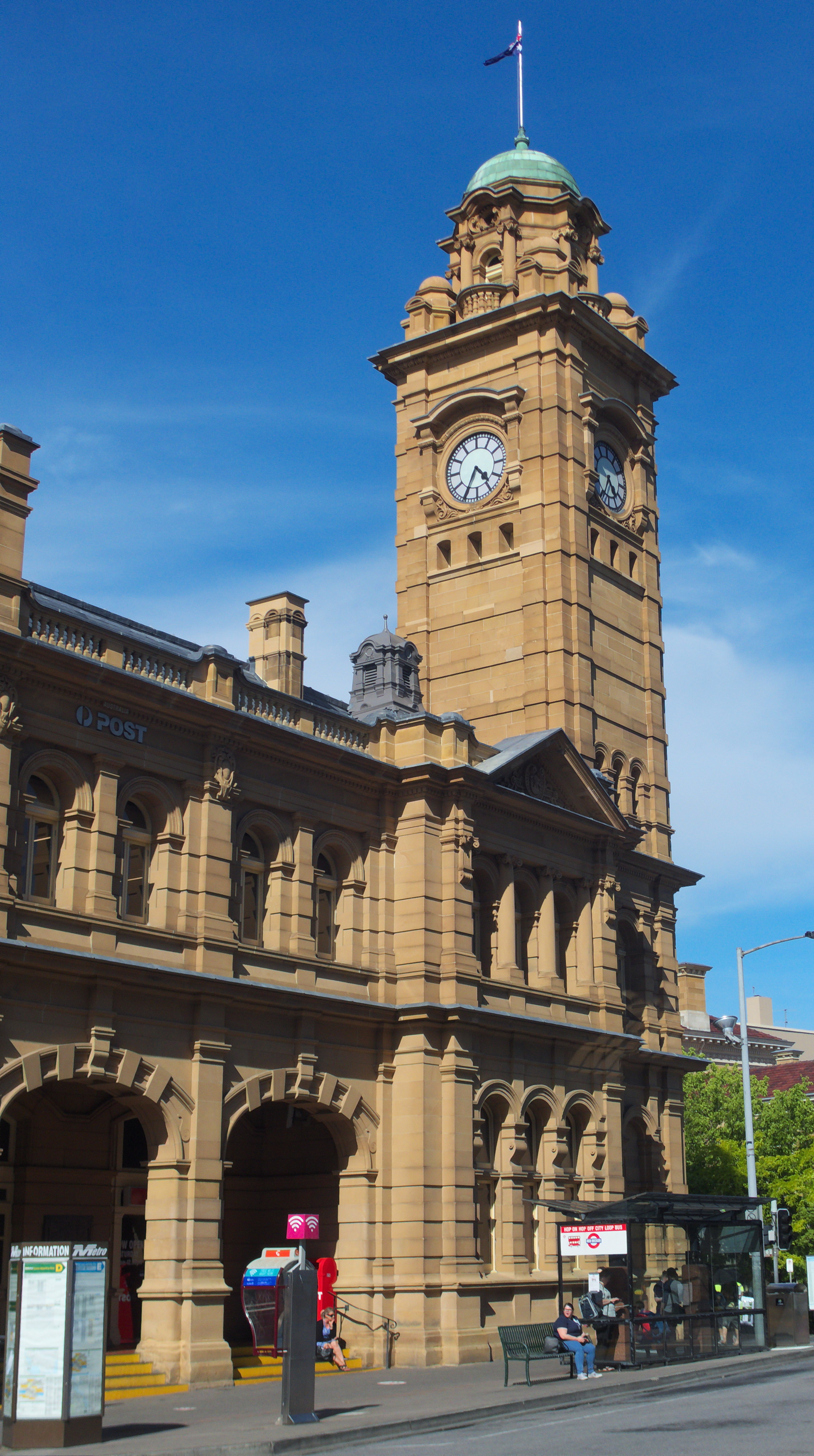
General Post Office, Hobart. Completed 1905

== Federation period (c. 1890–c. 1915) ==
12 styles, each style name prefaced by "Federation":

Academic Classical, Free Classical, Filigree, Anglo-Dutch, Romanesque, Gothic, Carpenter Gothic, Warehouse, Queen Anne, Free Style, Arts and Crafts, Bungalow

=== Federation Academic Classical ===
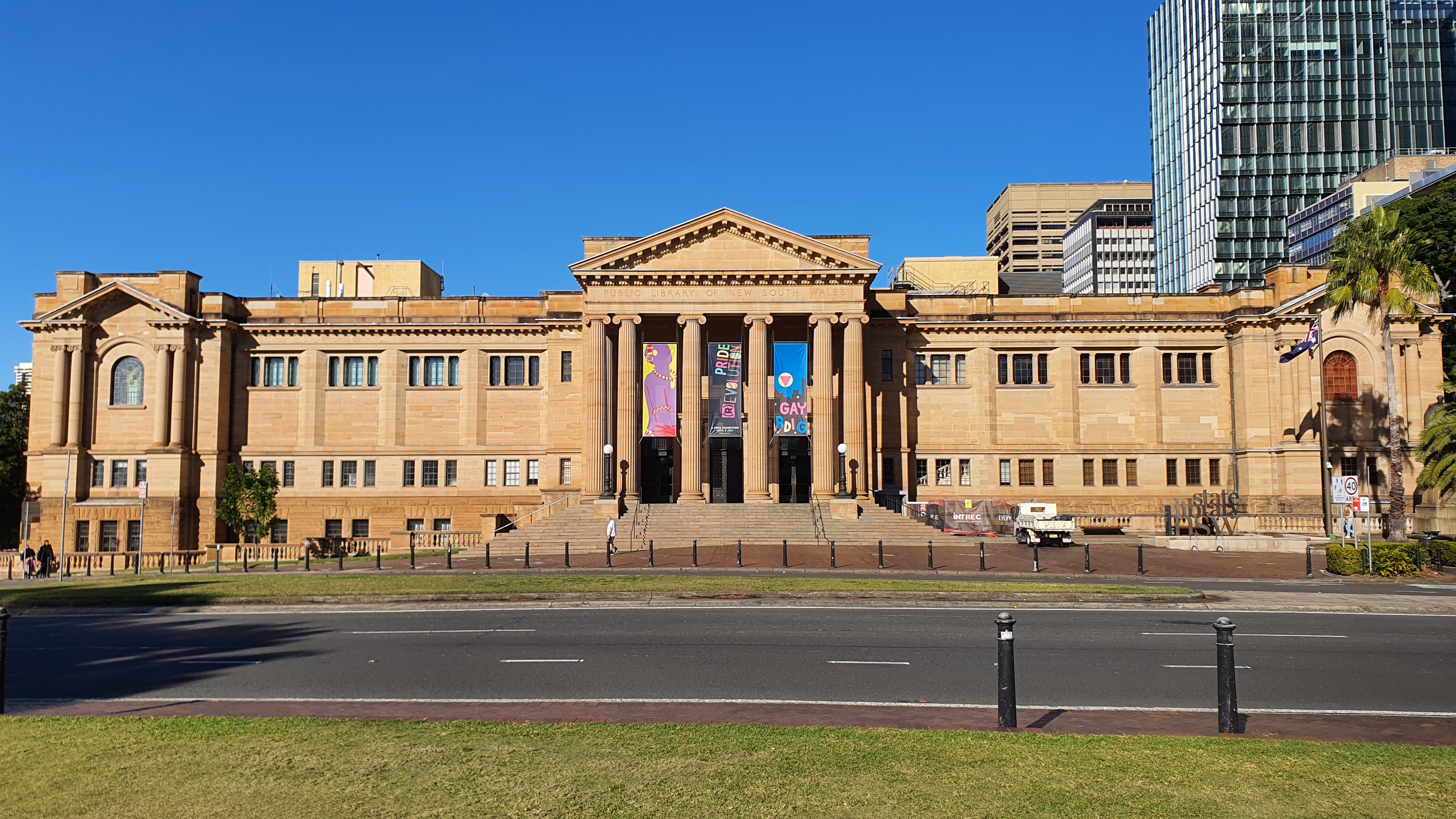
State Library of New South Wales - Mitchell wing 1910 (left) and Dixson Wings 1929 (r)

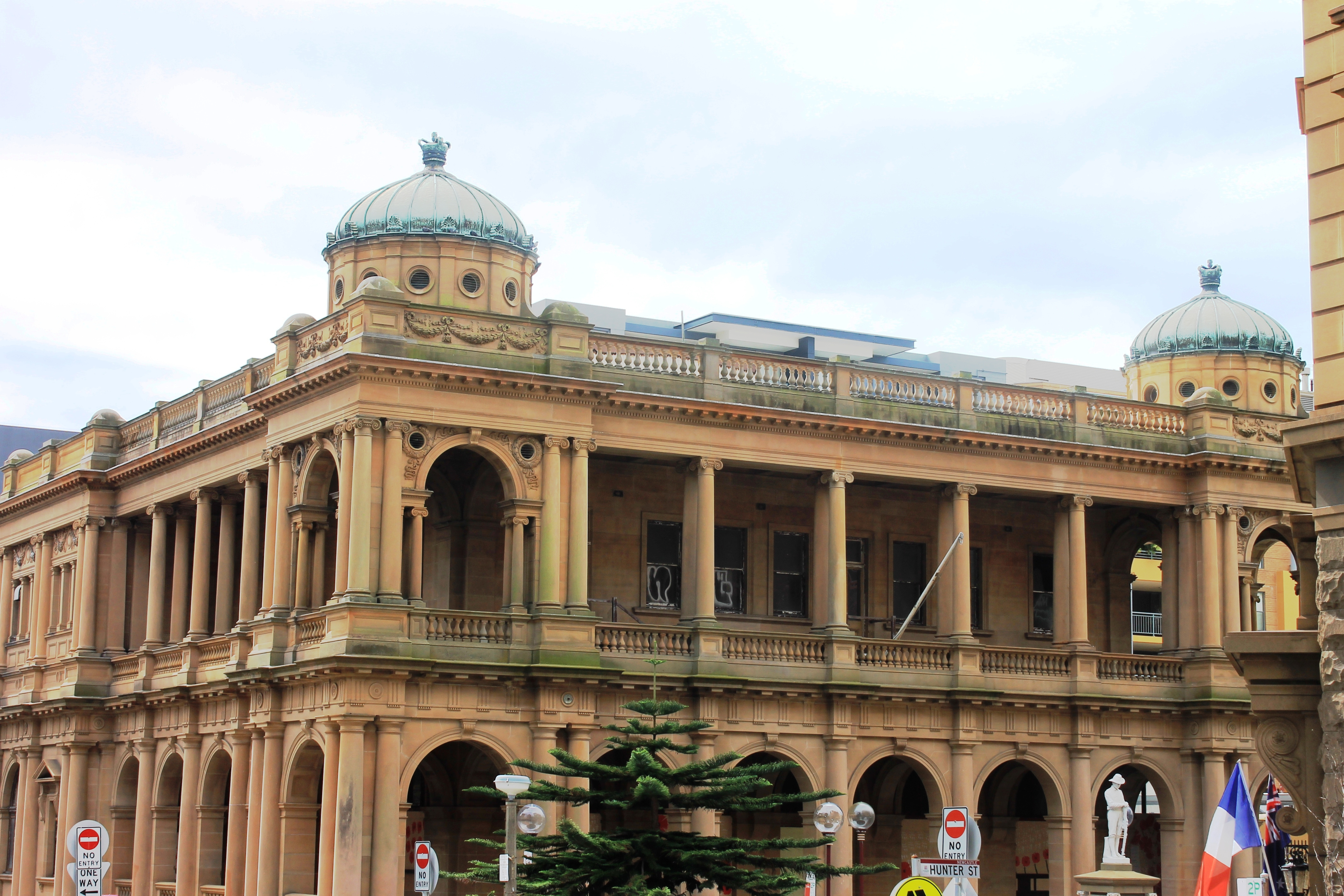
Newcastle Post Office, completed 1903

=== Federation Free Classical ===
Notable examples include: Sydney Hospital (Sydney), Taronga Zoo Pavilion (Sydney), the main terminus building of the Central railway station in Sydney, Flinders Street station (Melbourne), Sacred Heart Church (St Kilda, Victoria), Read's Emporium (Prahran, Victoria), Old Royal Hotel (Williamstown, Victoria), the former Queensland Lands Administration Building (Brisbane).

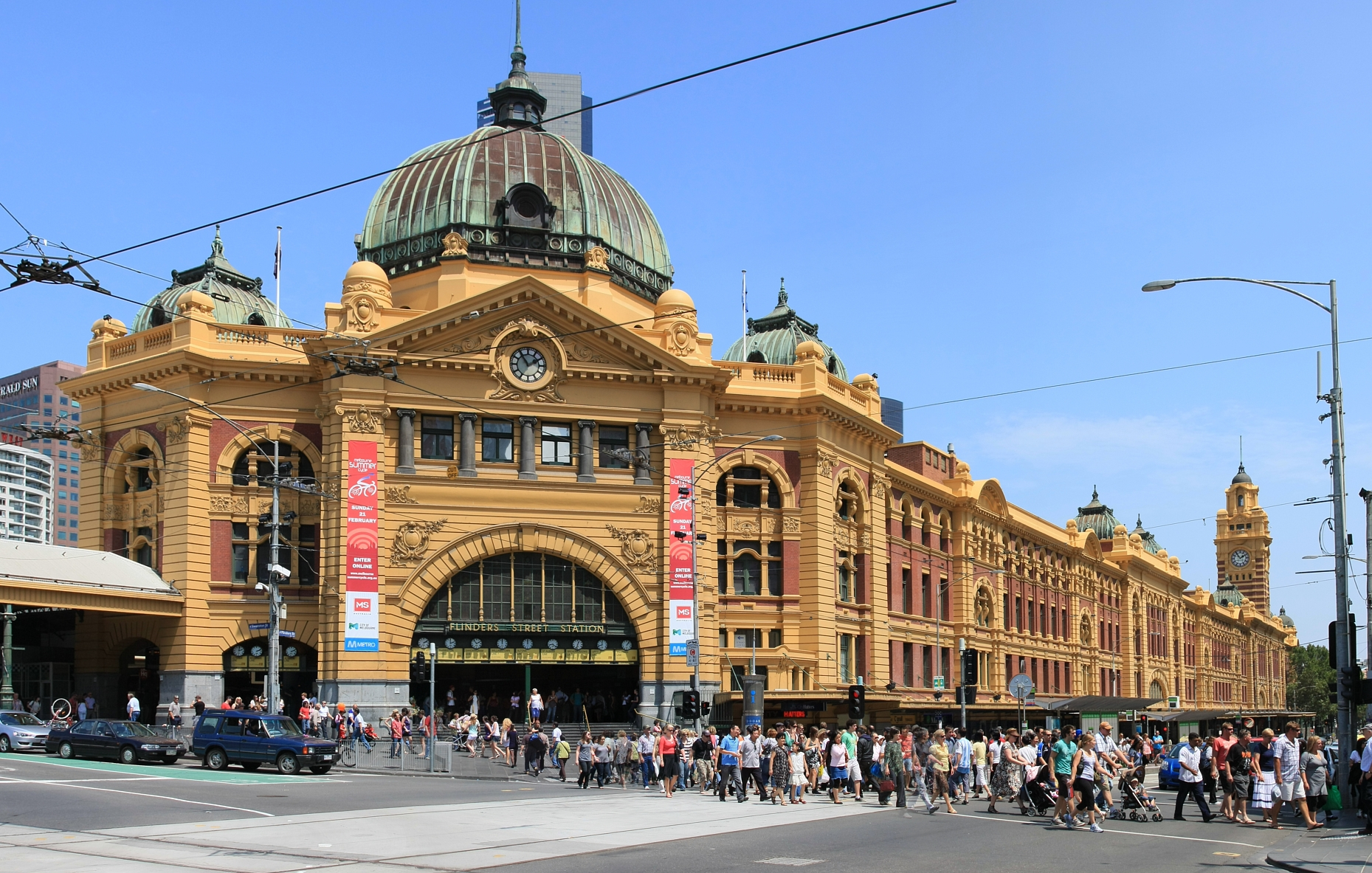
Flinders Street station, Melbourne, completed 1910

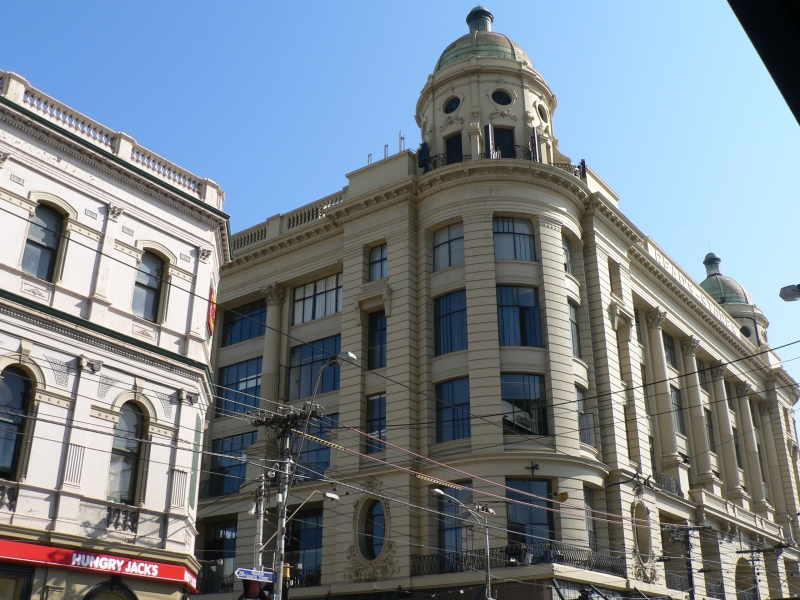
Former Read's Emporium, Prahran, completed 1914

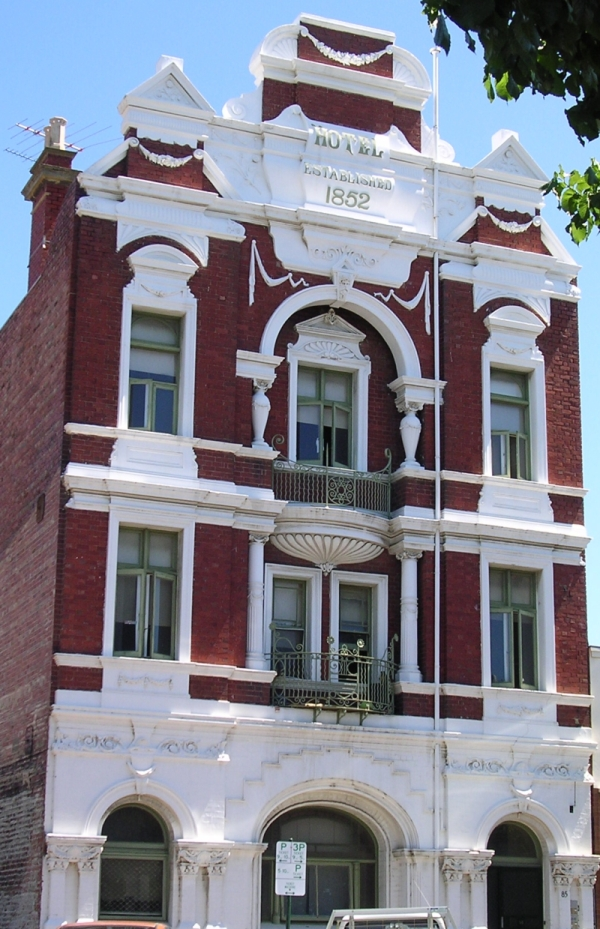
Old Royal Hotel, Williamstown, with arts and crafts influences

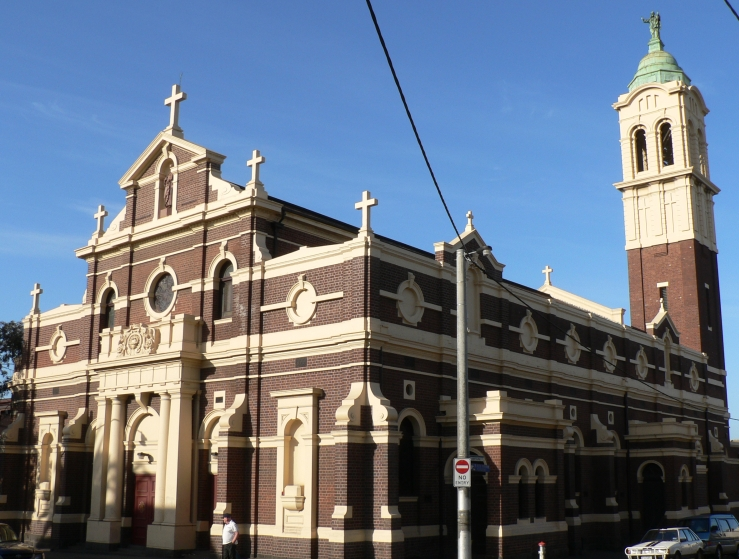
Sacred Heart Church, St Kilda, completed 1891

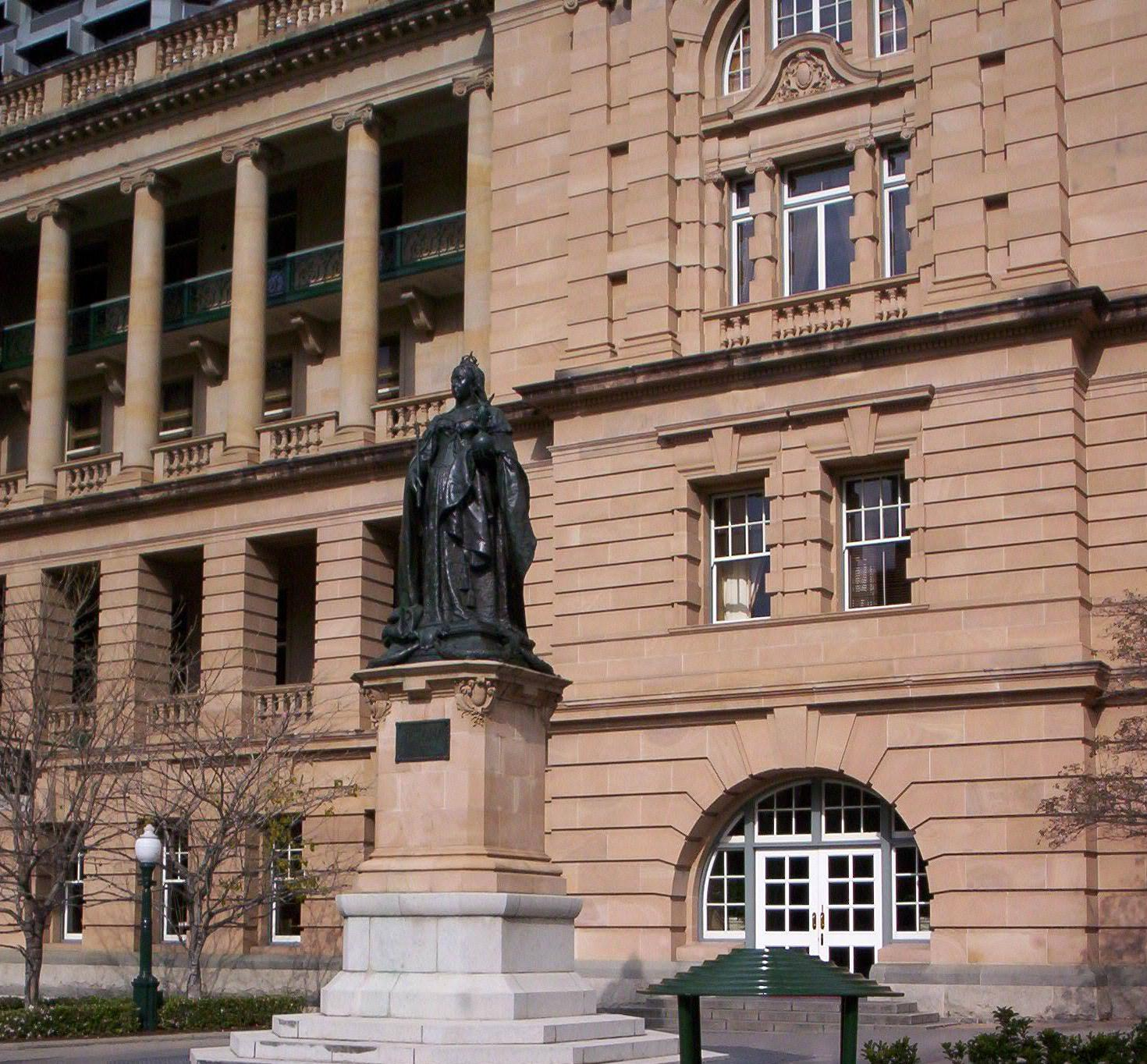
Former Lands Administration Building, Brisbane, completed 1905

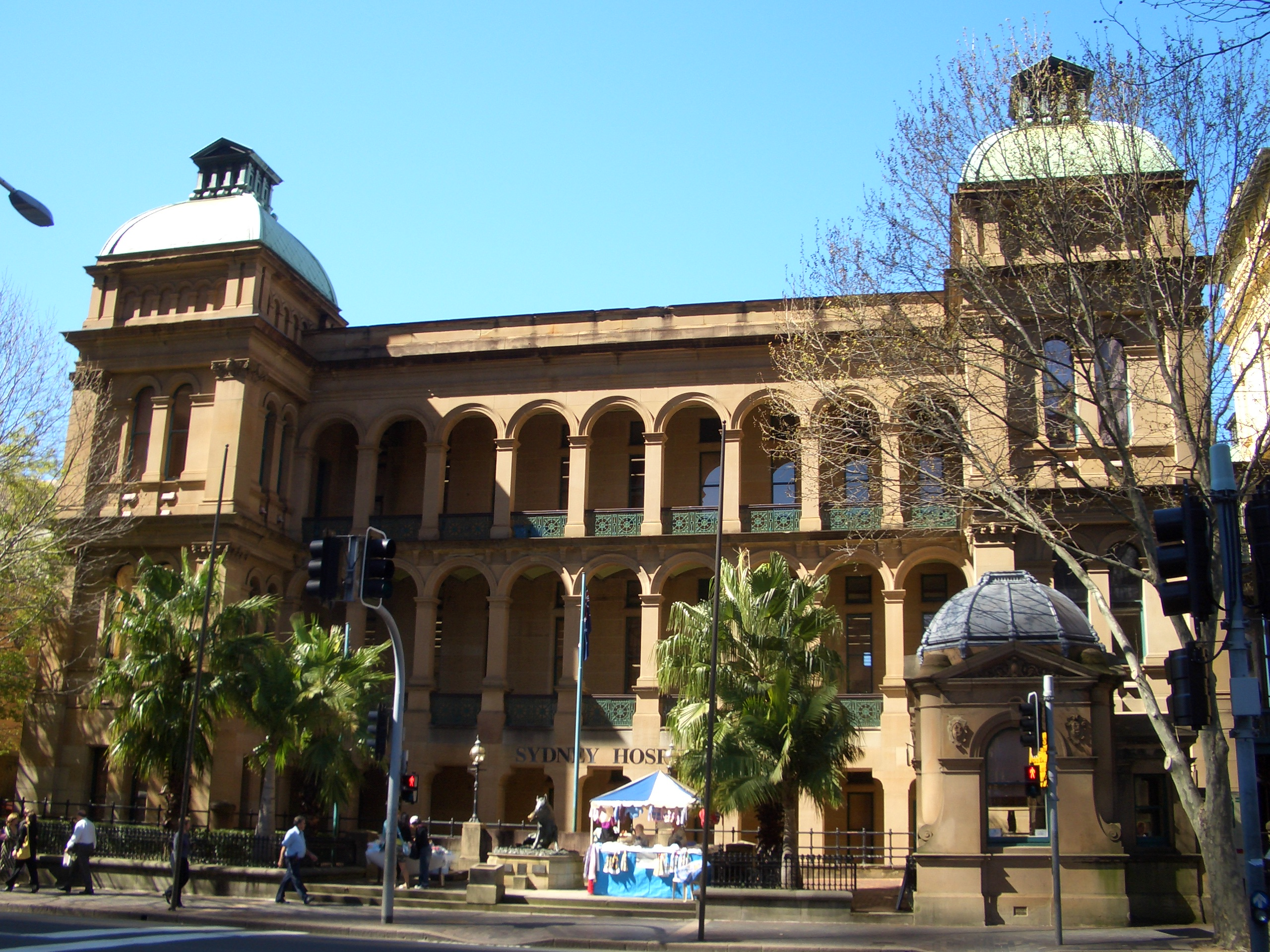
Sydney Hospital, completed 1894

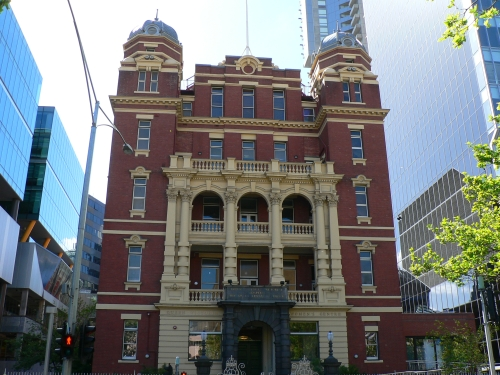
Queen Victoria Hospital, Melbourne completed 1912

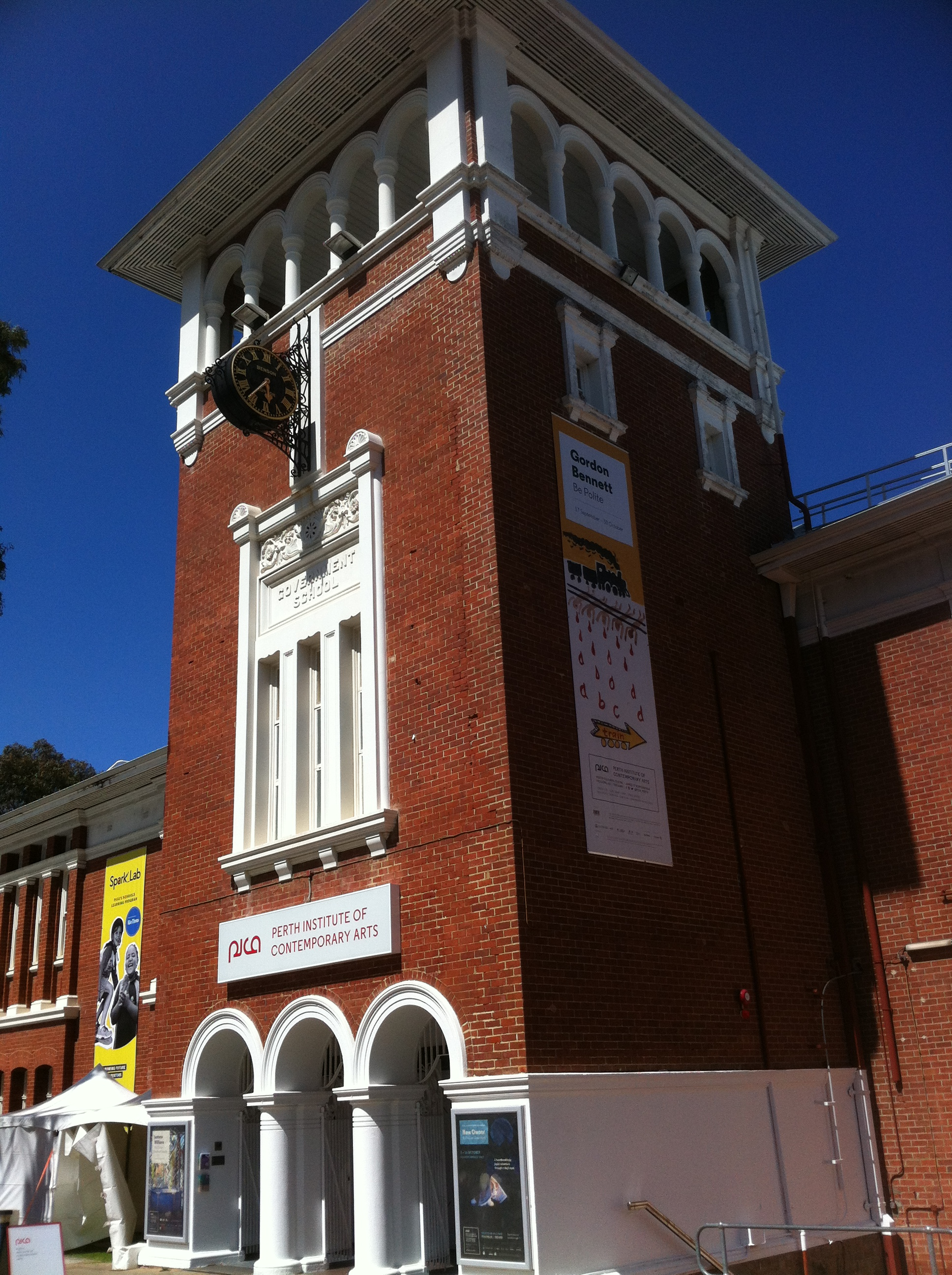
Perth Institute of Contemporary Arts Building, completed 1896

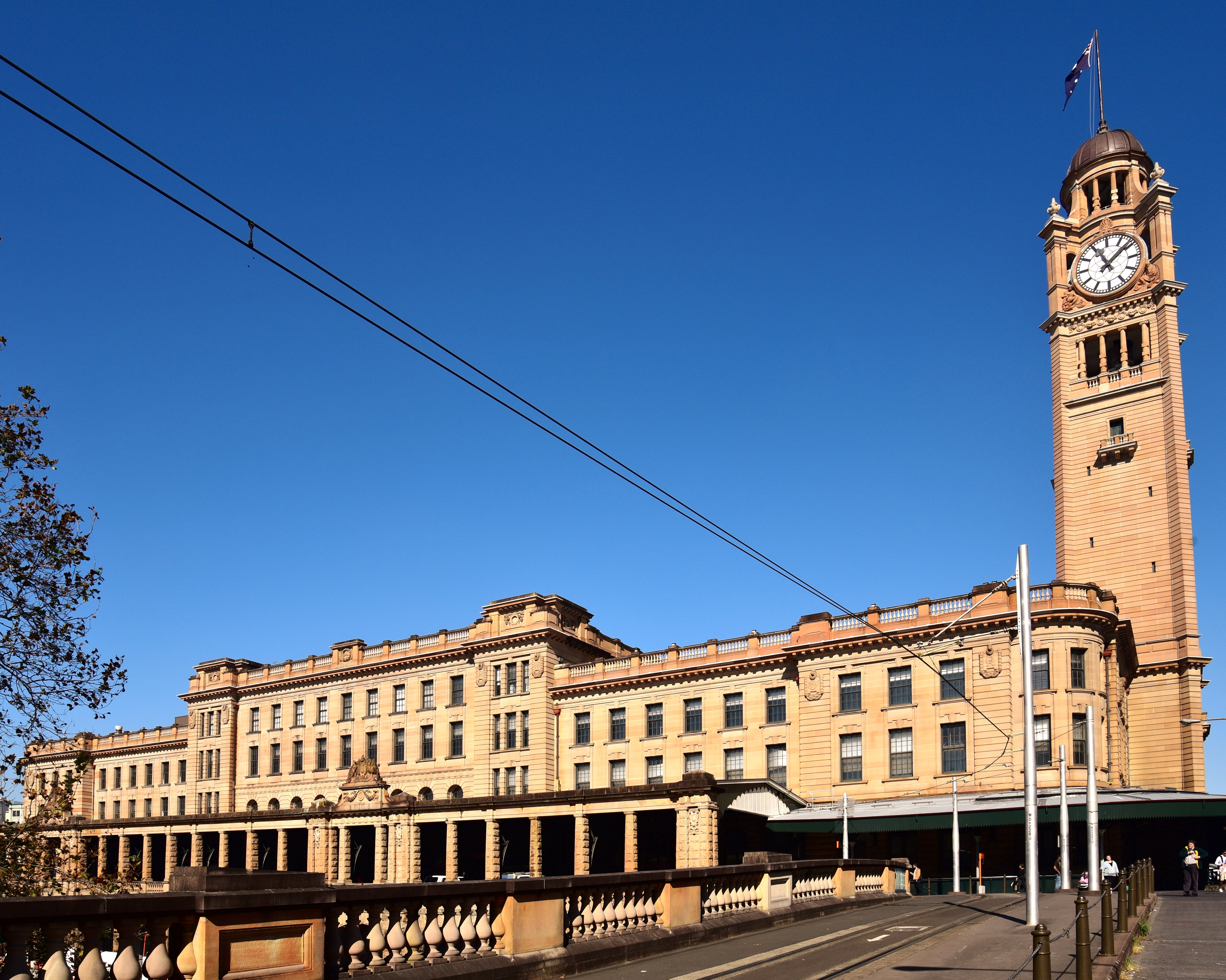
Central railway station, Sydney. Completed 1906

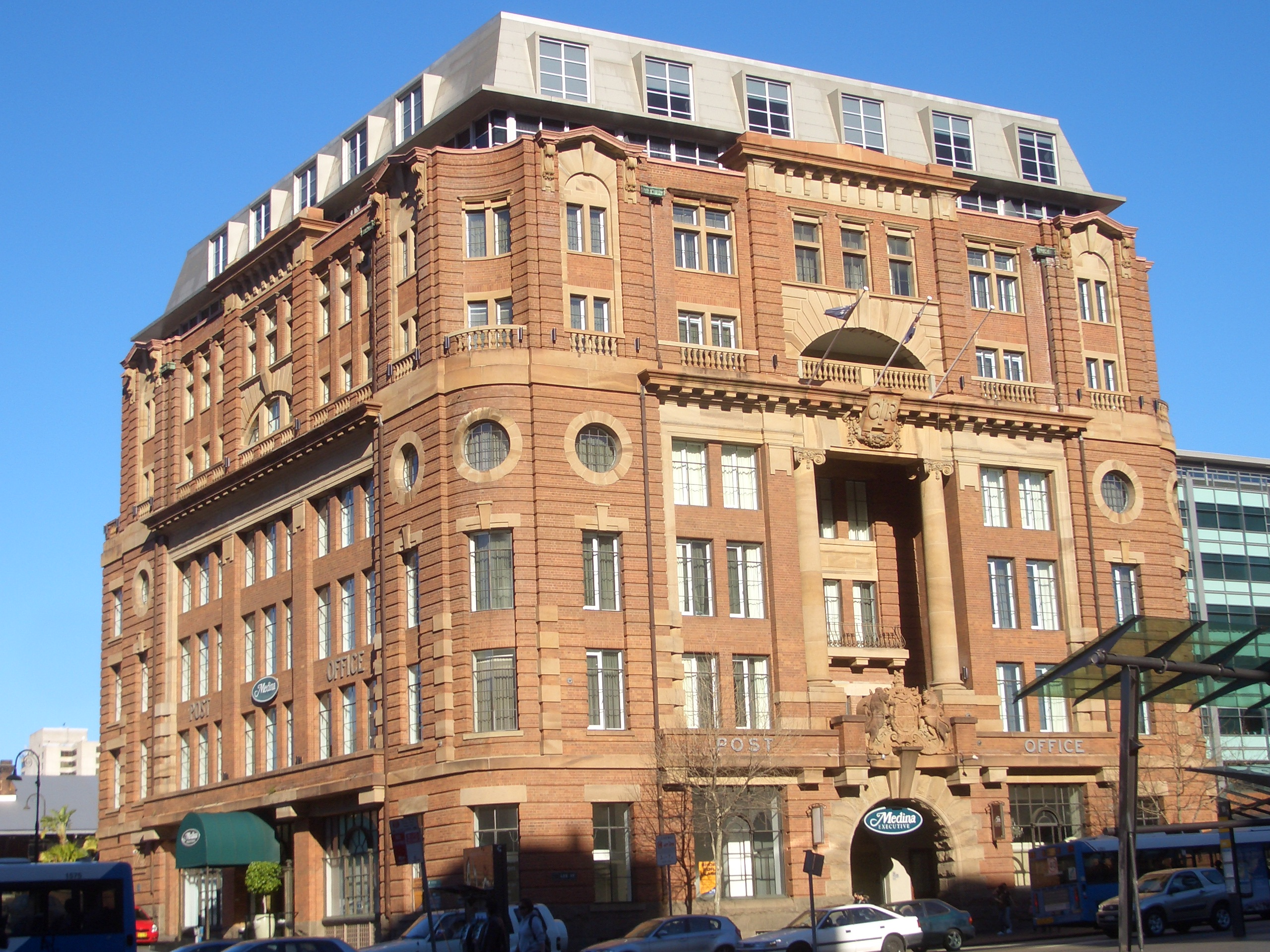
Former Parcels Post Office, Railway Square, Sydney. Completed 1913

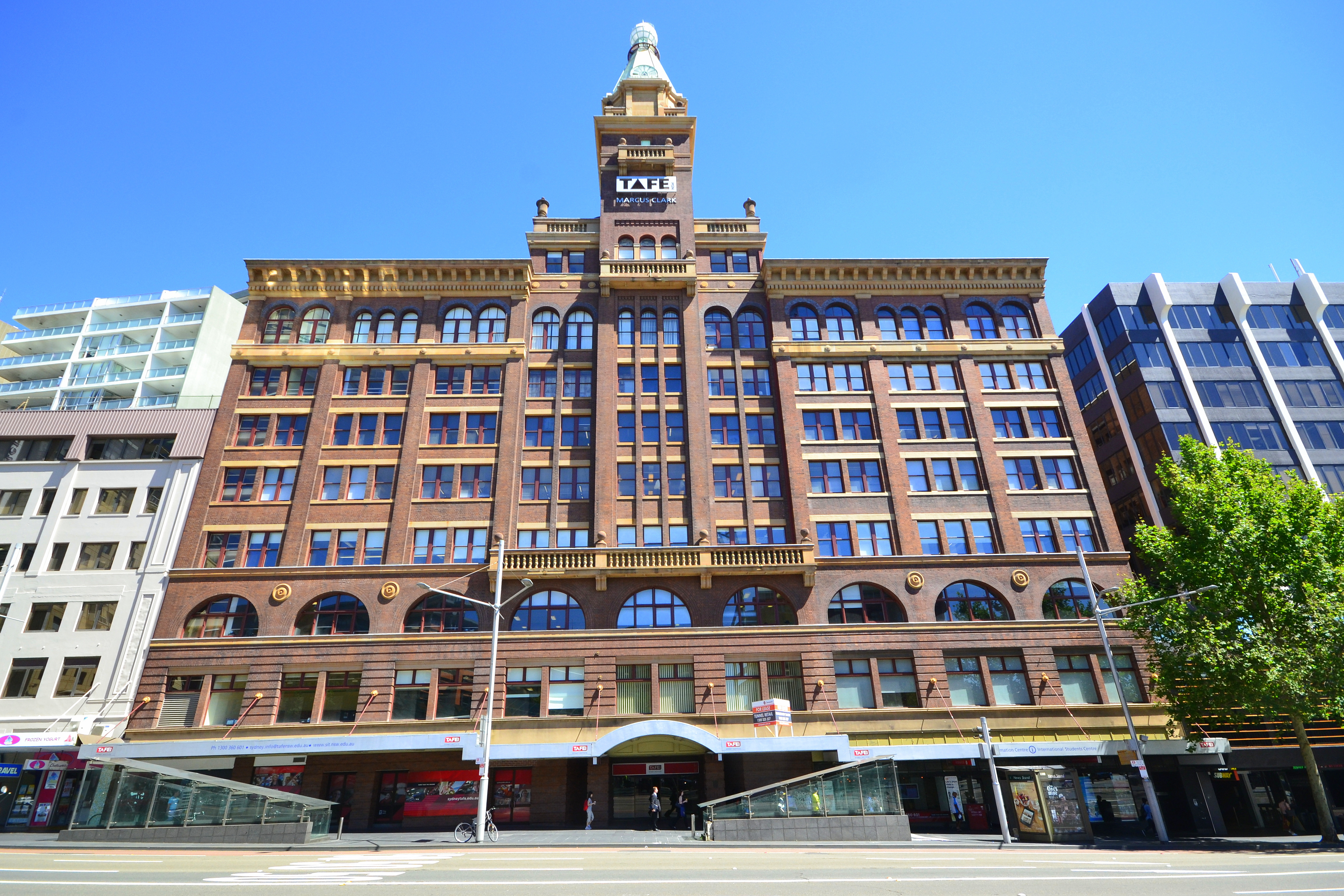
Marcus Clarke Building (TAFE), Railway Square, Sydney. Completed 1910-1924

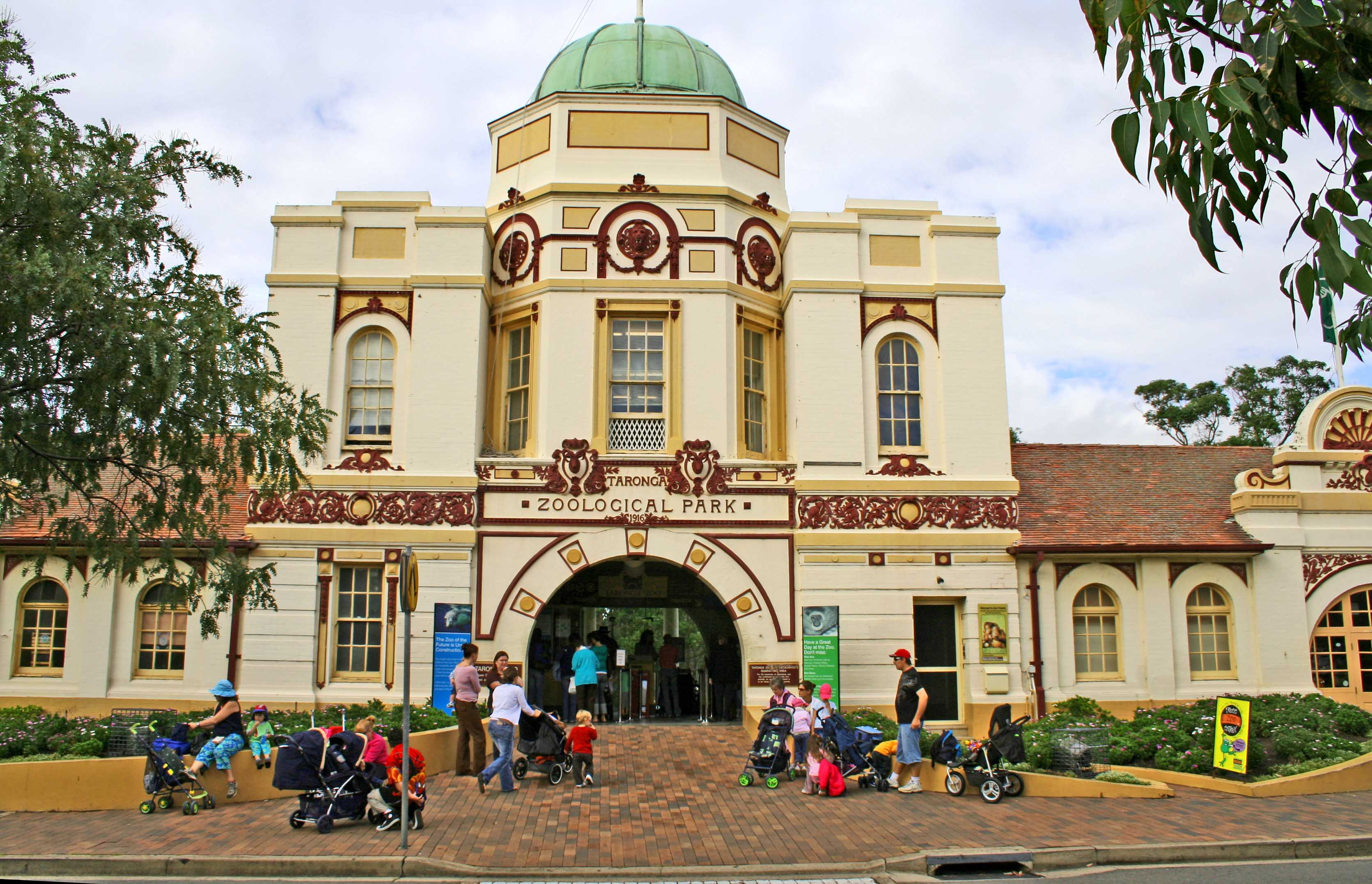
Taronga Zoo. Completed 1916

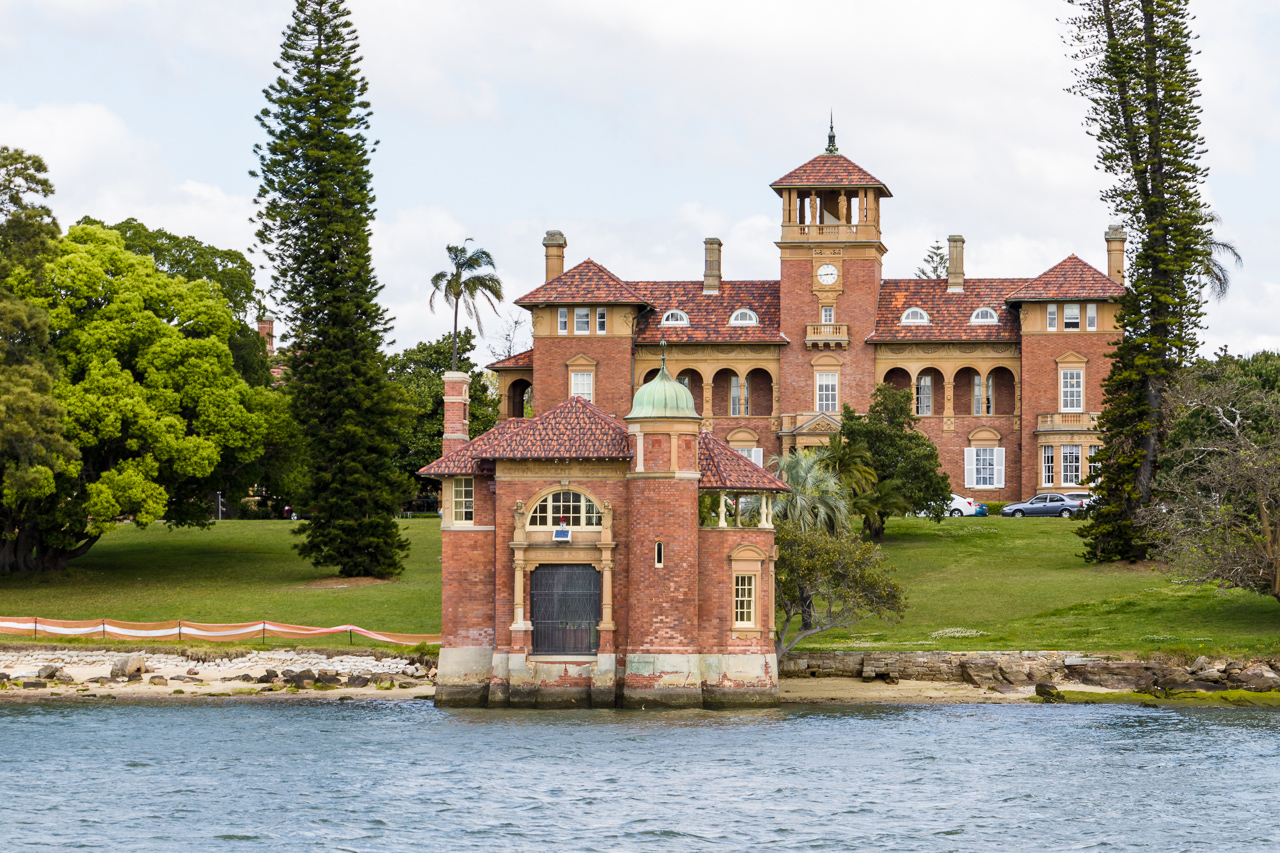
Thomas Walker Convalescent Hospital Buildings, Concord. Completed 1893

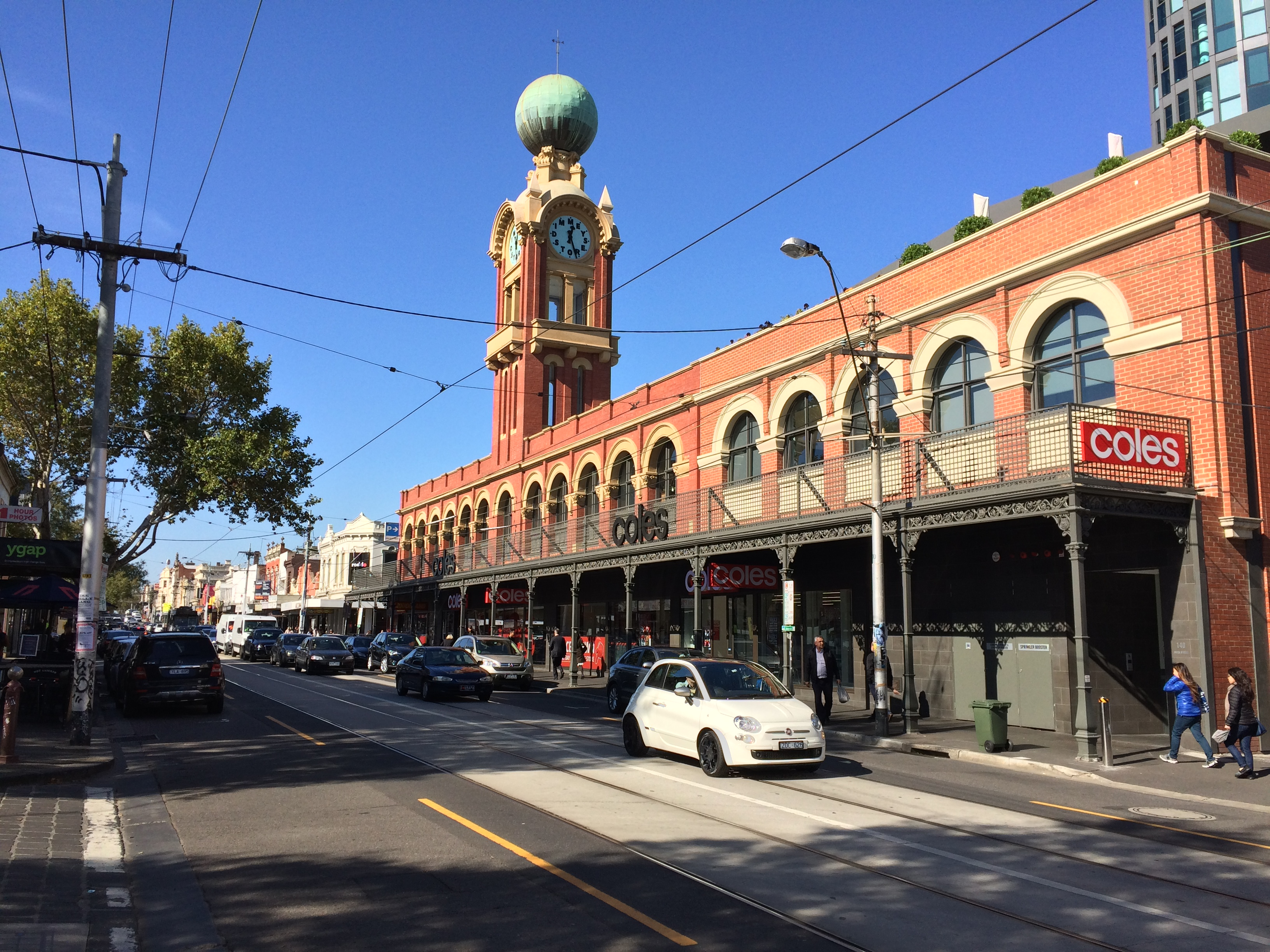
Dimmey's Building, Richmond, Victoria. Built c. 1910.

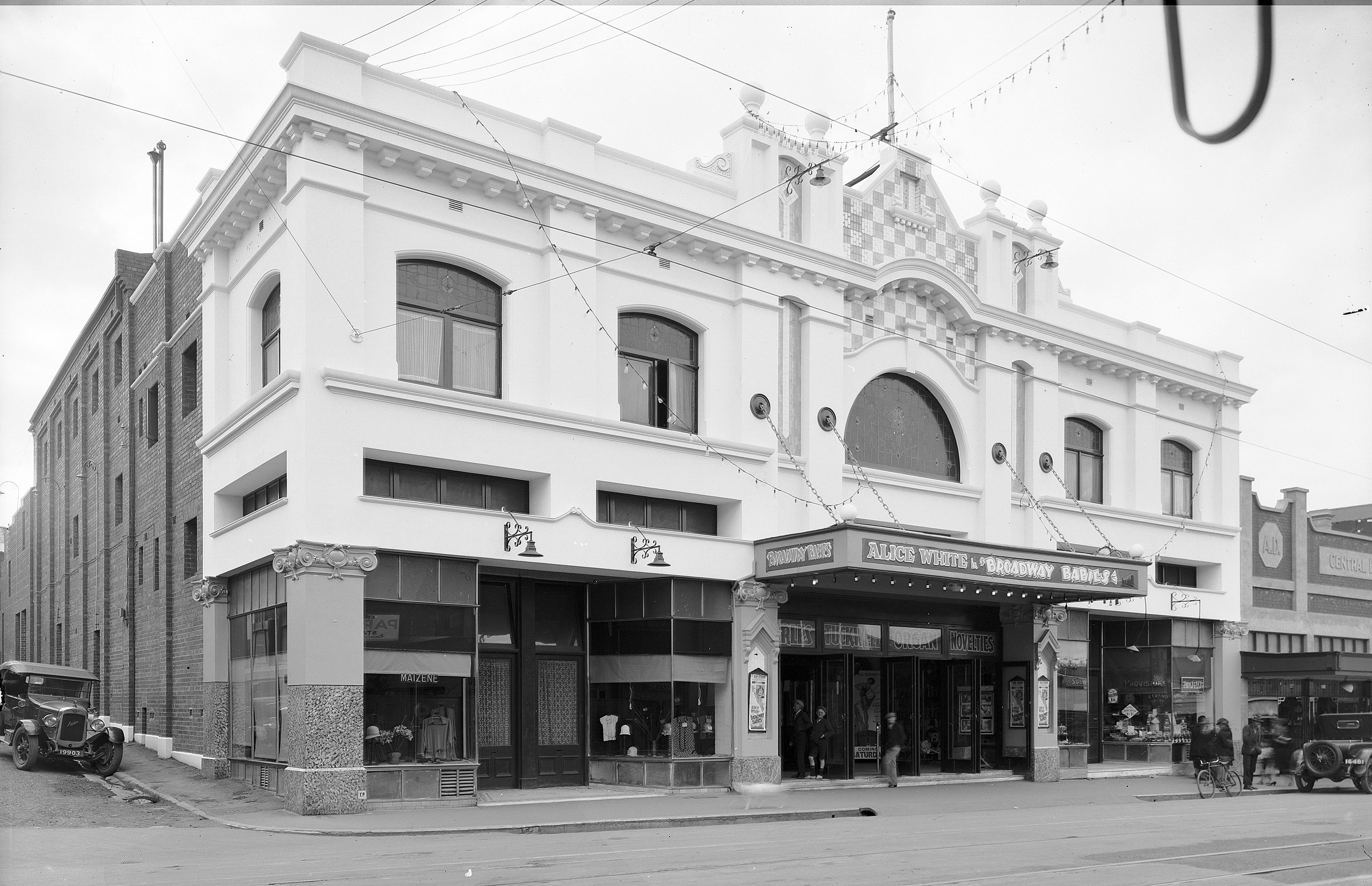
Odeon Theatre, Hobart. Completed 1916, pictured in 1929

=== Federation Second Empire ===
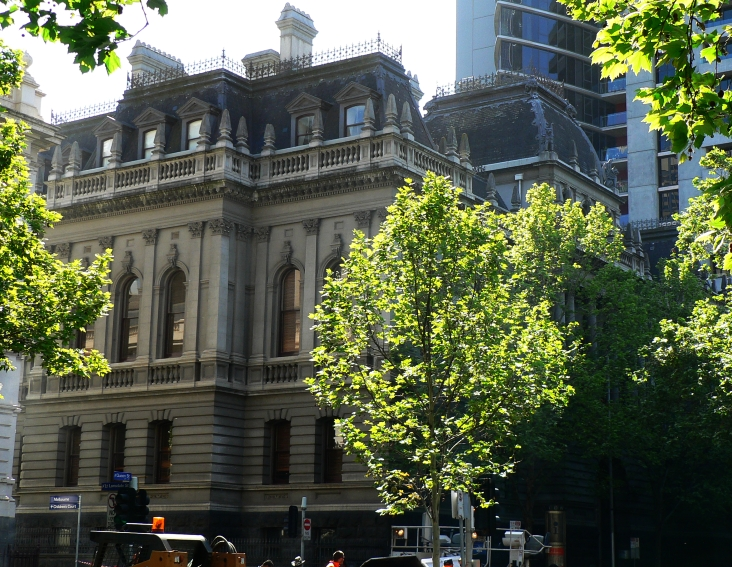
Former Records Office. Queen Street, Melbourne. Completed 1900.

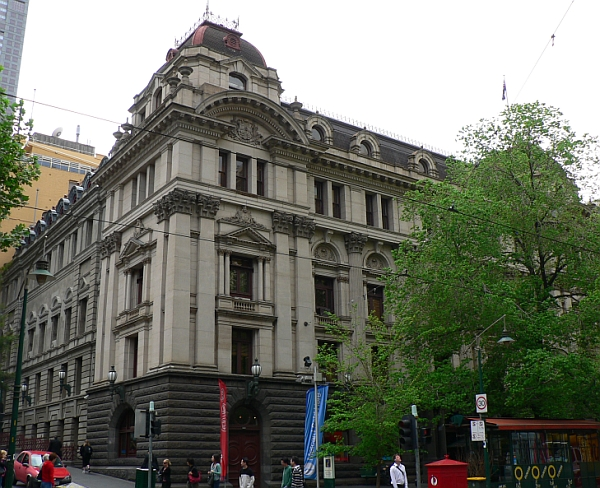
Town Hall Administration Buildings. Swanston Street, Melbourne. Completed 1908.

=== Federation Filigree ===
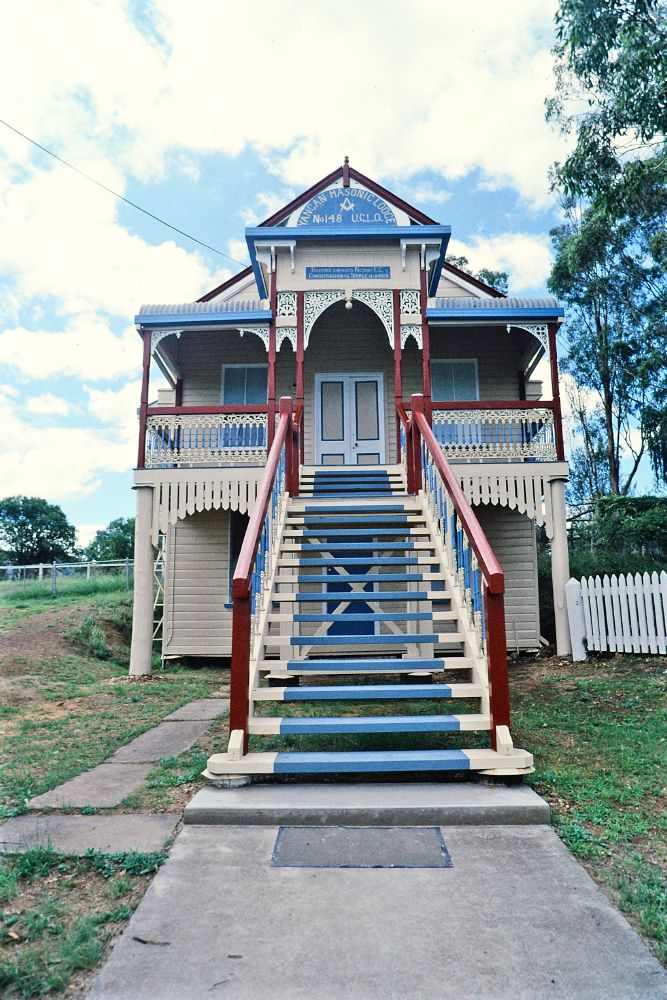
Yangan Masonic Hall; built c. 1898.

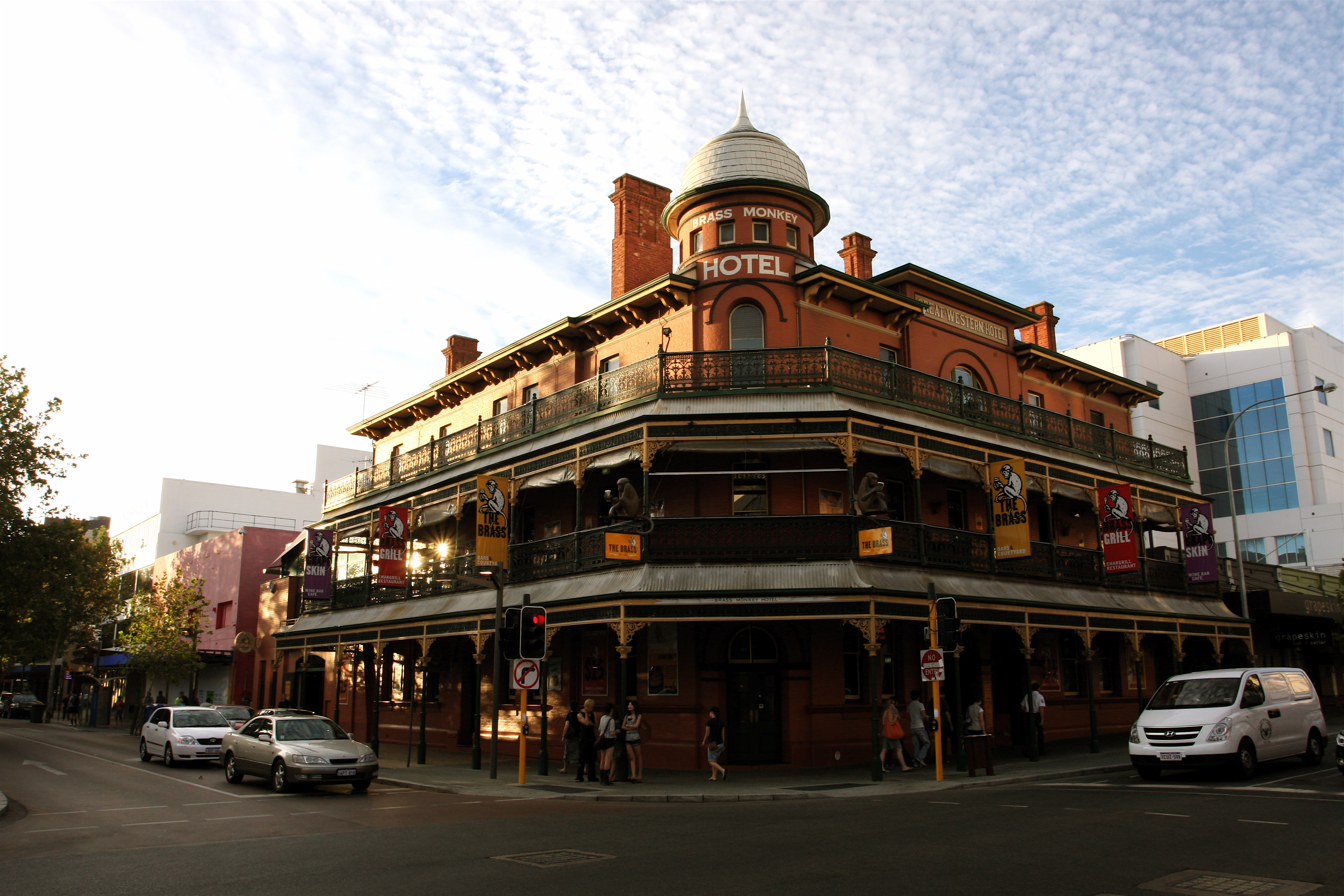
Brass Monkey Hotel, Perth; built 1896.

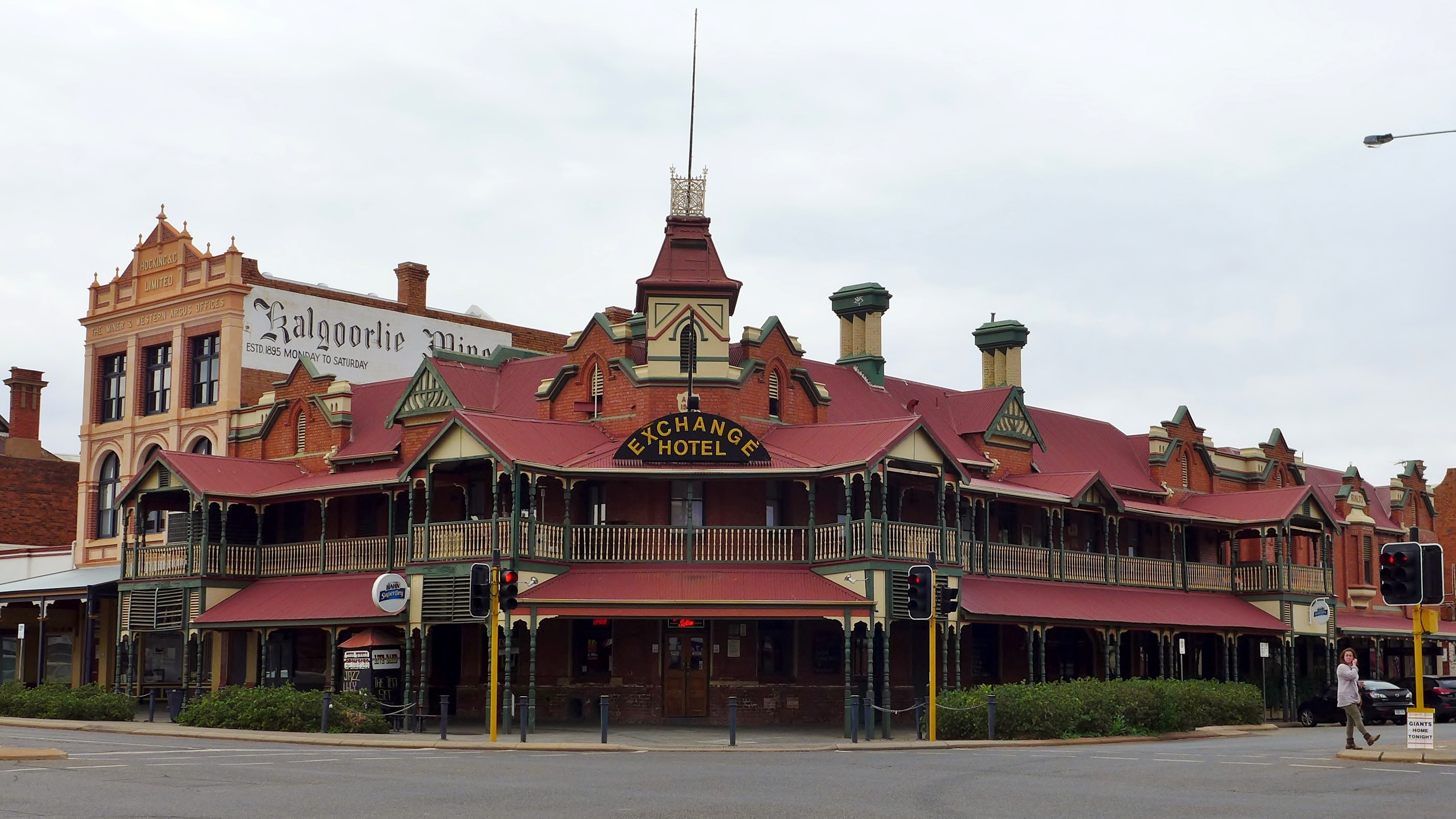
Exchange Hotel, Kalgoorlie. Completed 1900.

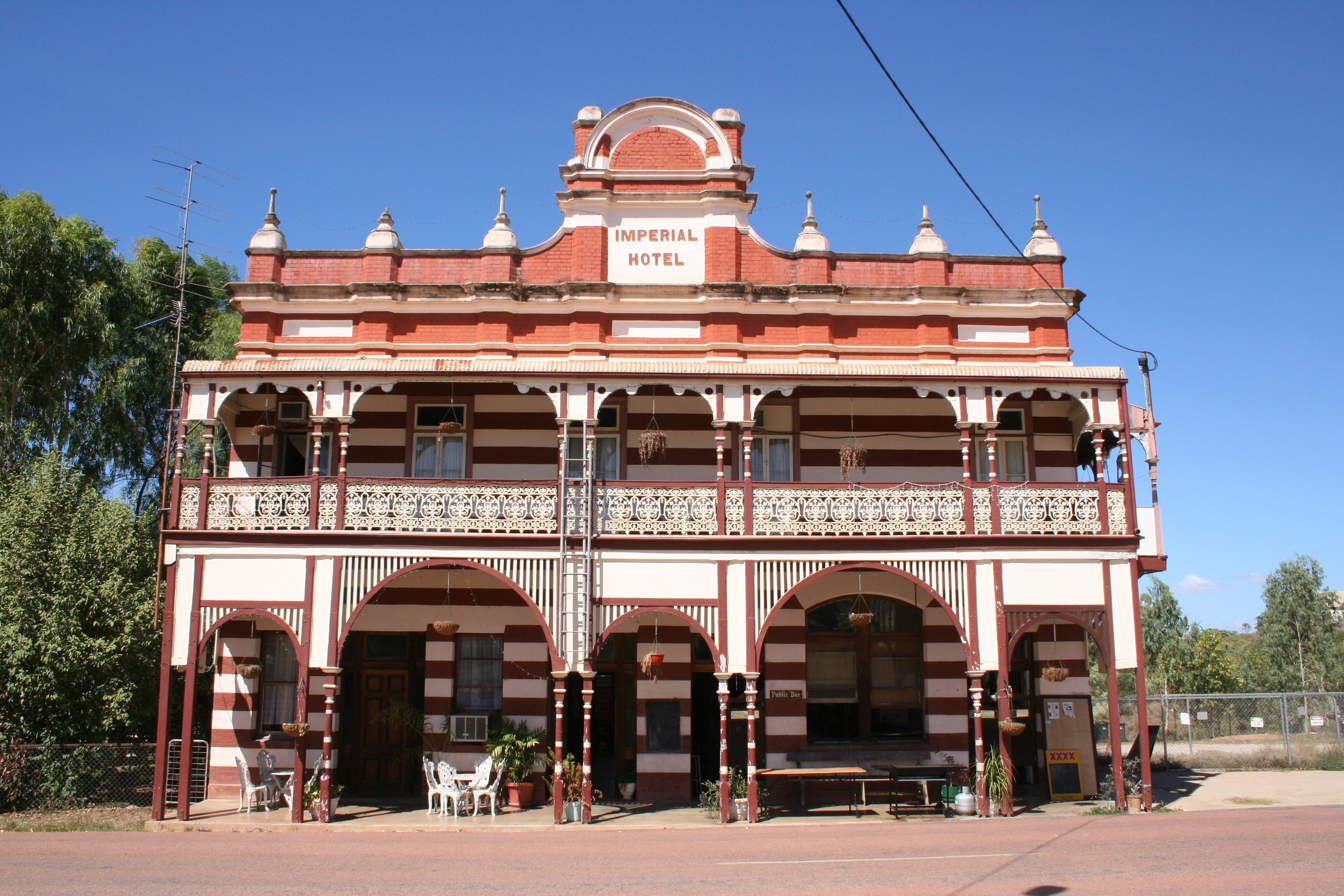
Imperial Hotel, Ravenswood; with prominent fretwork verandah; built 1901.

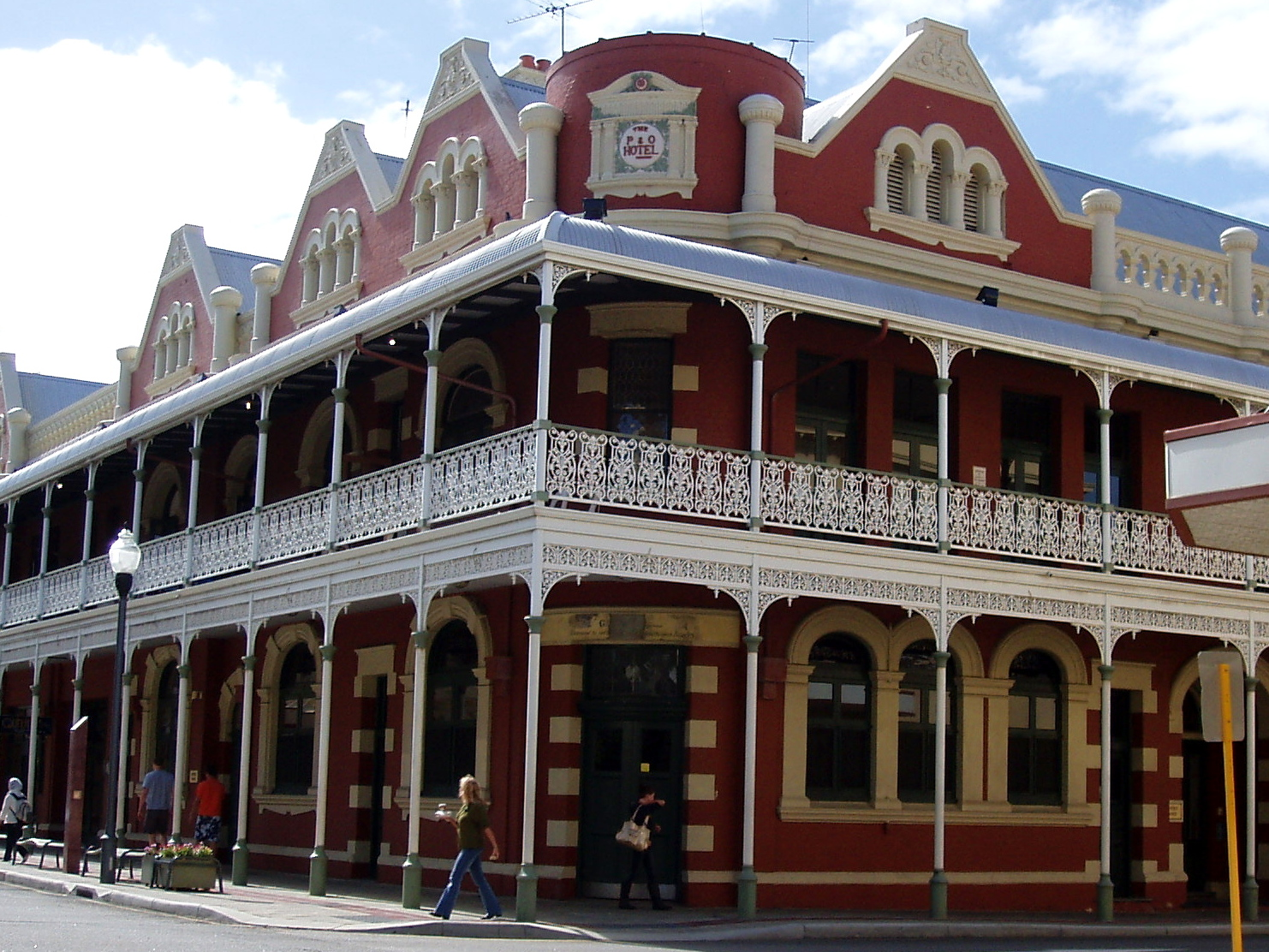
P&O Hotel, Fremantle. Completed 1901

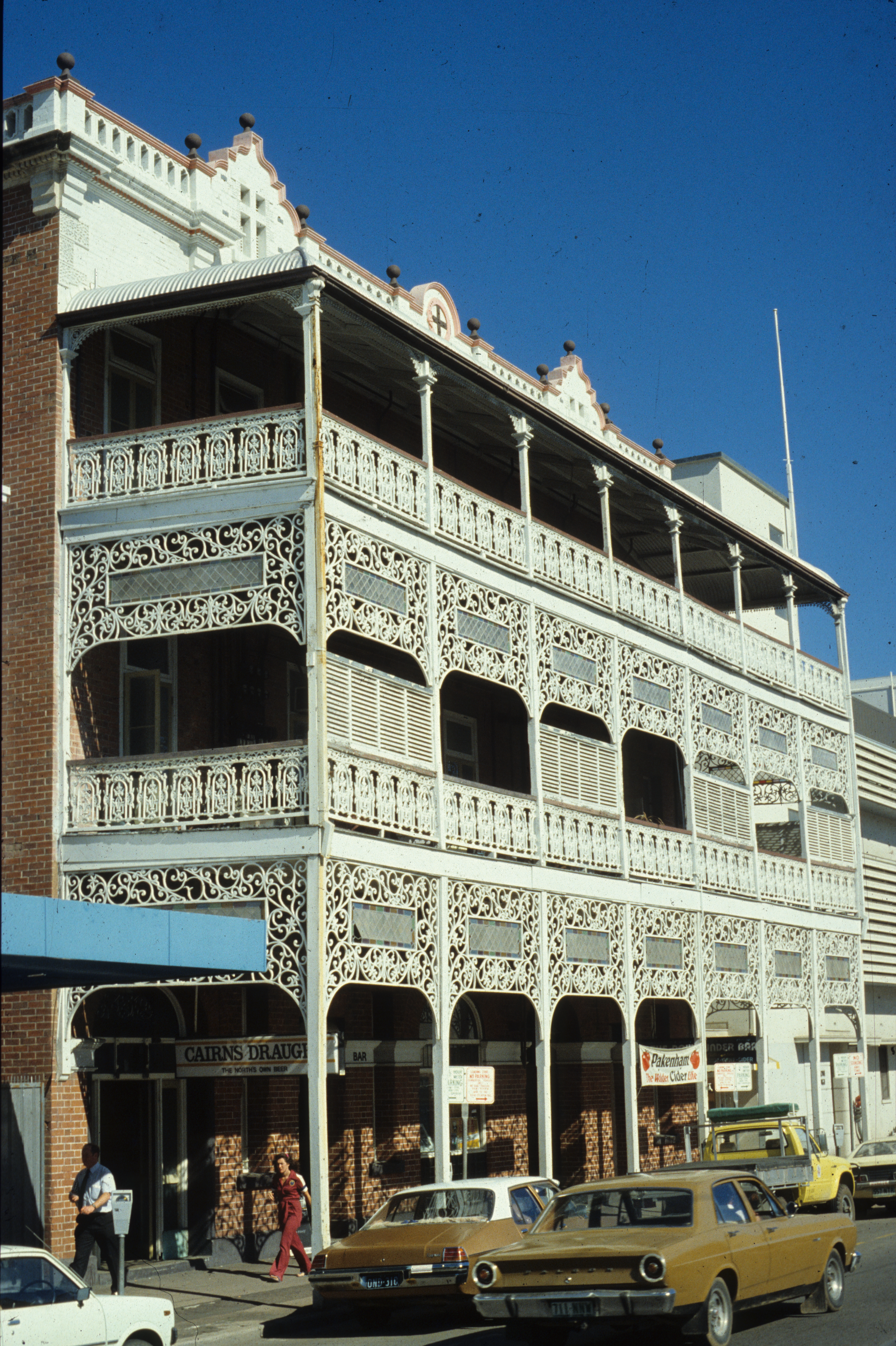
Buchanan's Hotel, Townsville. Built 1902, demolished 1984. Three-tiered filigree in cast iron, wrought iron, timber and glass.

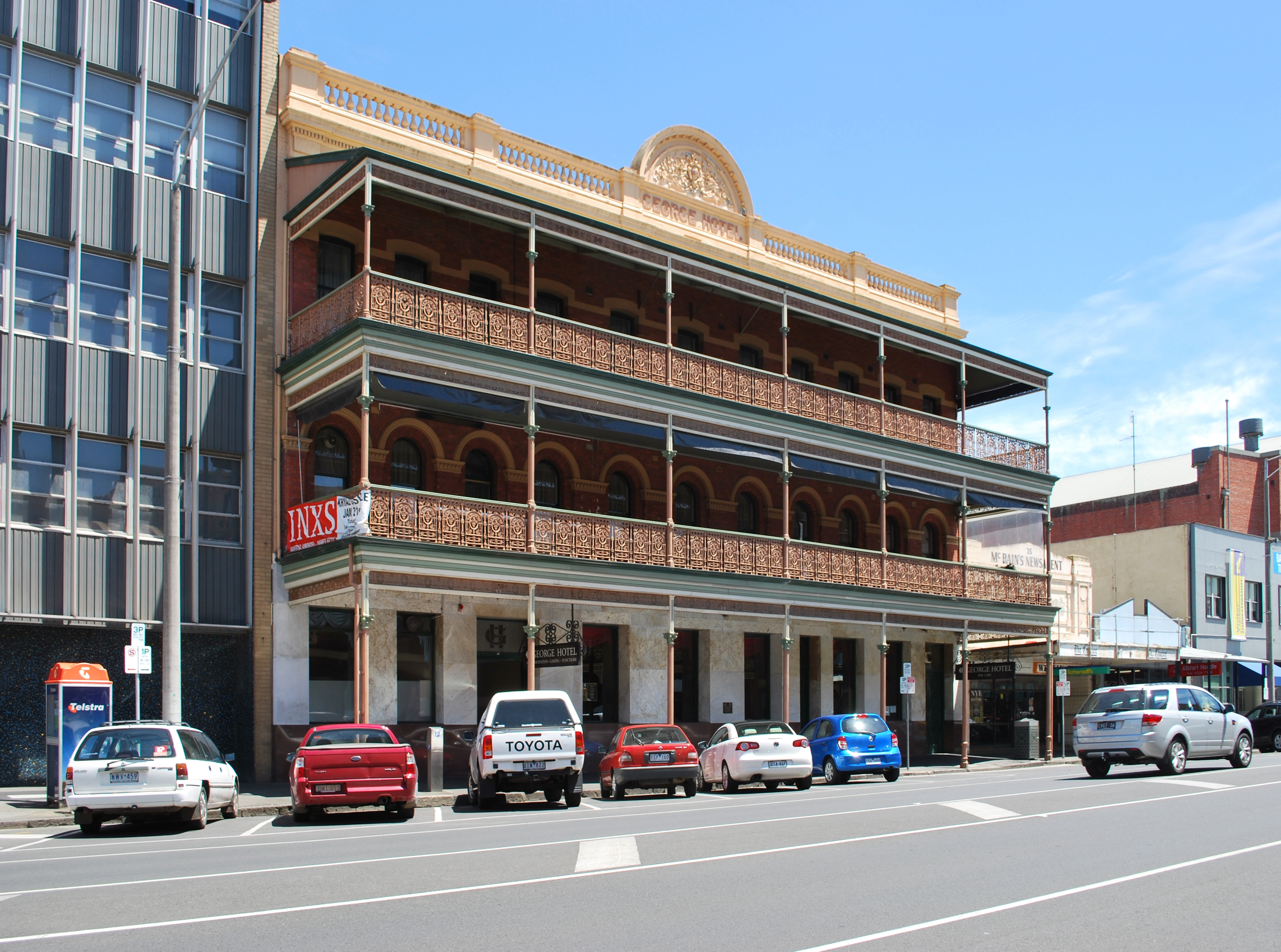
George Hotel, Ballarat. Built 1902.

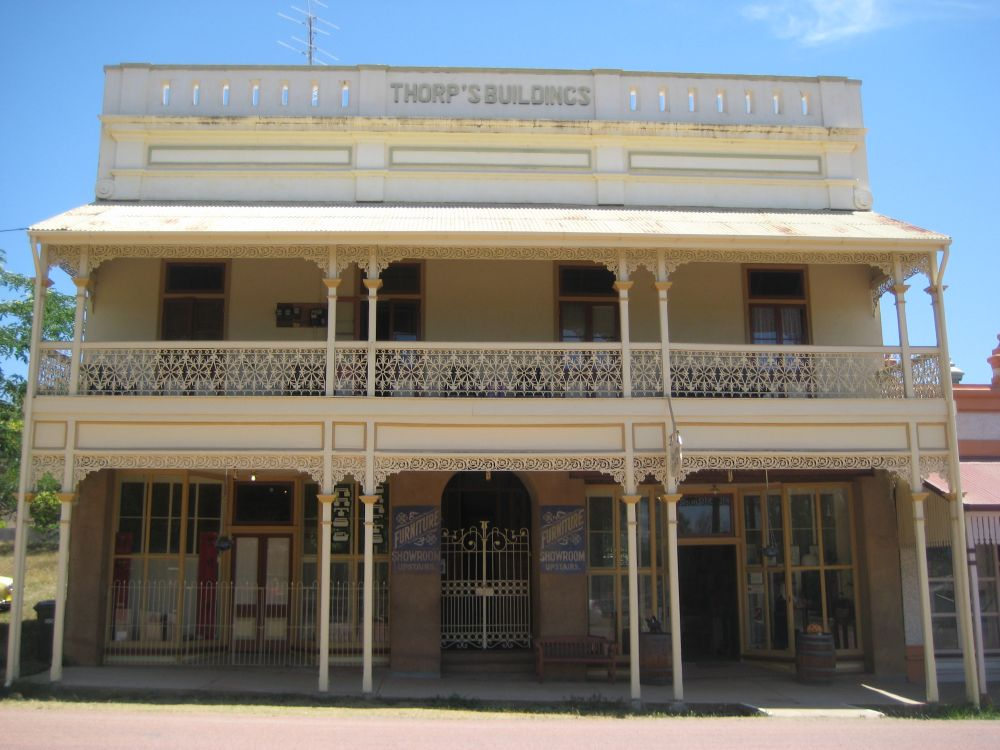
Thorps Building, Ravenswood; two-storey shop completed c. 1903.

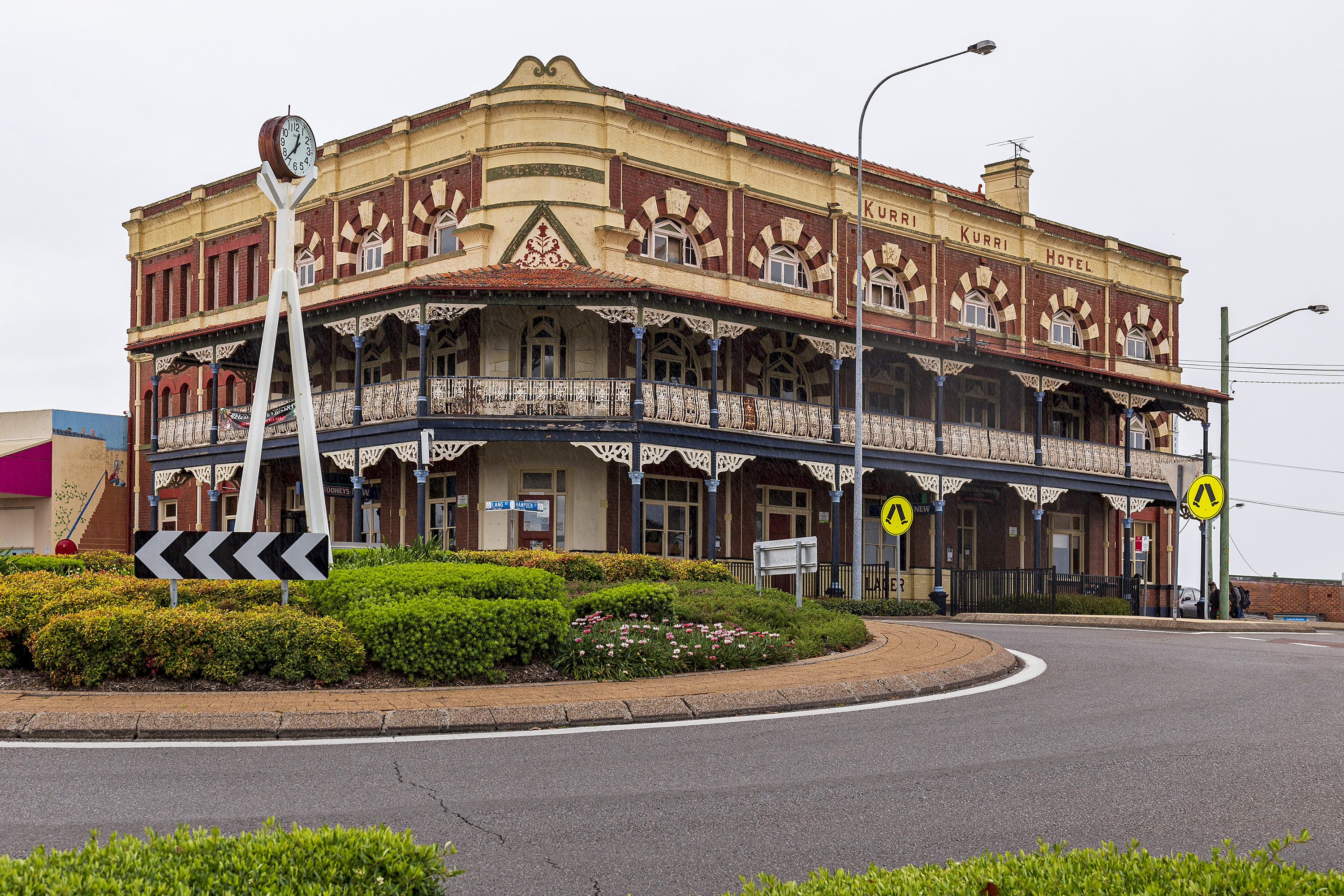
Kurri Kurri Hotel, Kurri Kurri; built c. 1904.

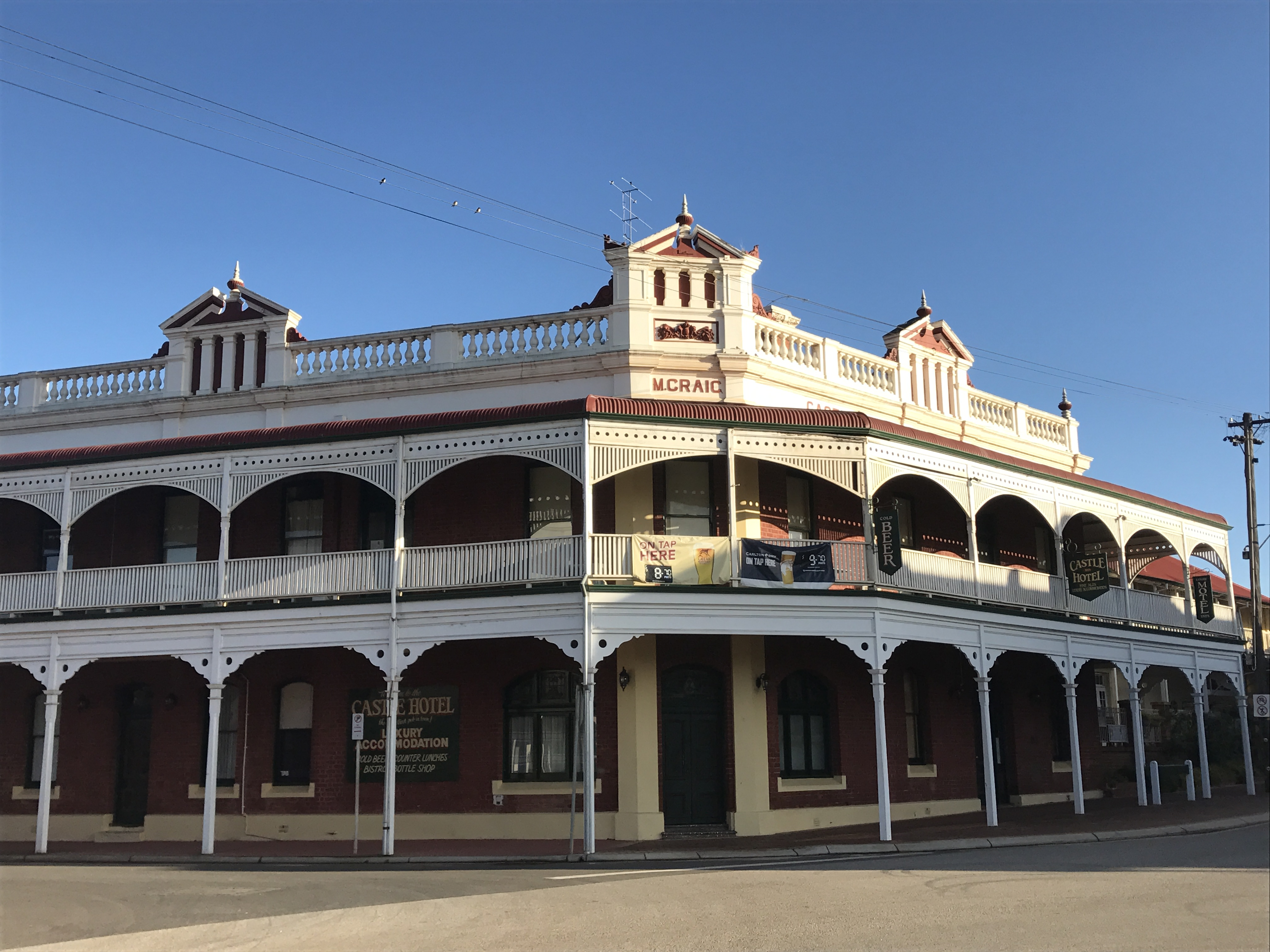
Castle Hotel, York; verandah and timber fretwork added c. 1905.

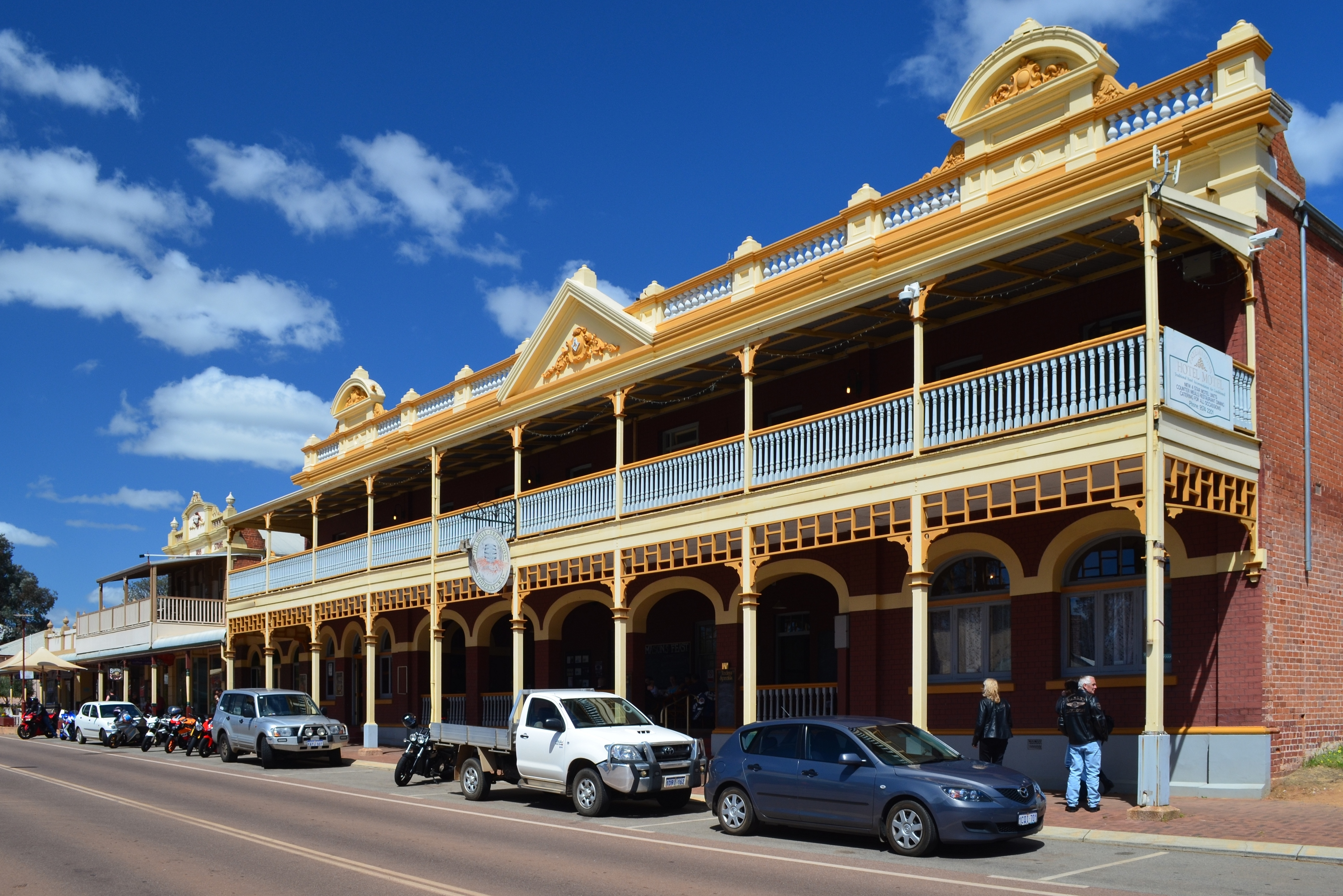
Freemasons Hotel (Toodyay); two-storey verandah added c. 1905.

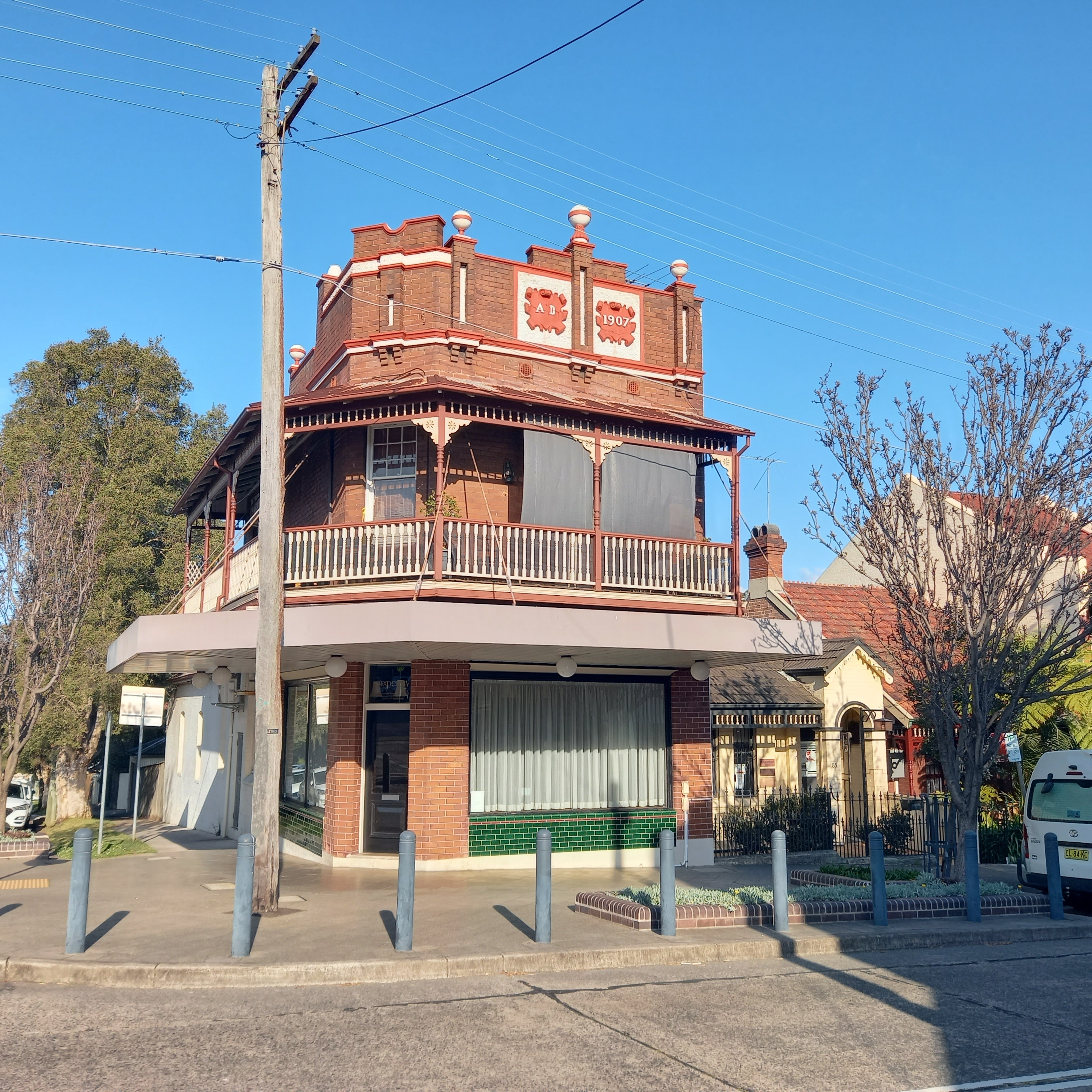
Shopfront, Stanmore; built c. 1907.

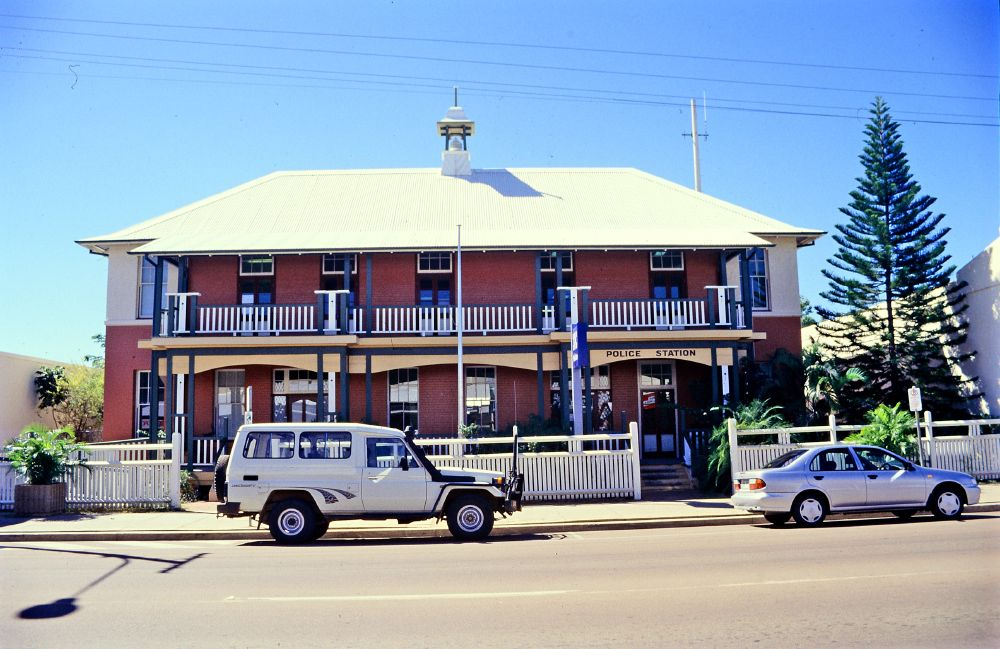
Charters Towers Police Station. Completed 1910; architect, Thomas Pye.

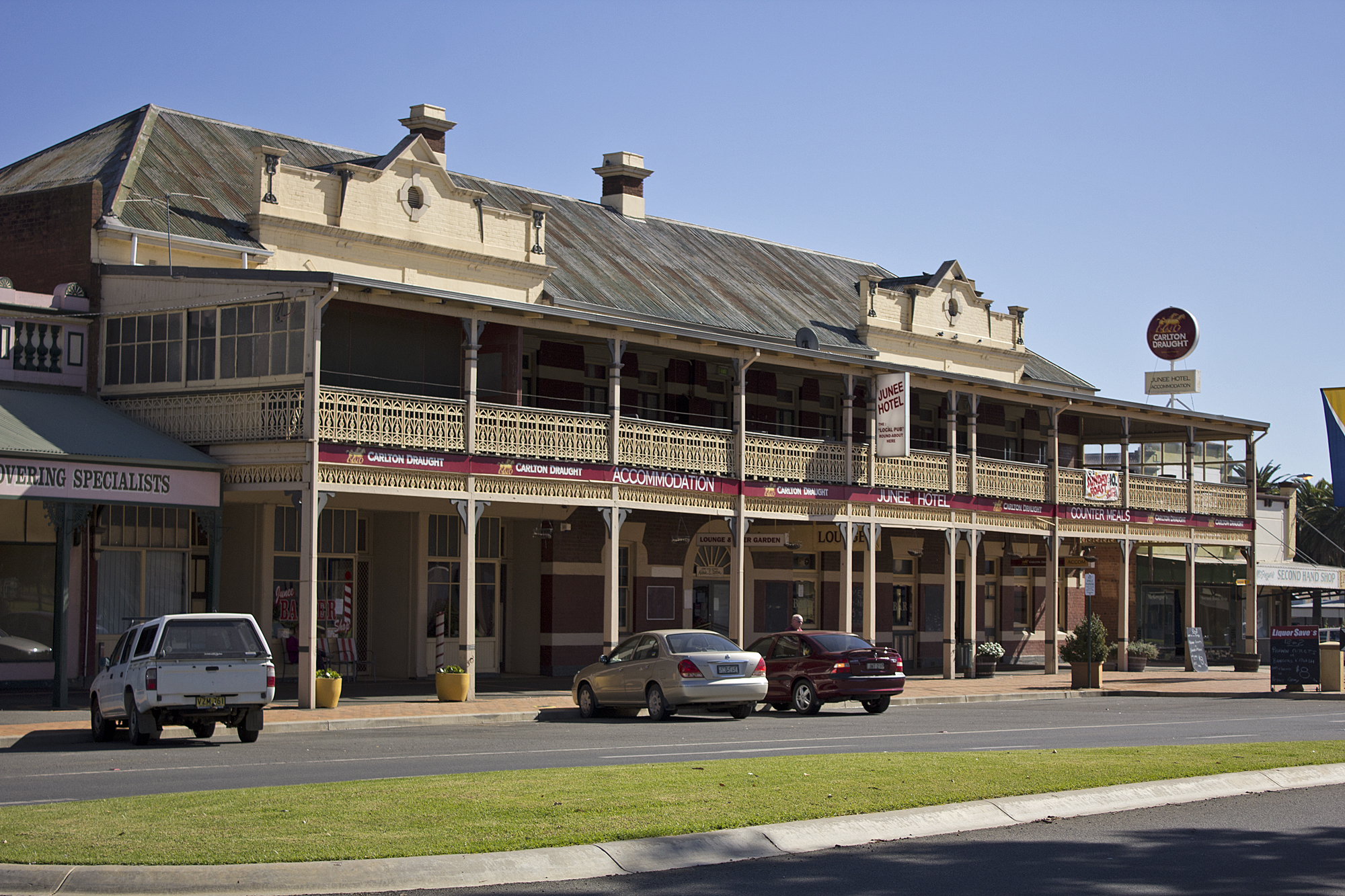
Junee Hotel, Junee; remodeled c. 1911 with art nouveau-style cast ironwork.

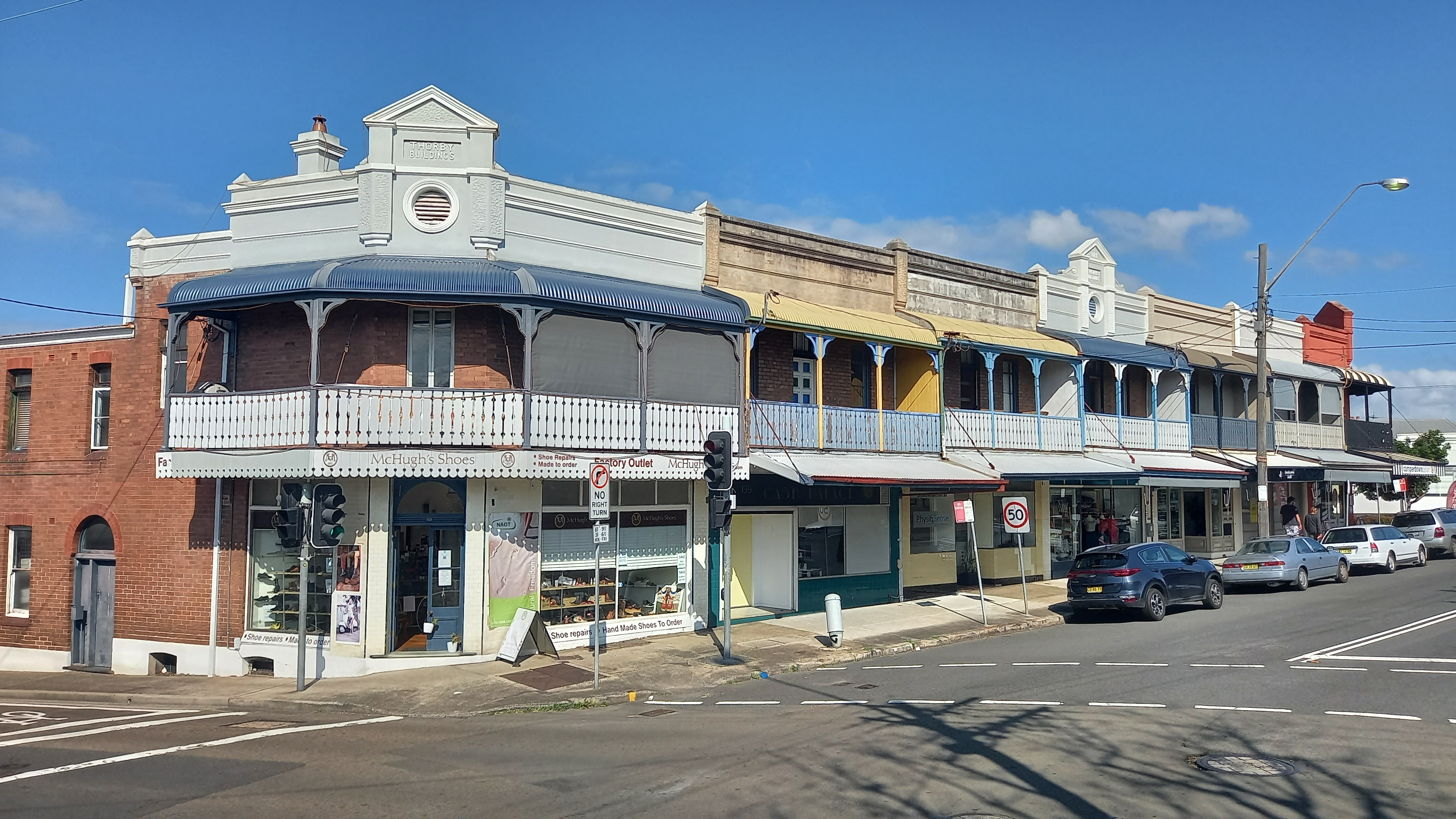
Thorby Buildings, Leichhardt; built 1912; a Federation Filigree shop-terrace.

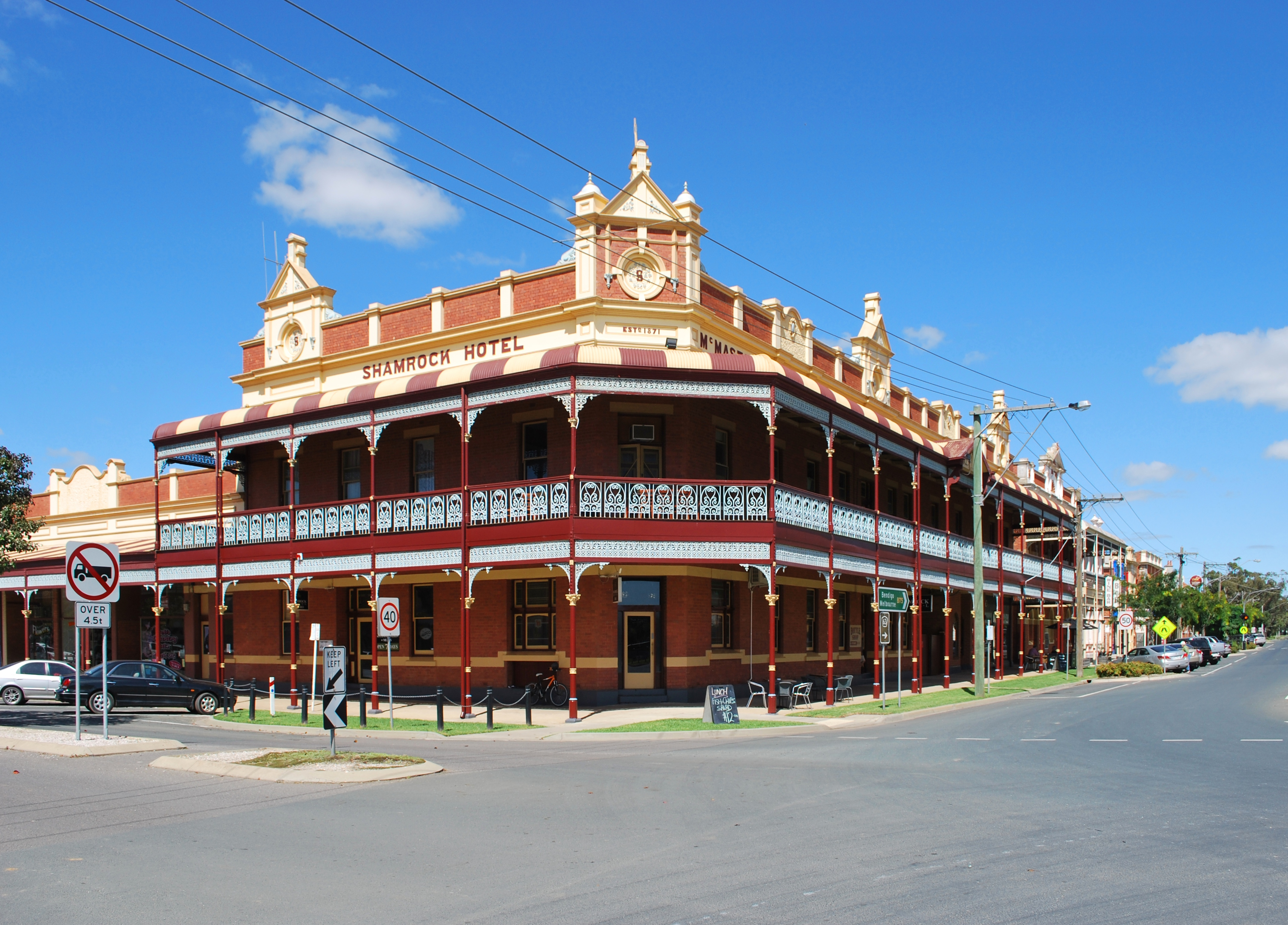
Shamrock Hotel, Rochester; built c.1912.

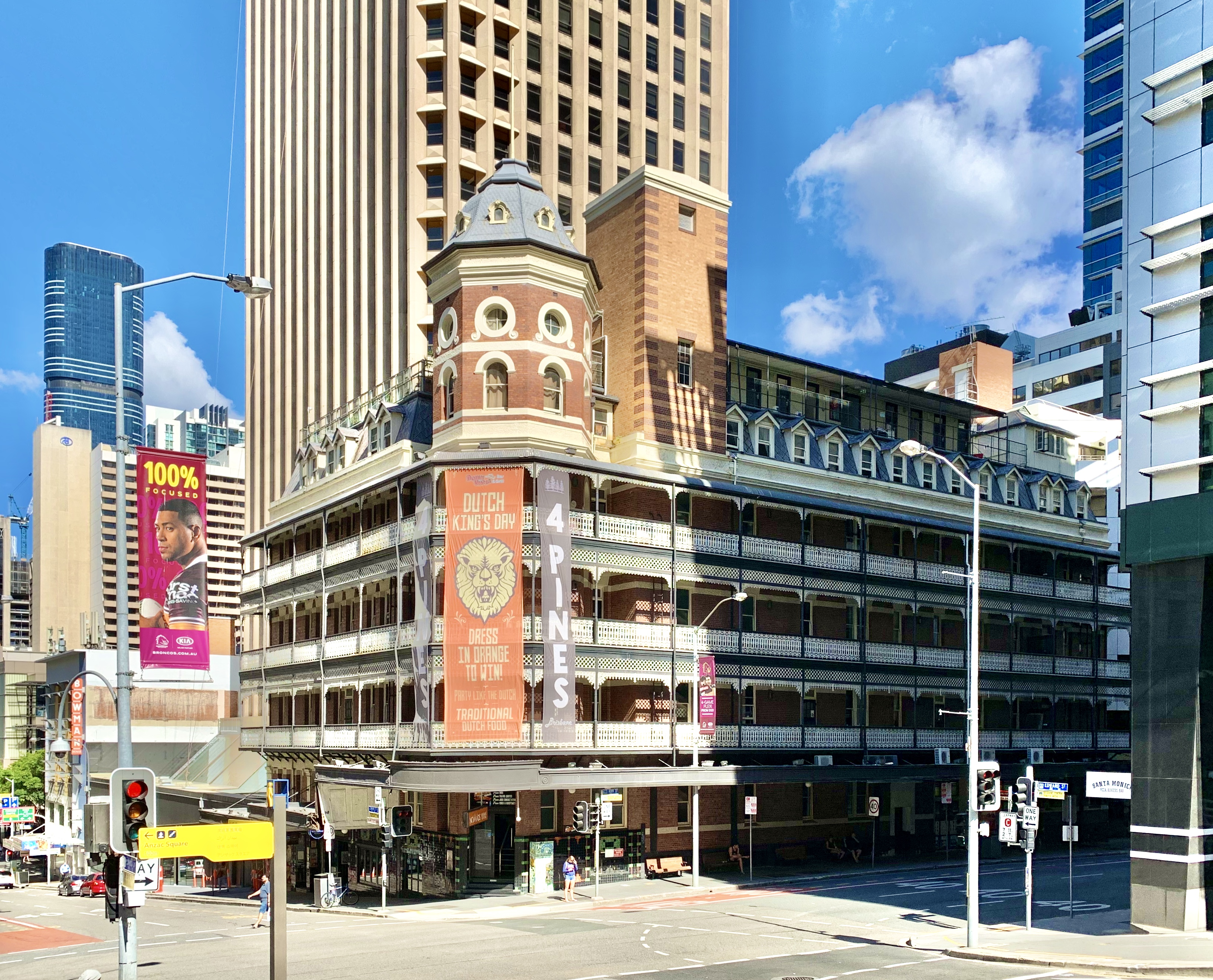
People's Palace, Brisbane, Queensland; Temperance Hotel built in stages between 1910–13.

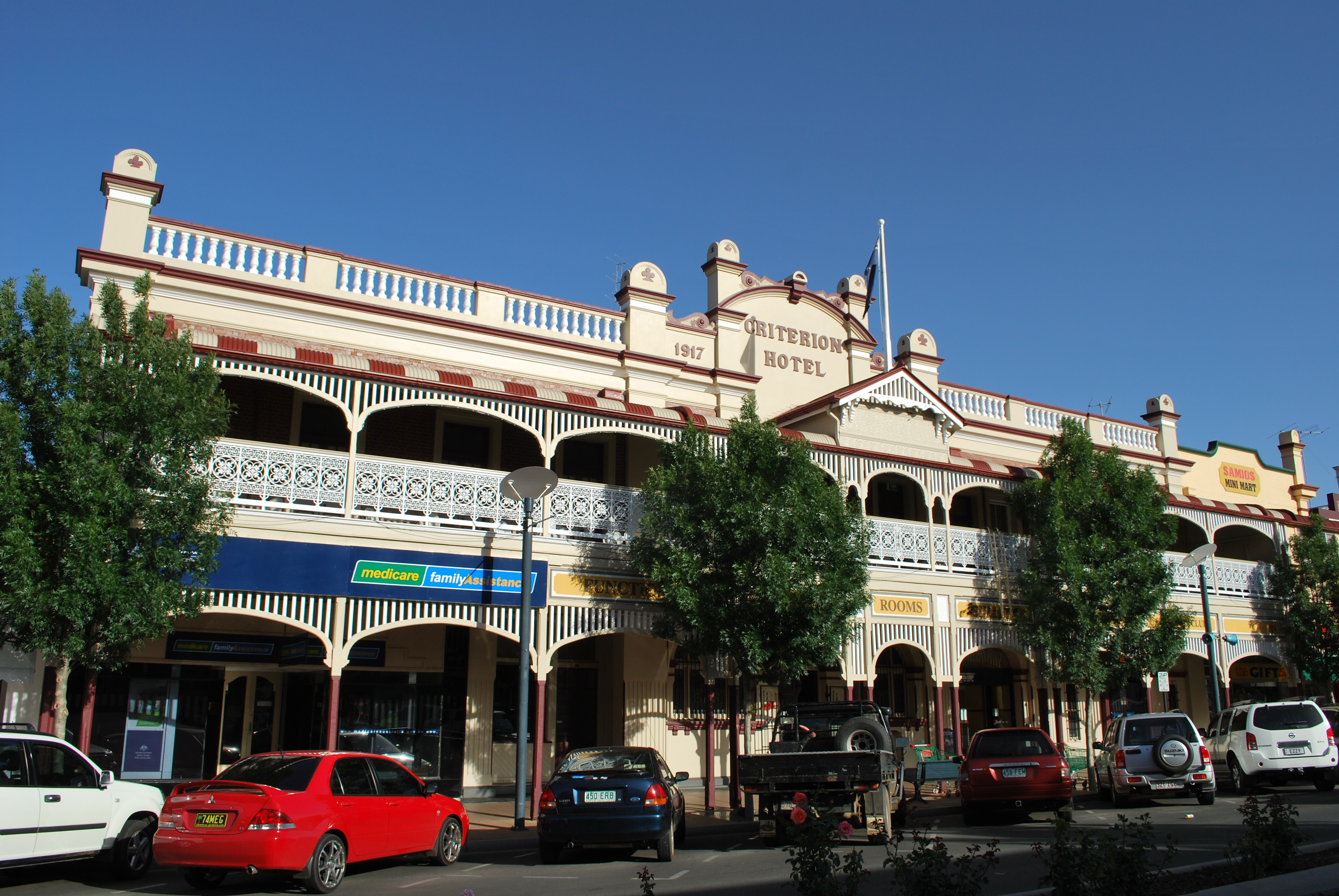
Criterion Hotel, Warwick; built 1917.

=== Federation Anglo-Dutch ===
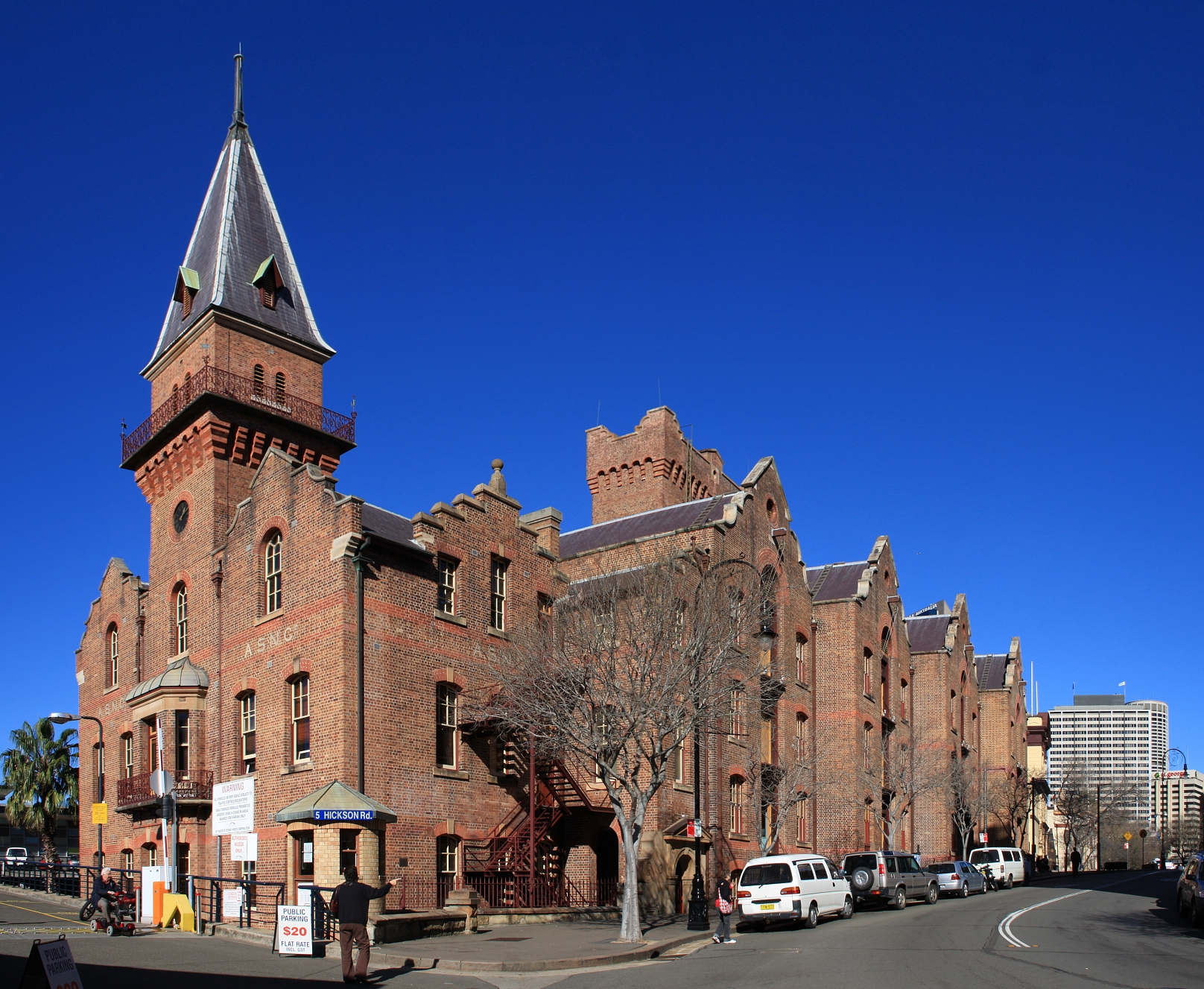
The ASN Co building, Sydney a very early and rare pre-Federation version of the style; completed in 1885

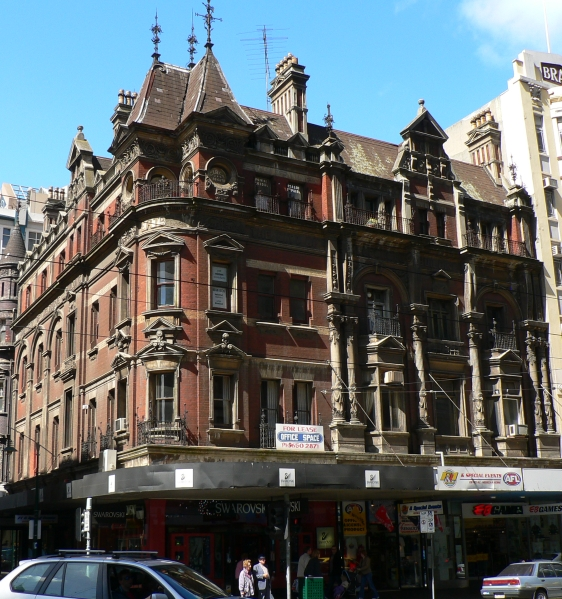
City of Melbourne buildings, Elizabeth Street, Melbourne, a very early example of the style; completed in 1888

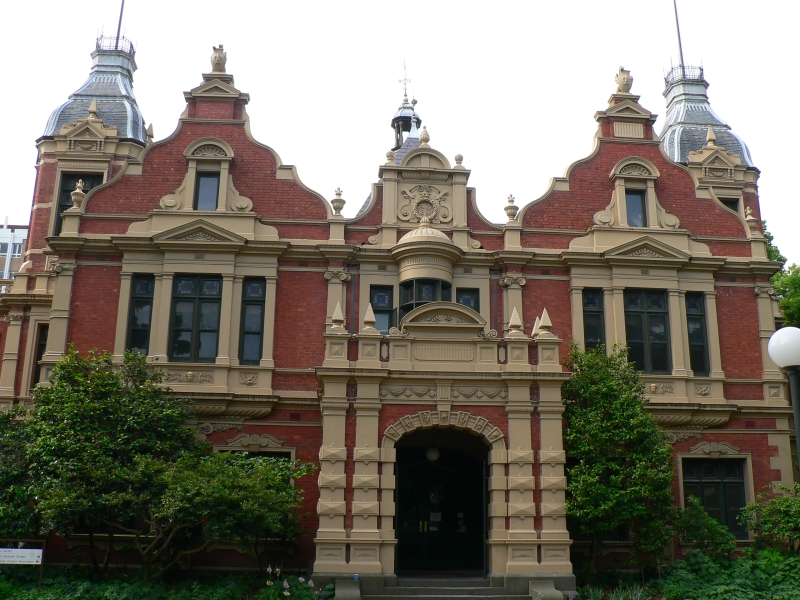
University of Melbourne main buildings, Carlton; completed in 1888

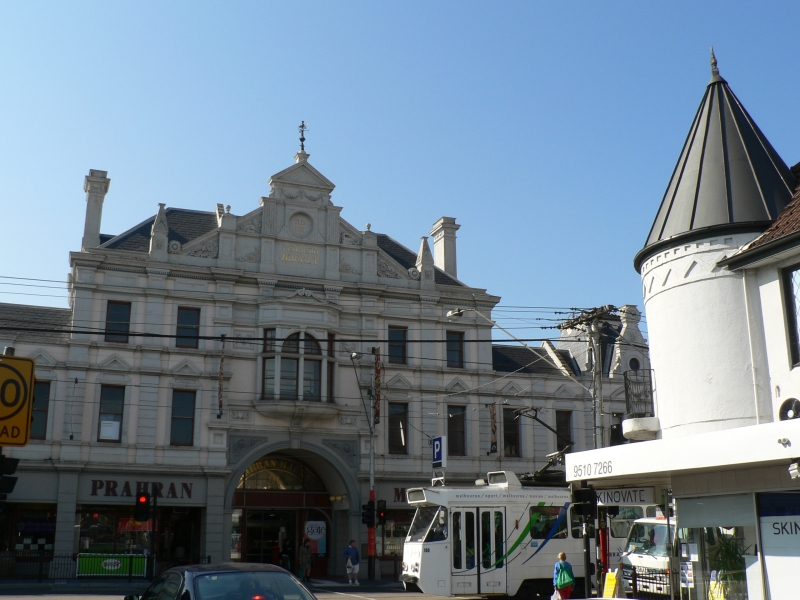
Prahran Market, Prahran; completed in 1891, early Anglo-Dutch

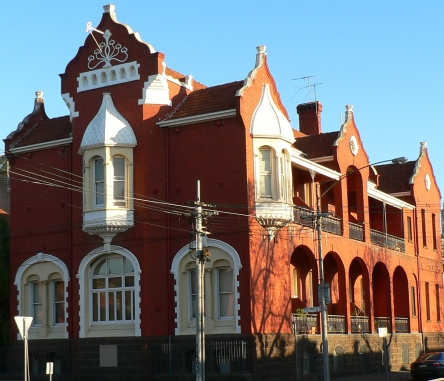
St Nicholas Hospital buildings, Carlton

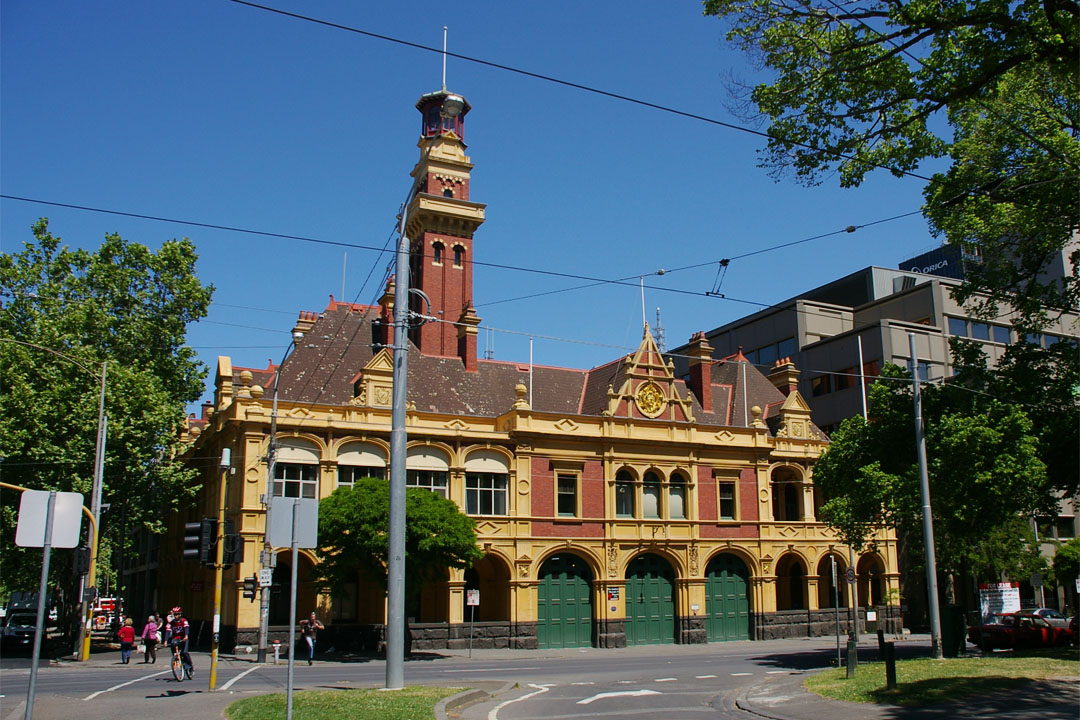
Eastern Hill Fire Station, East Melbourne; completed in 1893

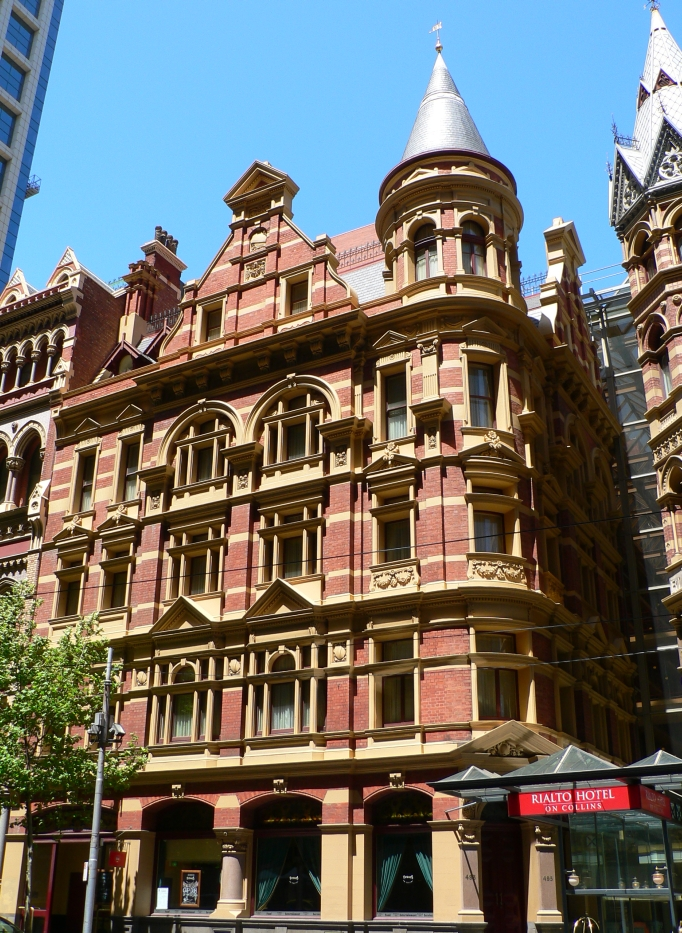
Winfield Building, Collins Street, Melbourne, also demonstrates Queen Anne traits; completed in 1891

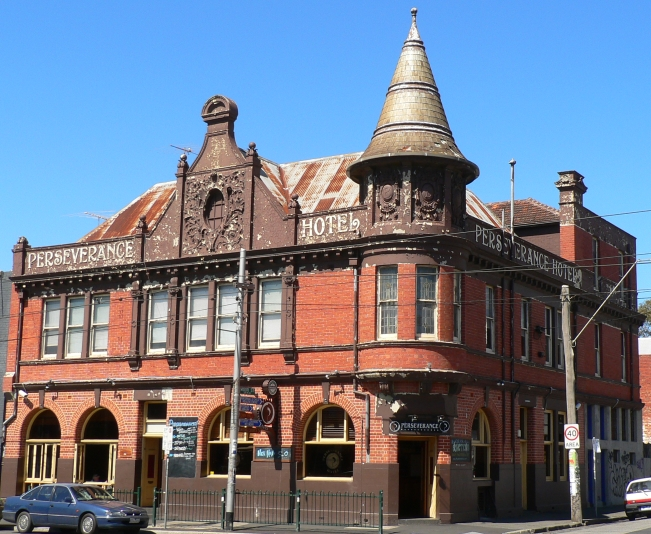
Perseverance Hotel, Fitzroy

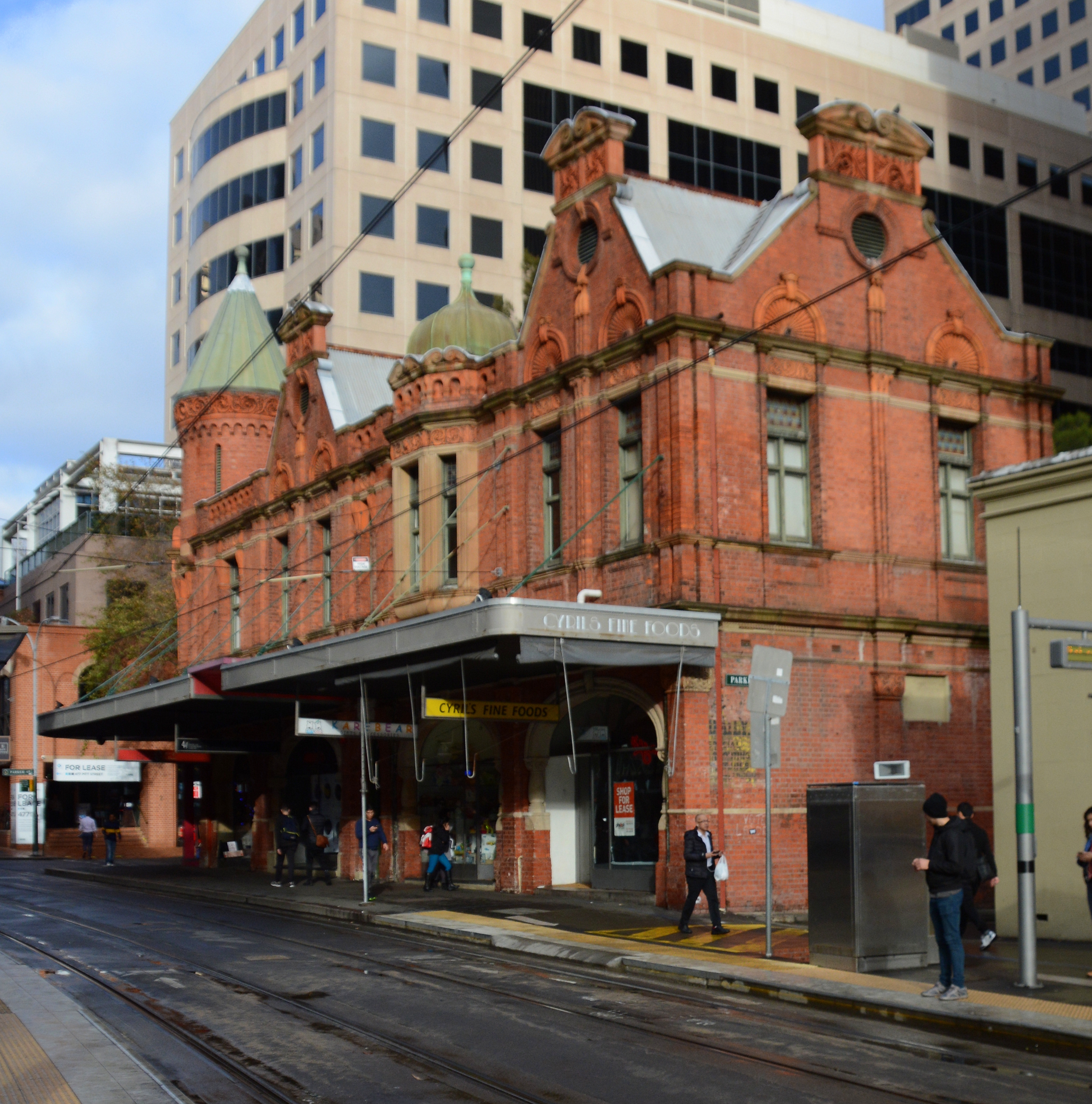
Corporation Building, Haymarket. Completed 1893

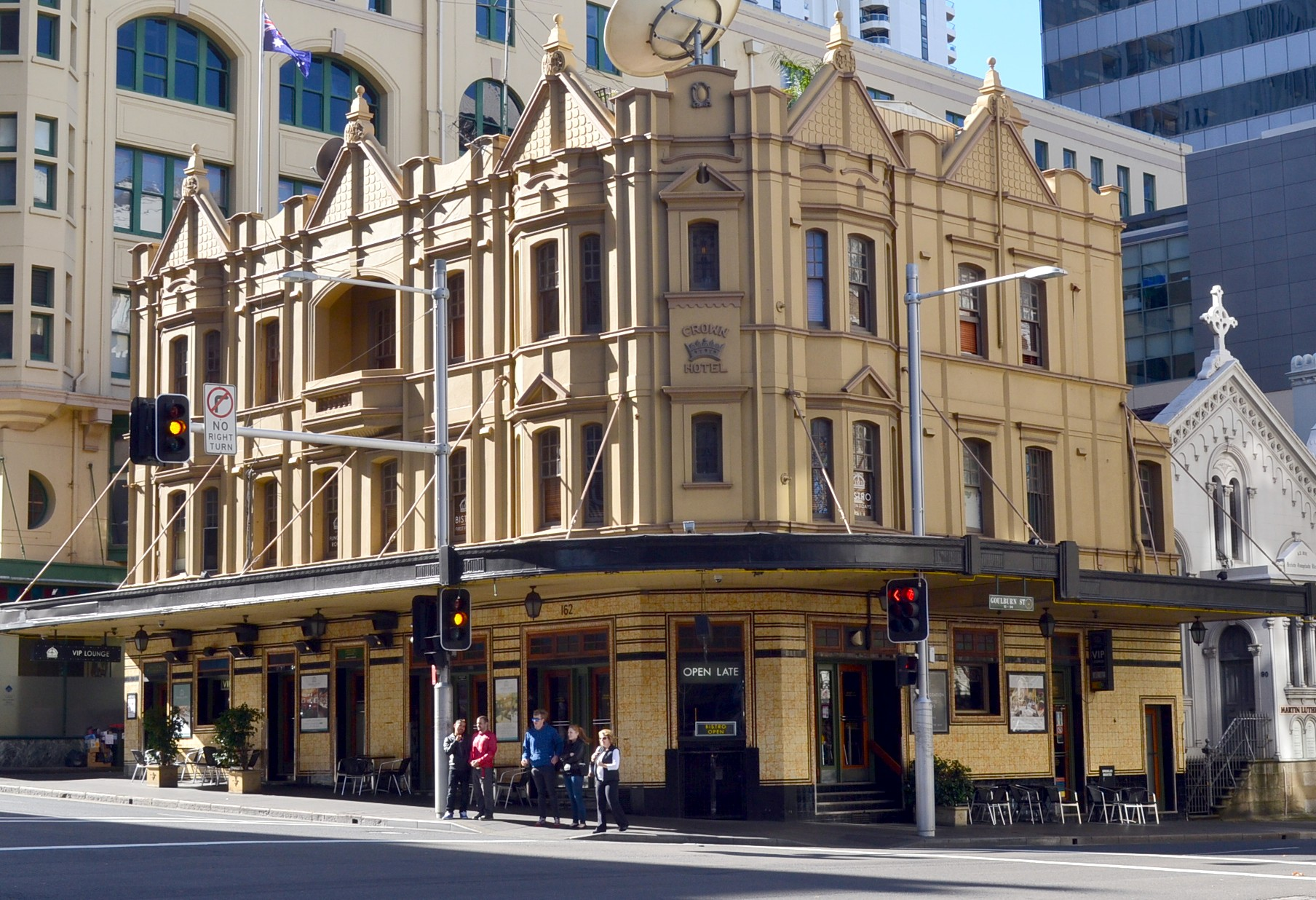
Crown Hotel, Sydney. Completed 1909

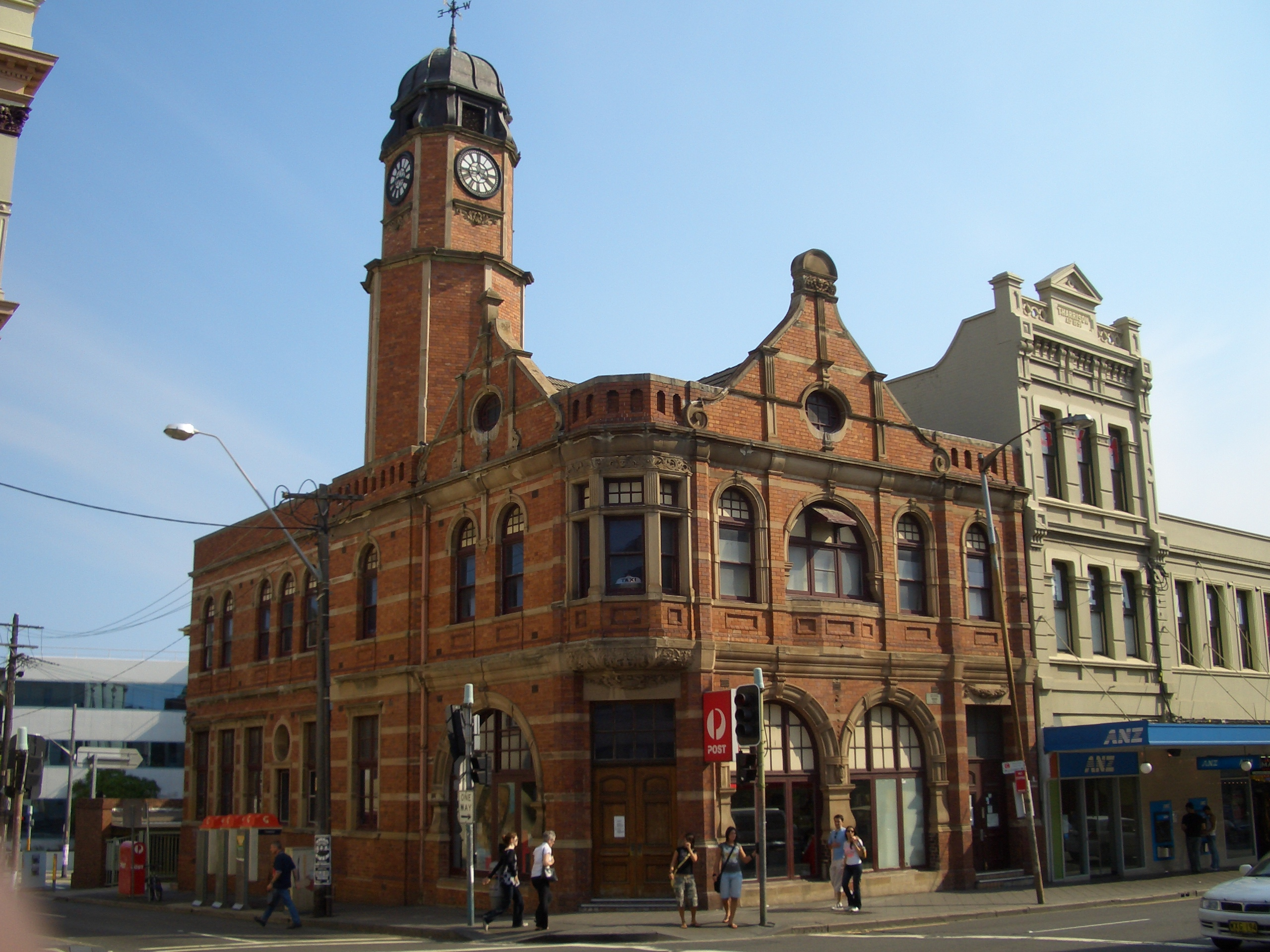
Newtown Post Office, Newtown. Completed 1894

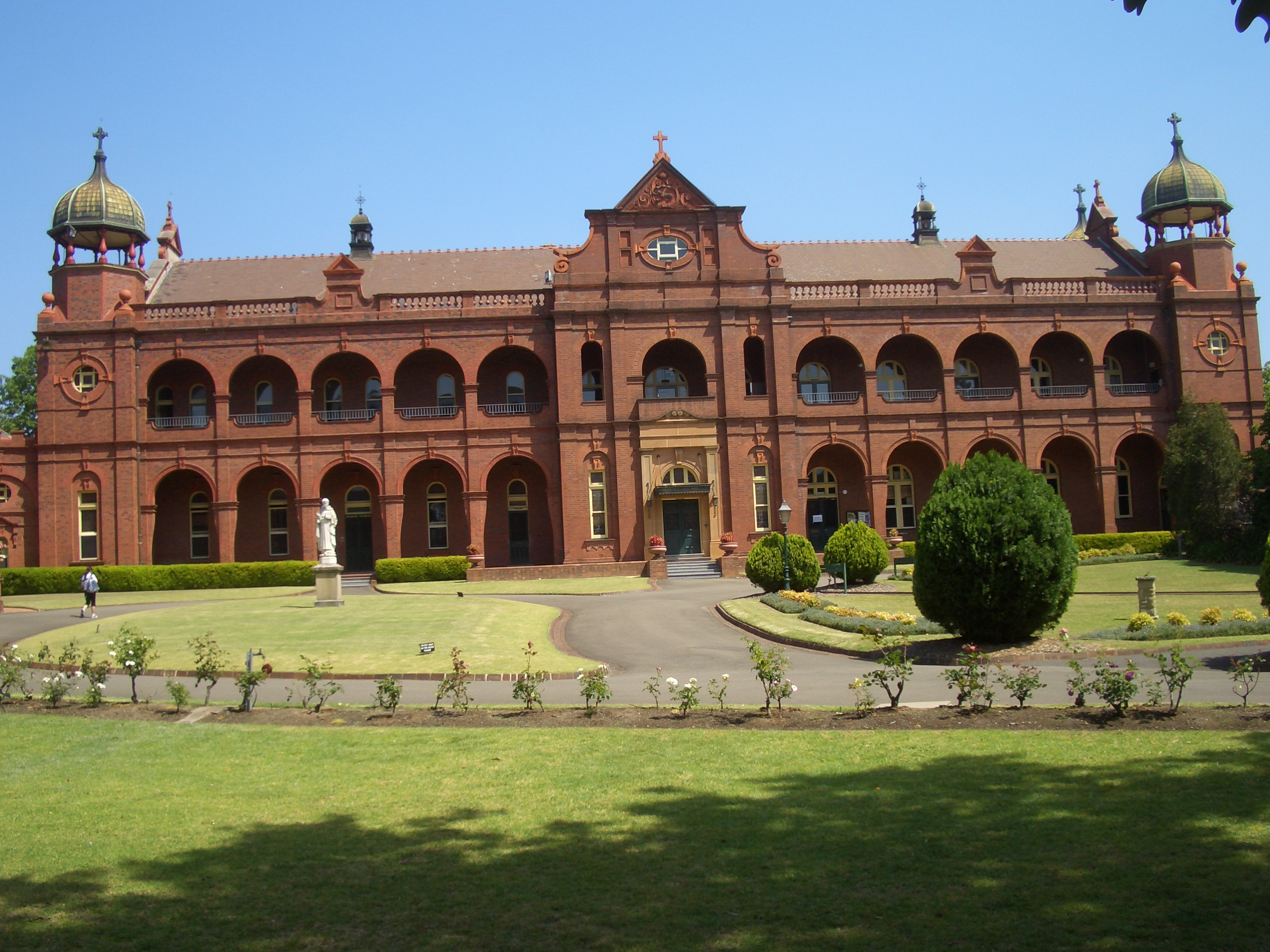
Santa Sabina College, Strathfield. Completed 1894

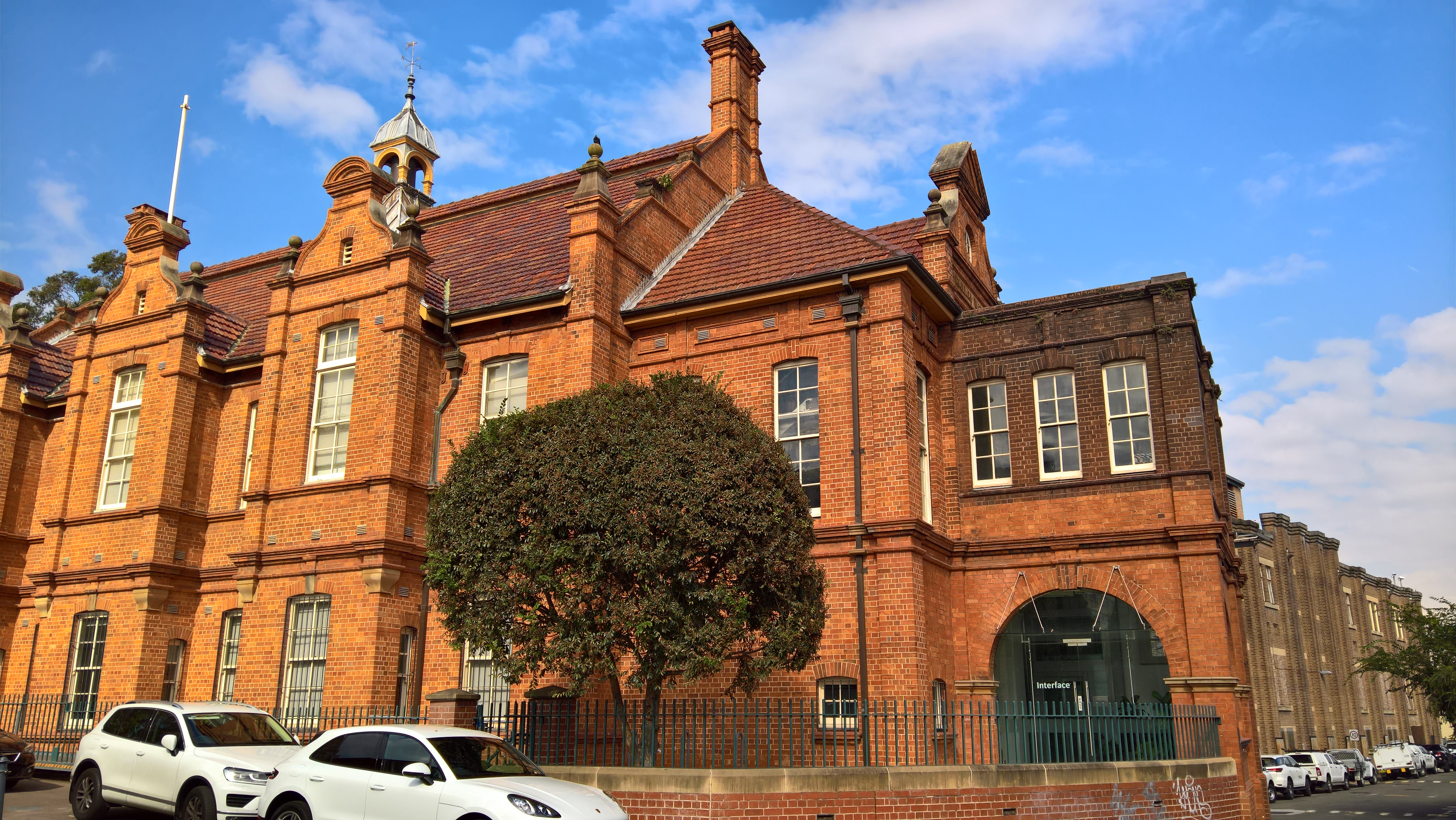
Railway Institute Building, Surry Hills. Completed 1890s

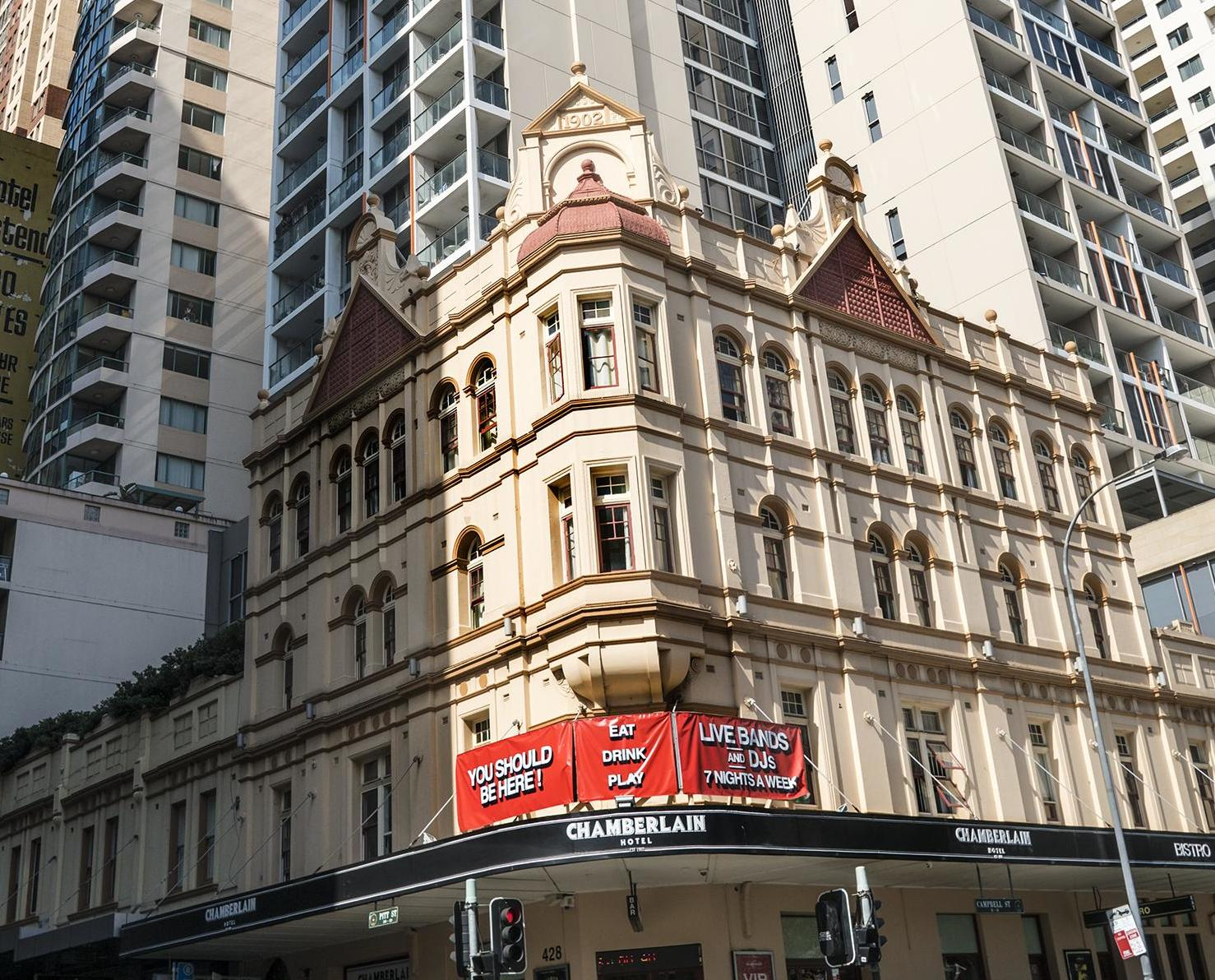
Chamberlain Hotel, Sydney. Completed 1904

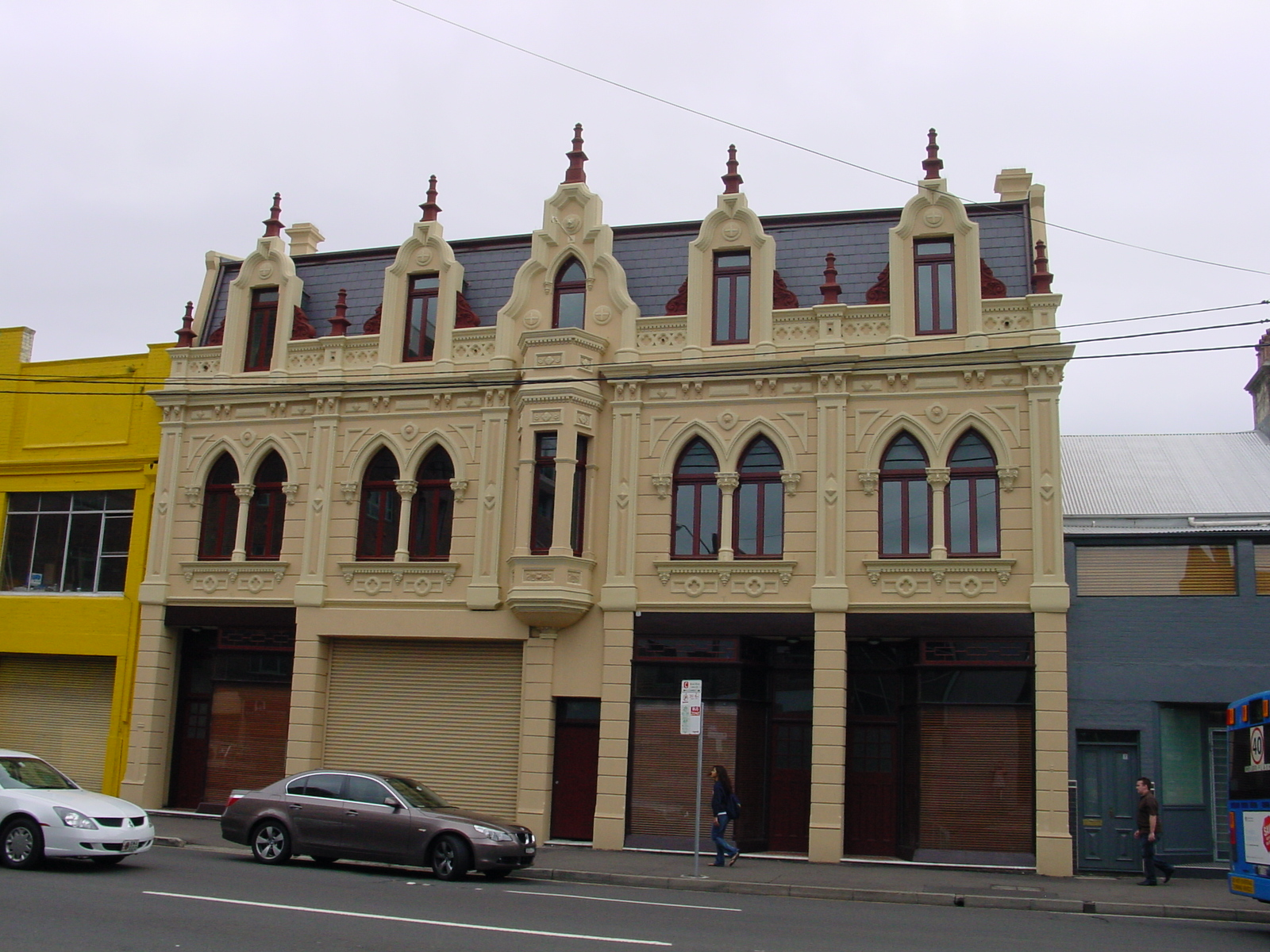
The Trocadero, Newtown. Completed 1889

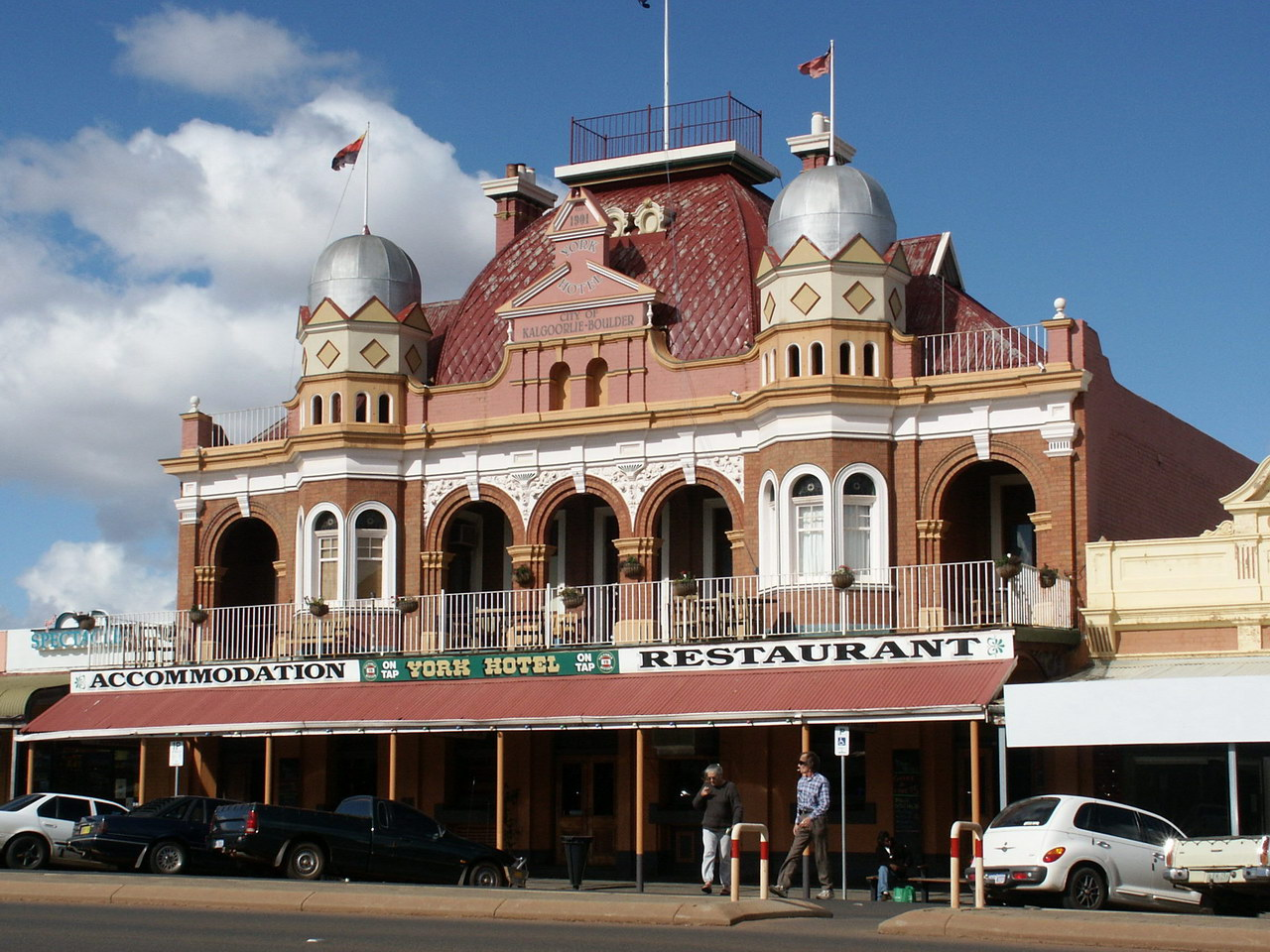
York Hotel, Kalgoorlie. Completed 1901

=== Federation Romanesque ===
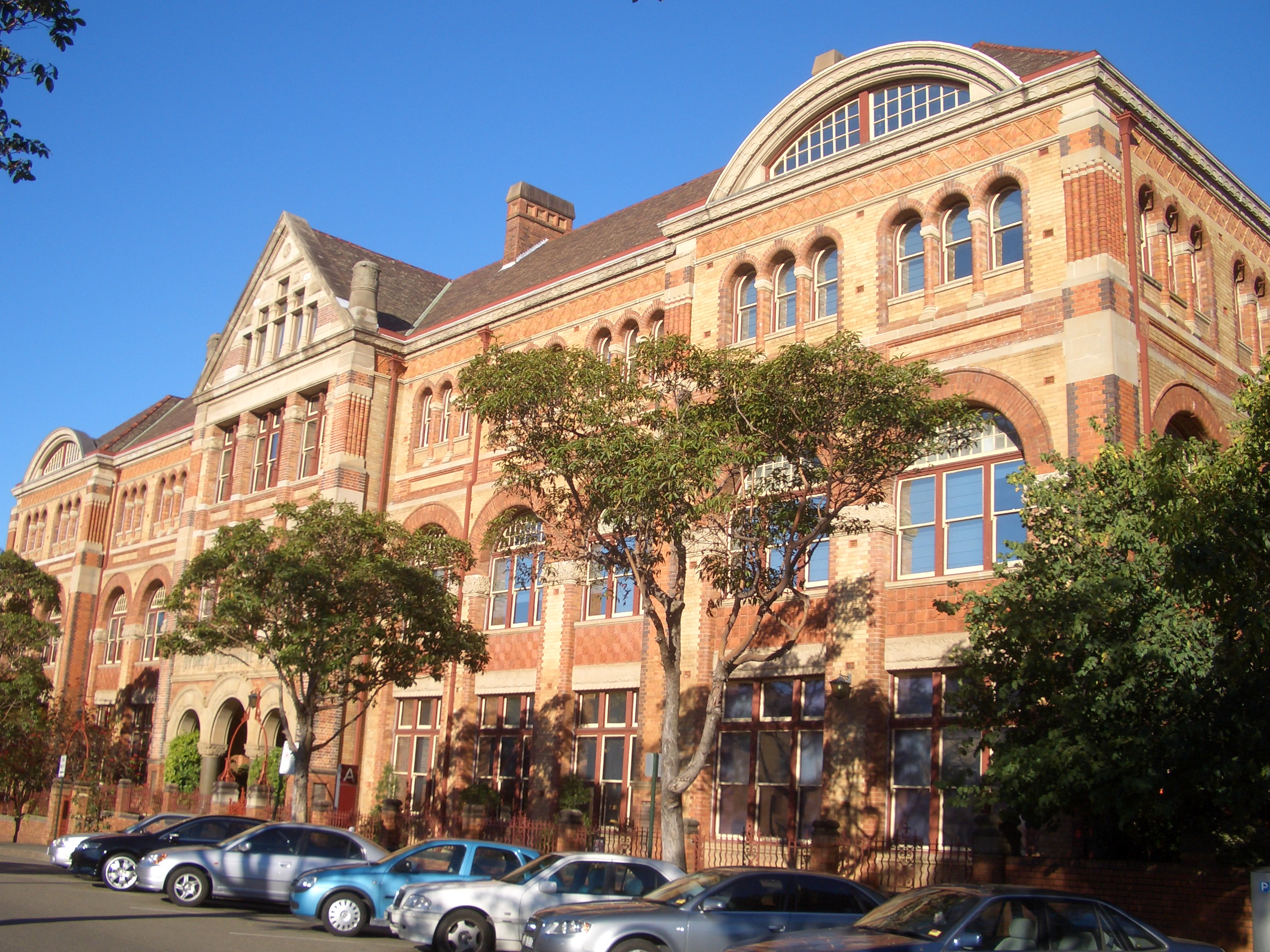
Sydney Technical College (Former Sydney Technical High School building). Completed 1891

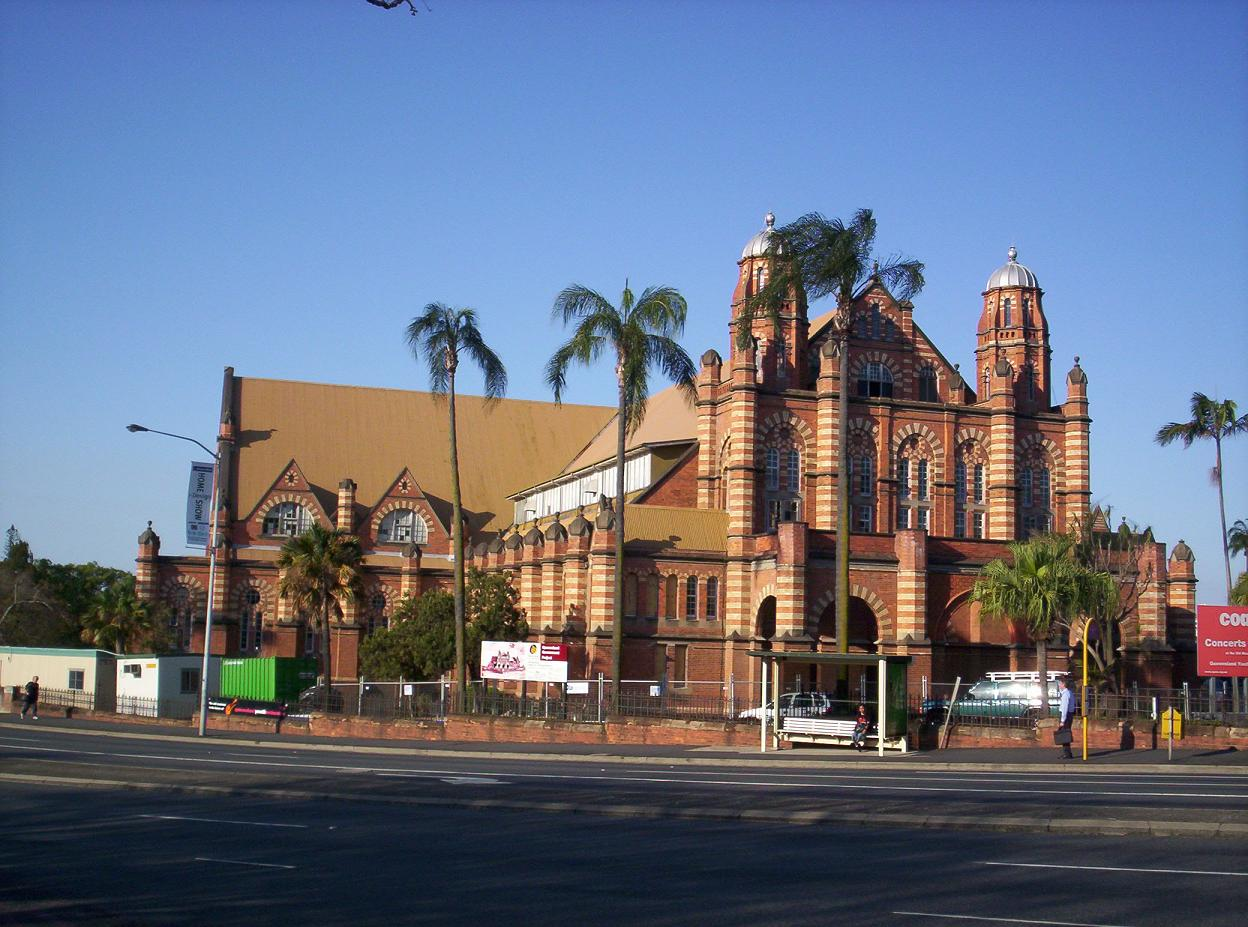
Old Museum Building, Brisbane; completed in 1891.

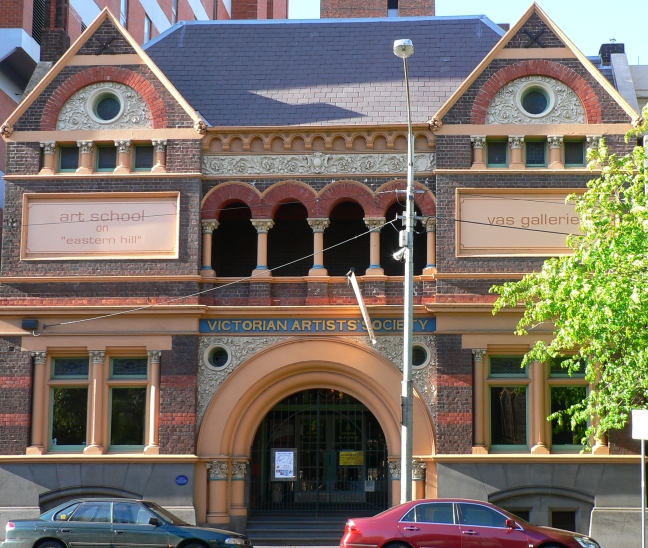
Victorian Artists Society, East Melbourne. Built 1892.

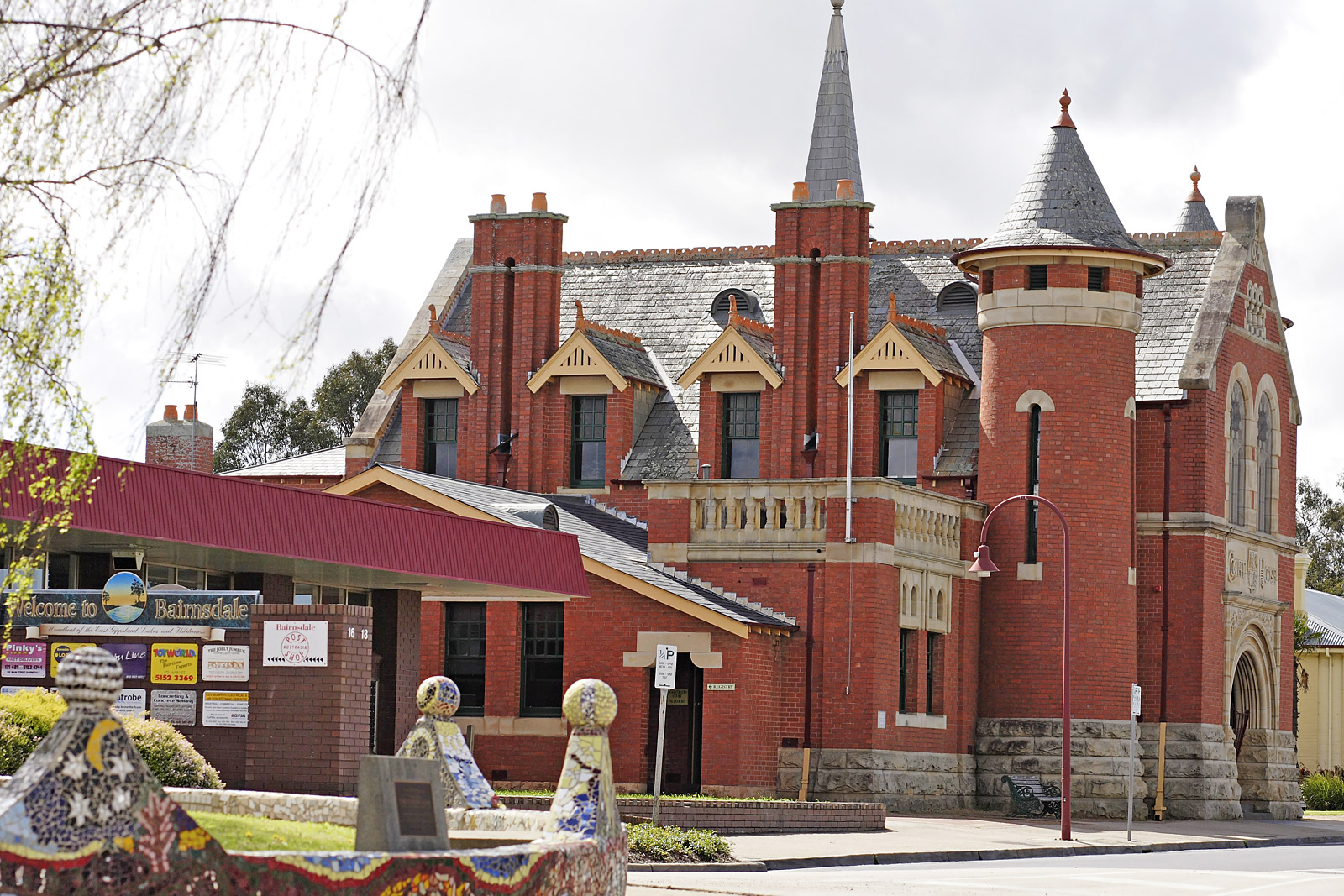
Bairnsdale Court House, Bairnsdale; completed in 1893.

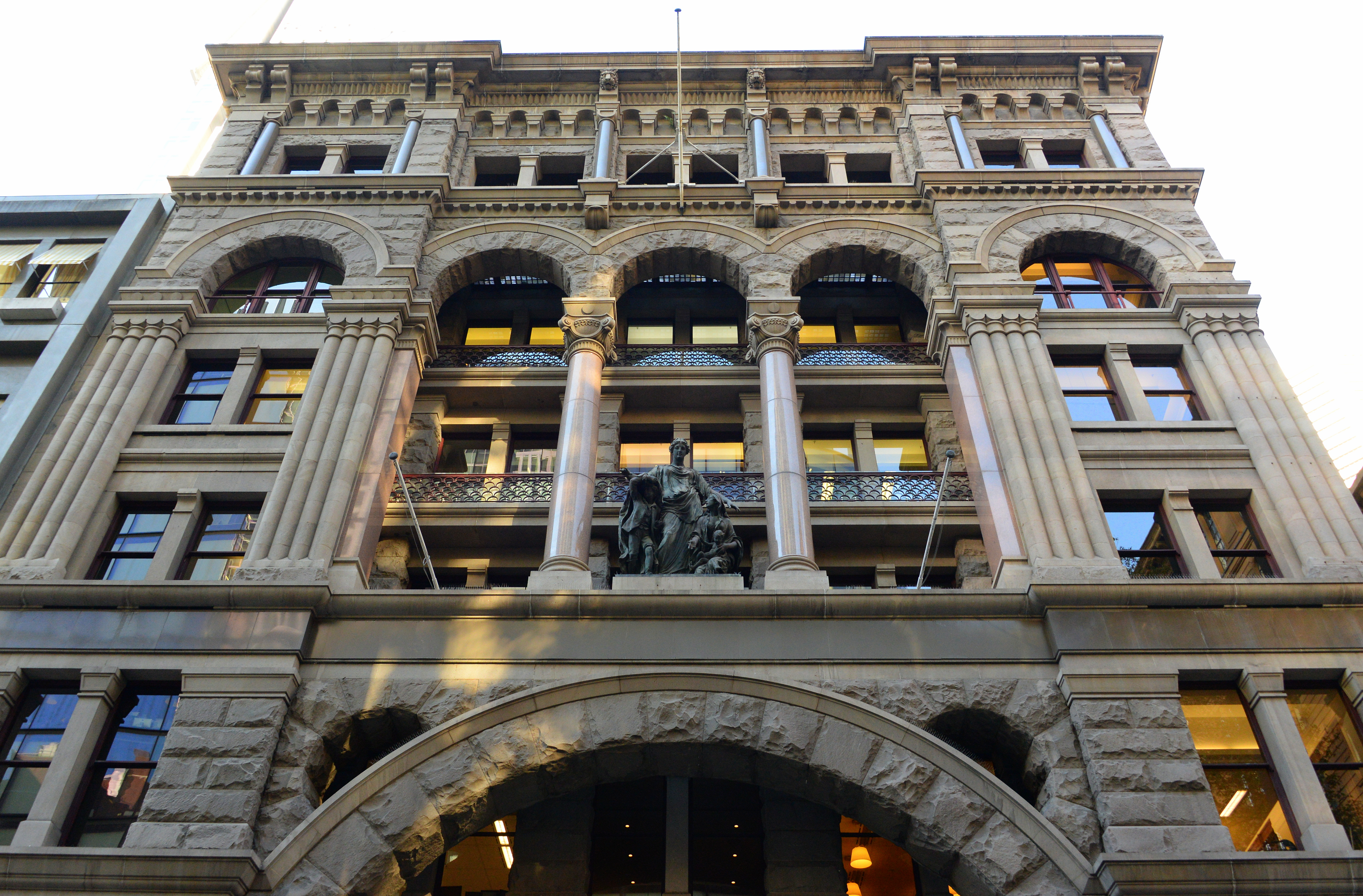
Former Societe Generale Building, Sydney. Completed 1895.

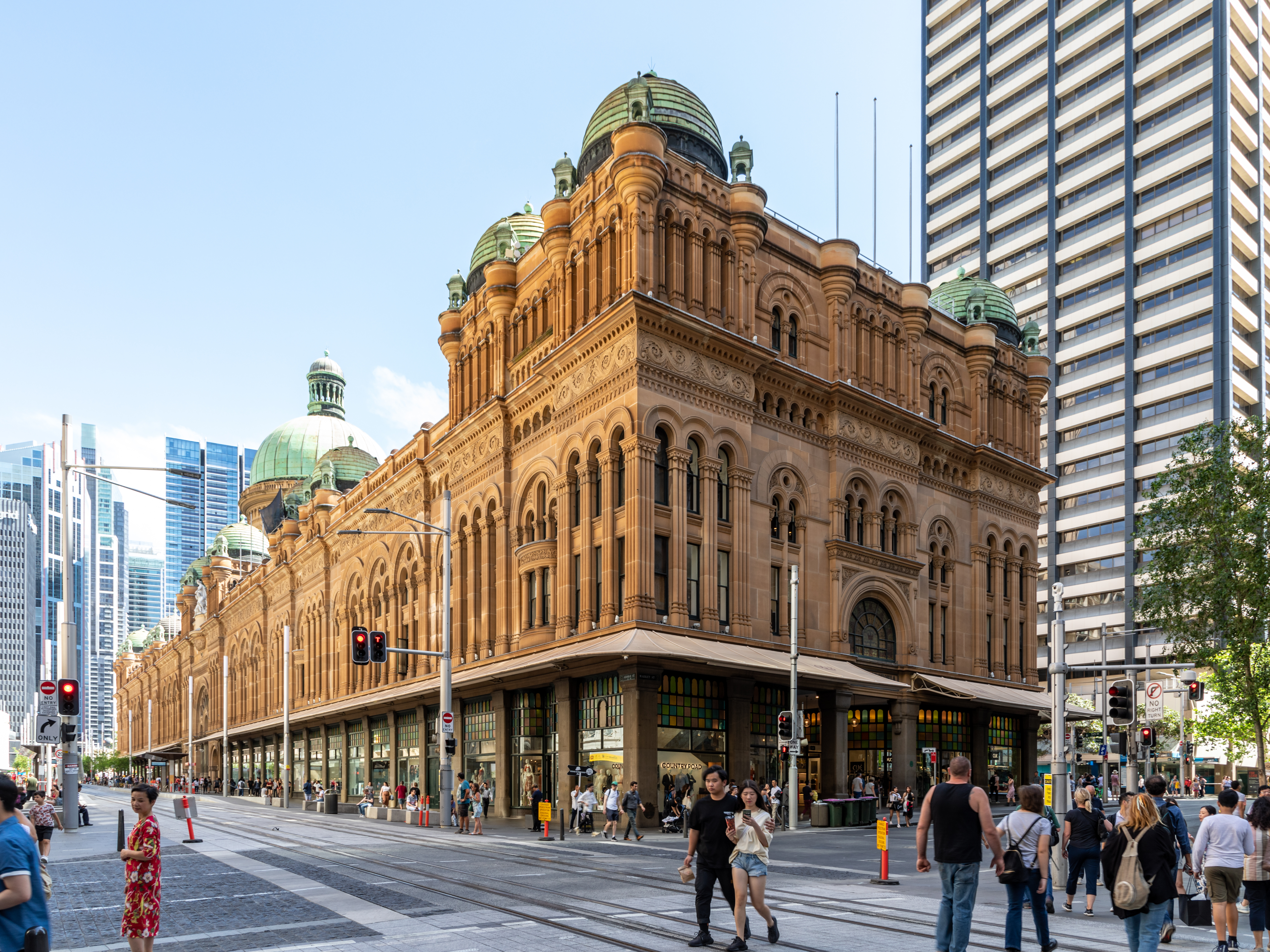
Queen Victoria Building, Sydney; completed in 1898.

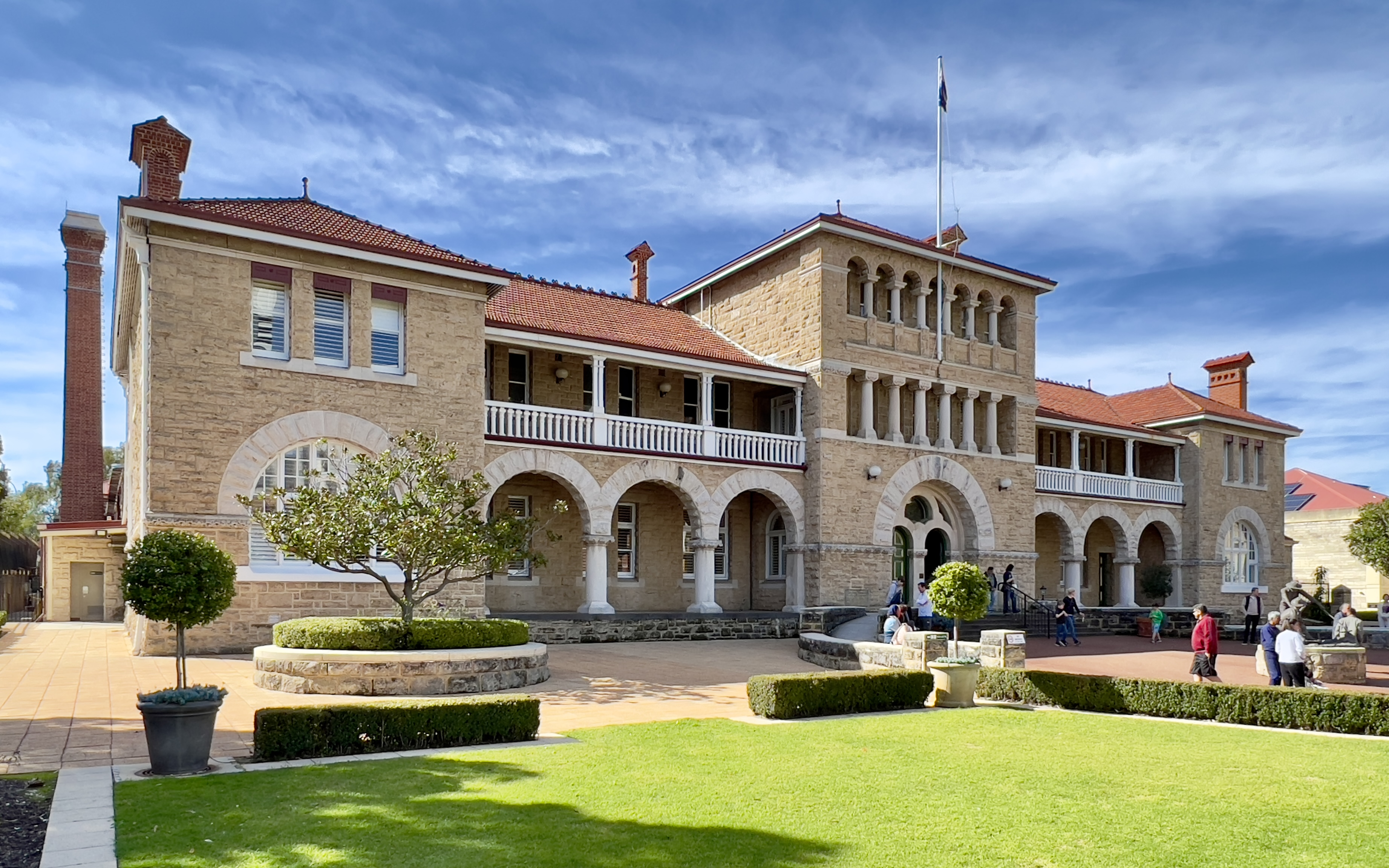
Perth Mint, Perth, completed in 1899

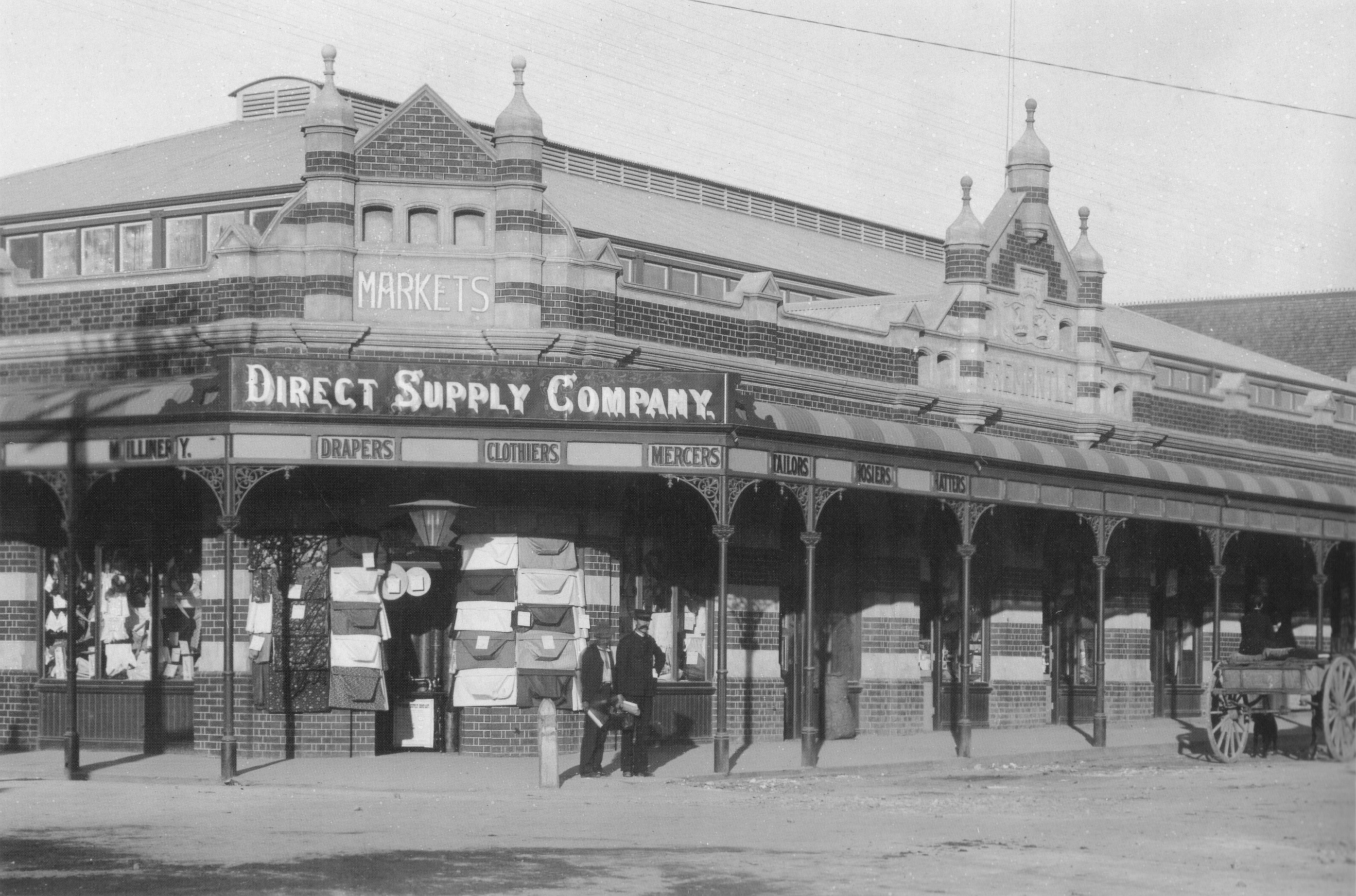
Fremantle Markets, Fremantle; completed in 1902

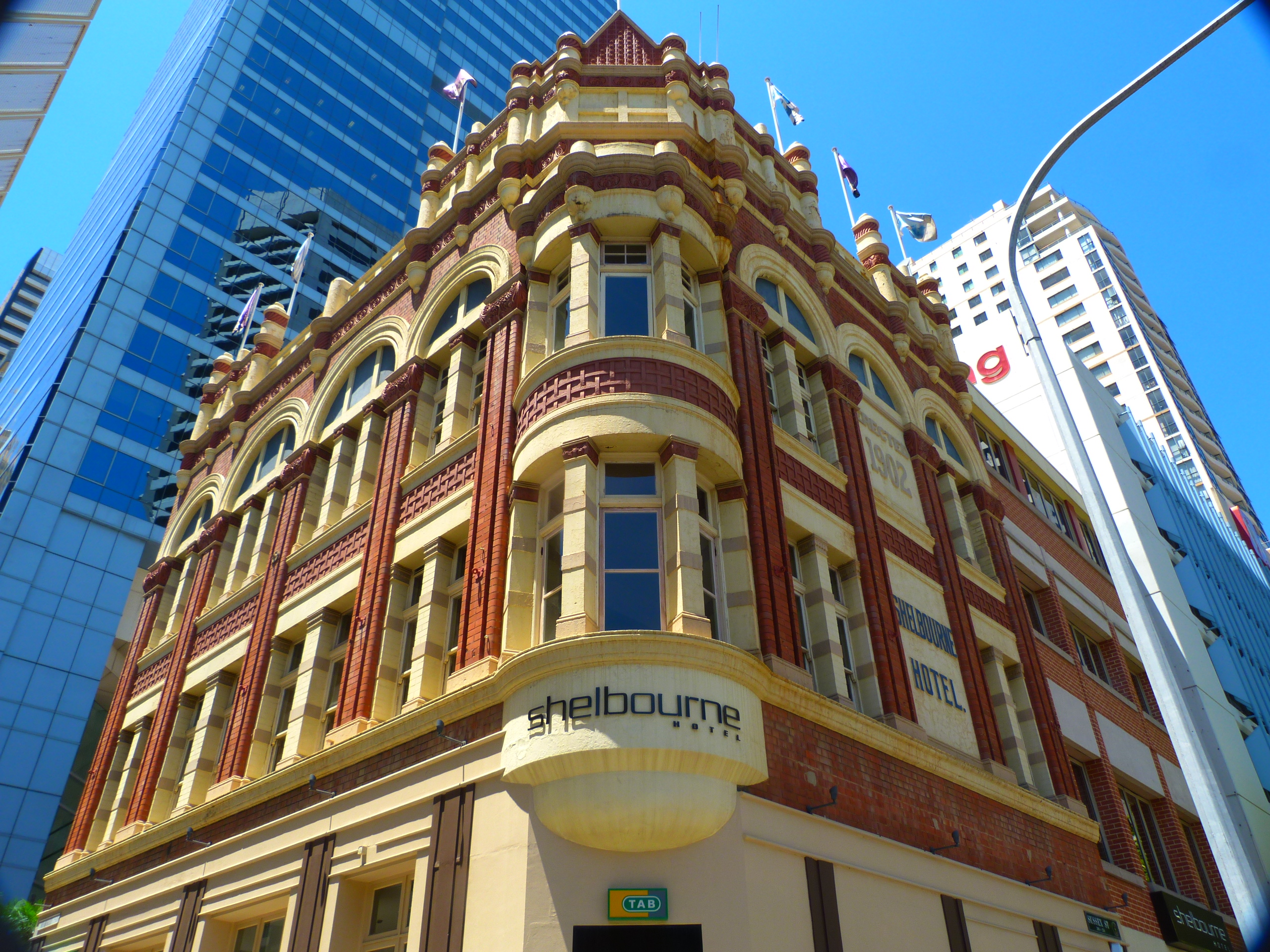
Shelbourne Hotel, Sydney. Completed 1902

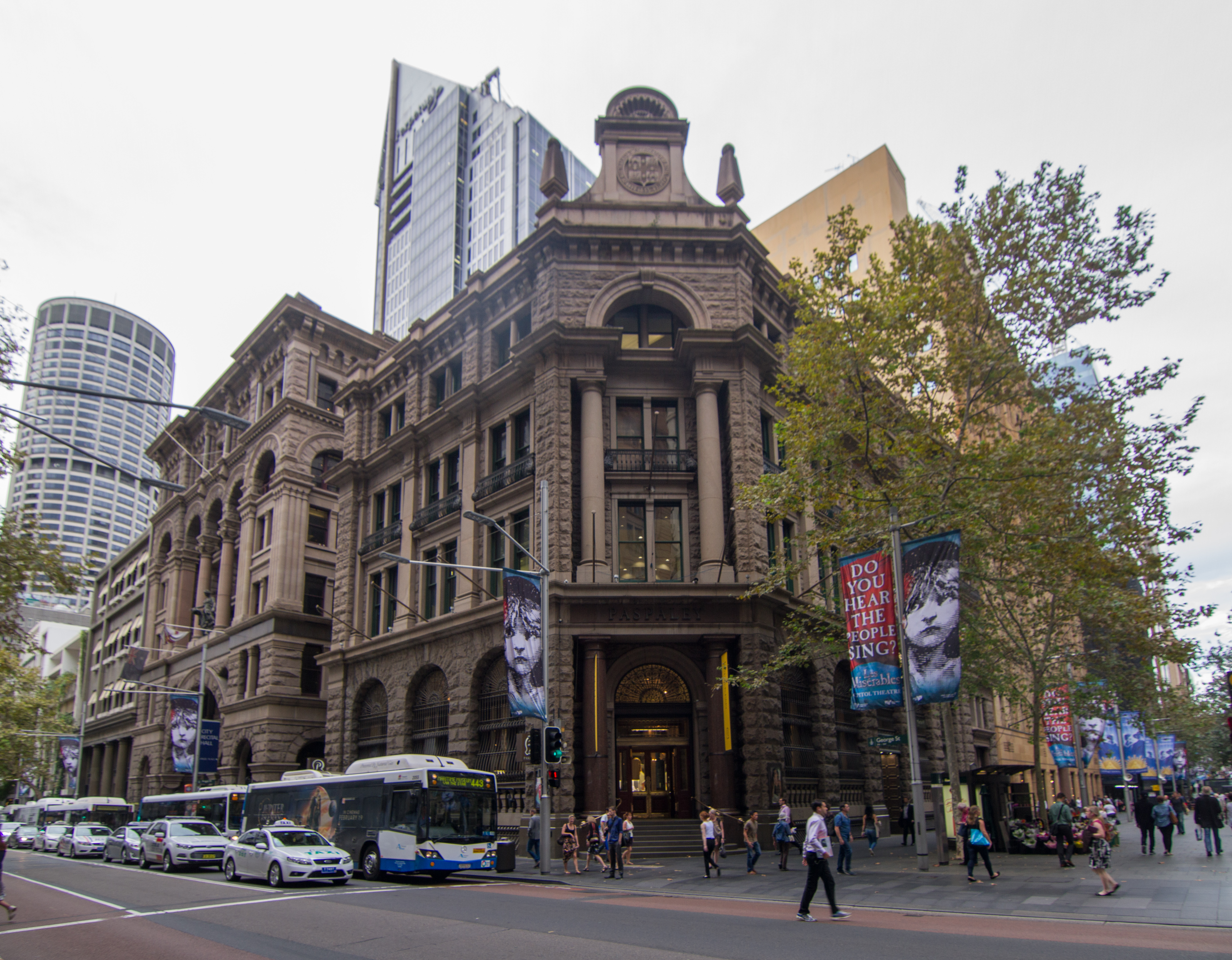
354 George Street, Sydney, Completed 1904

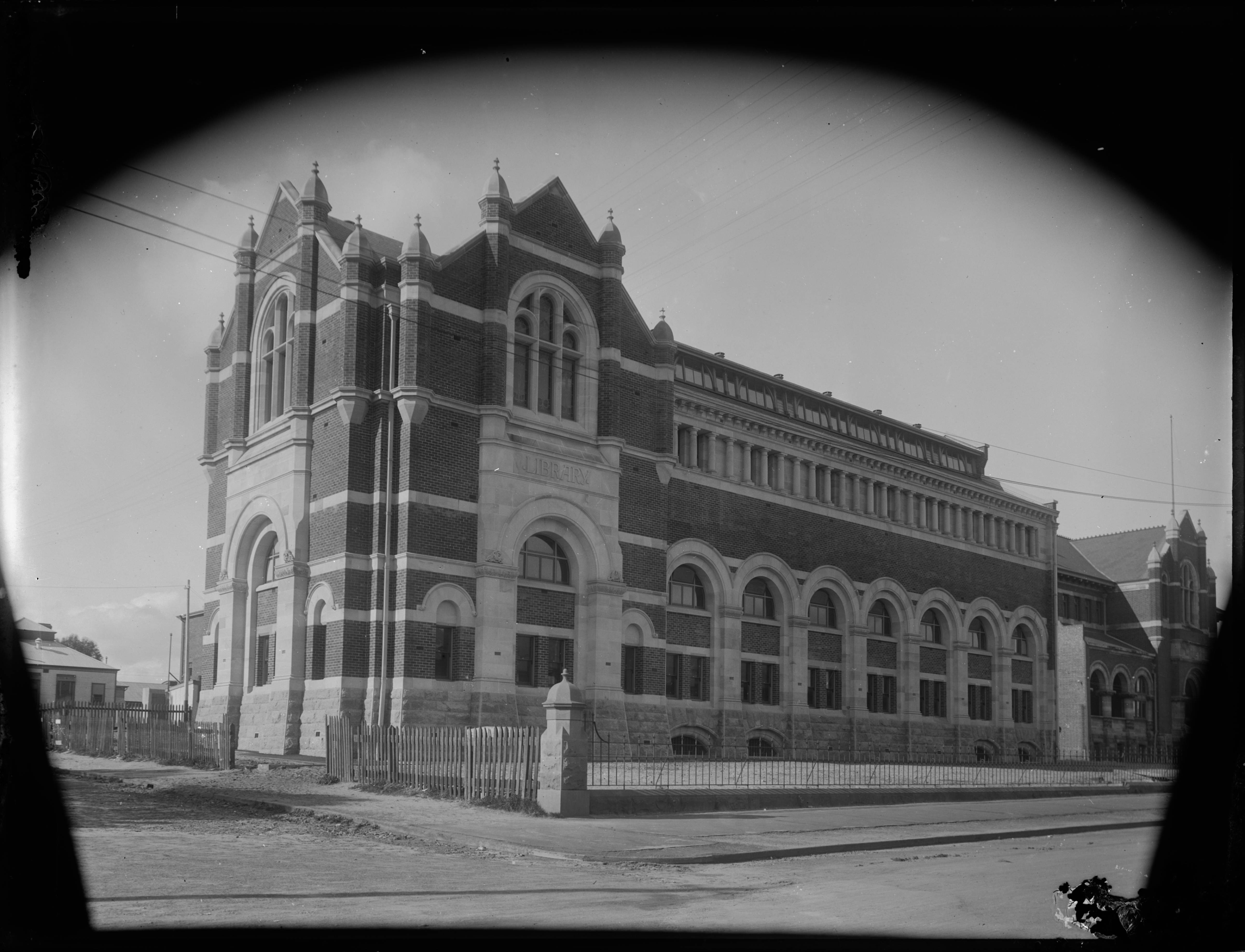
Hackett Hall, Perth; completed 1908, now part of the Western Australian Museum

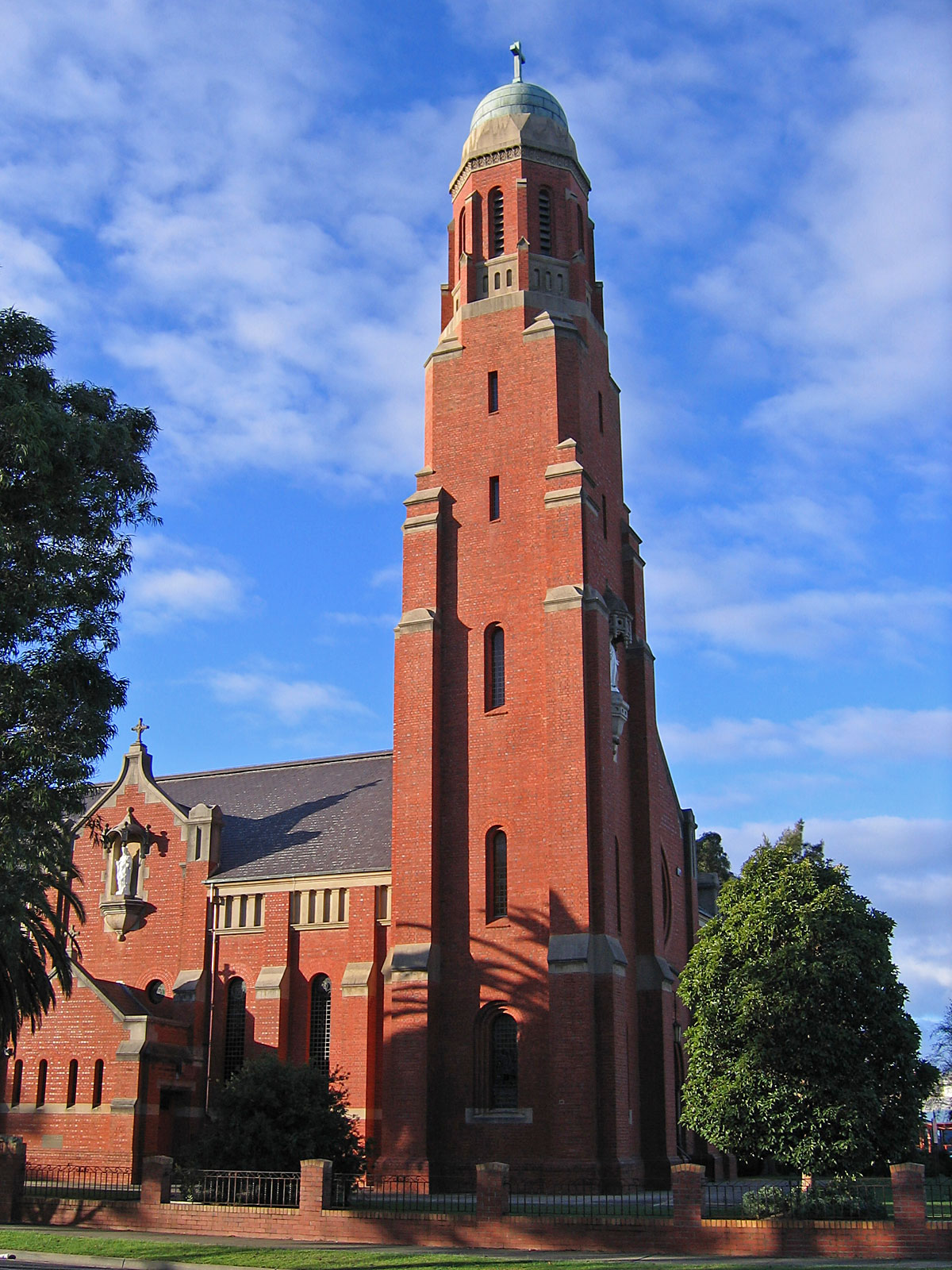
St Mary's Roman Catholic Church, Bairnsdale; completed in 1913

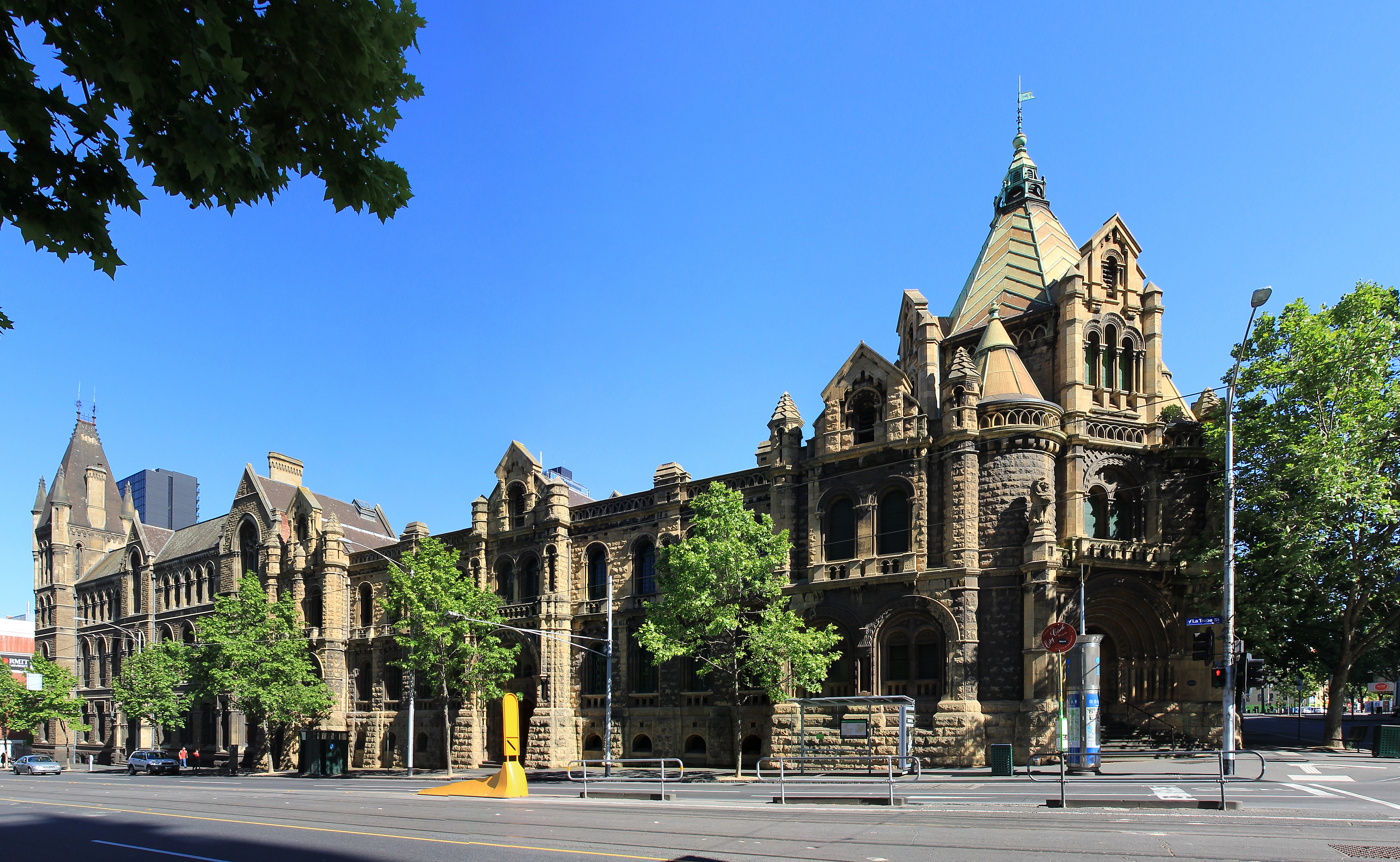
Former Melbourne Magistrates' Court. Completed 1914.

Our Lady of the Victories Basilica, Camberwell; completed in 1918.

=== Federation Gothic ===
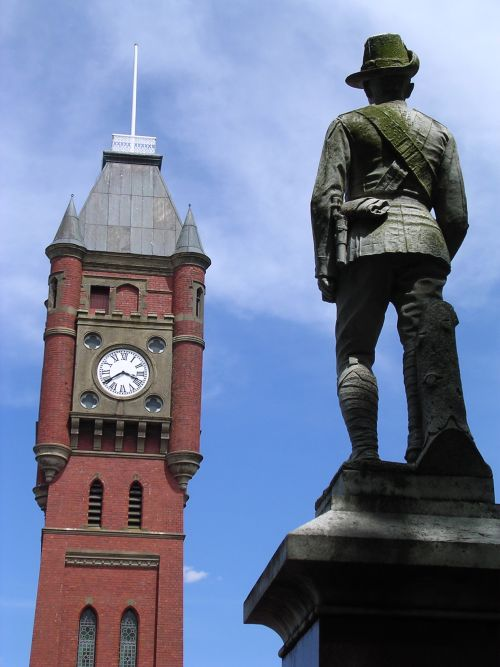
Camperdown Memorial Clock Tower in Camperdown; completed in 1897

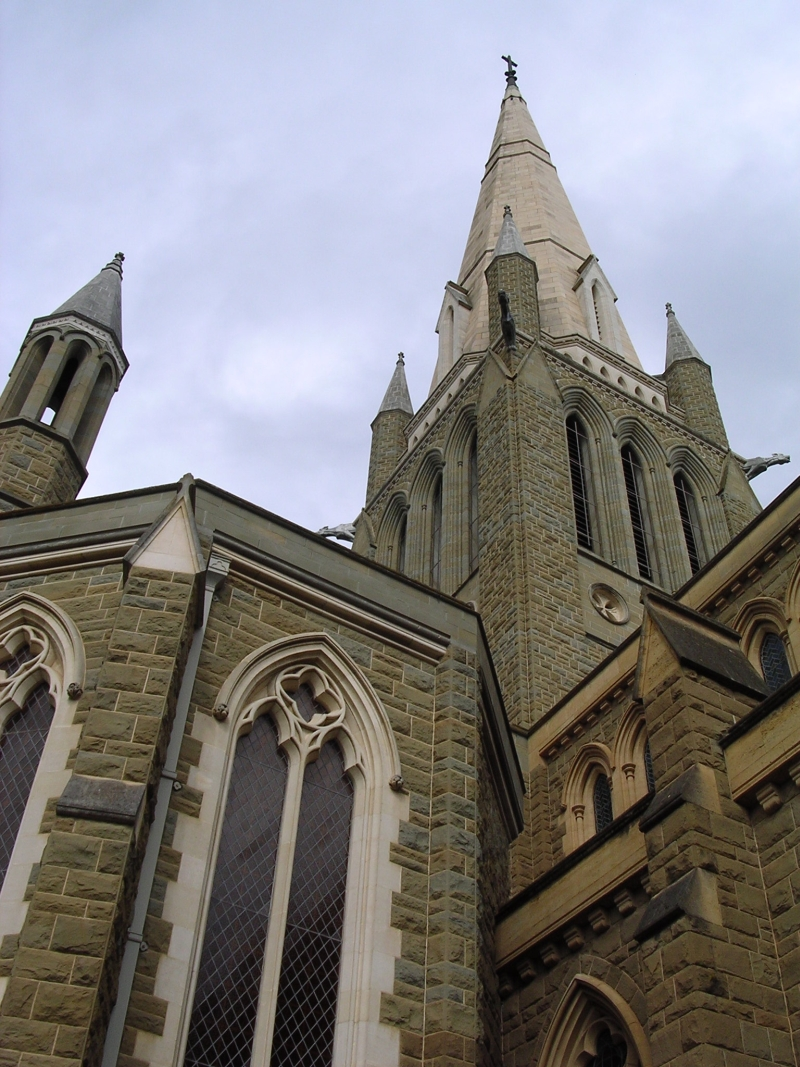
Sacred Heart Cathedral in Bendigo; completed in 1896

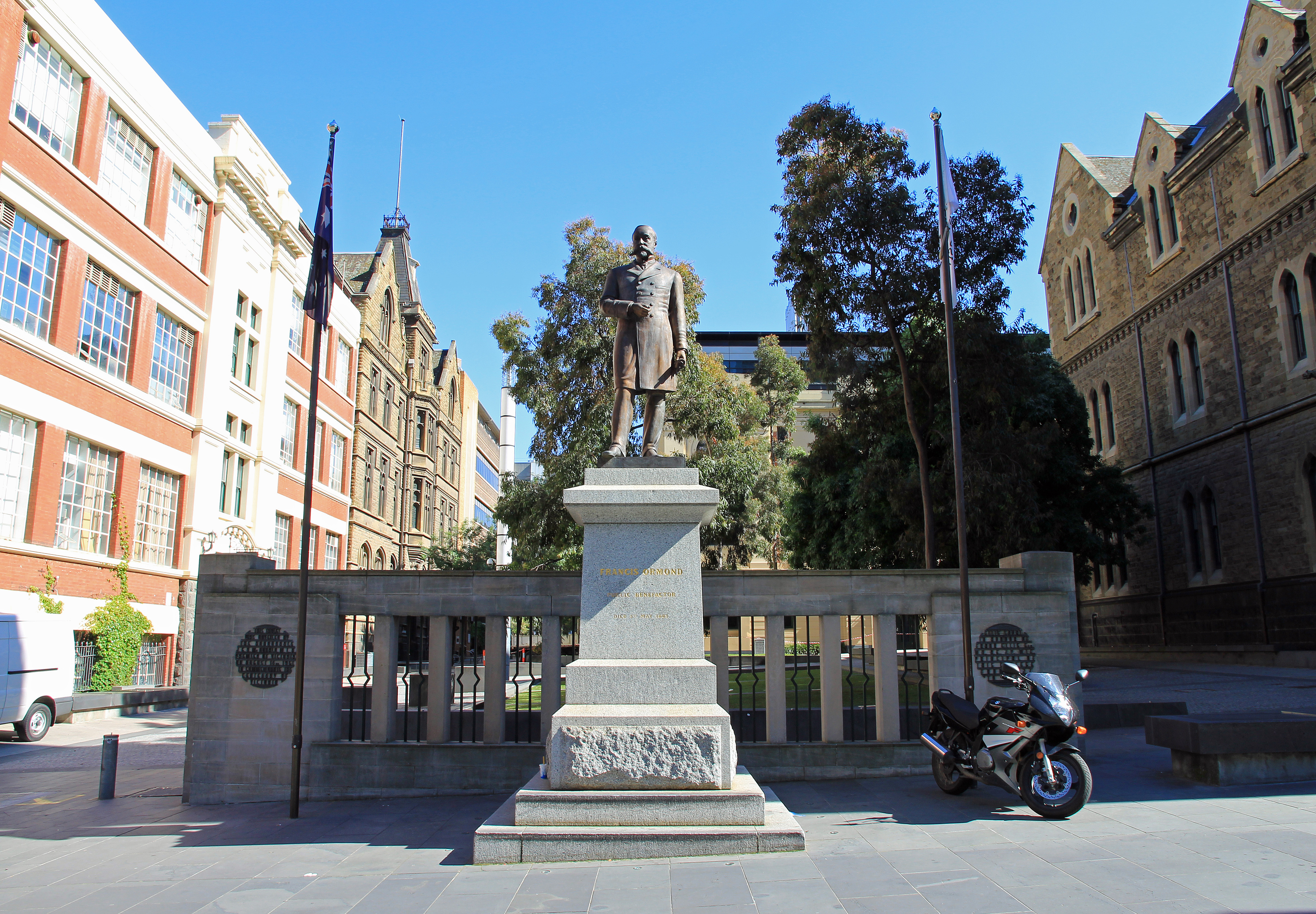
RMIT Building 4, Swanston Street, Melbourne; completed in 1904

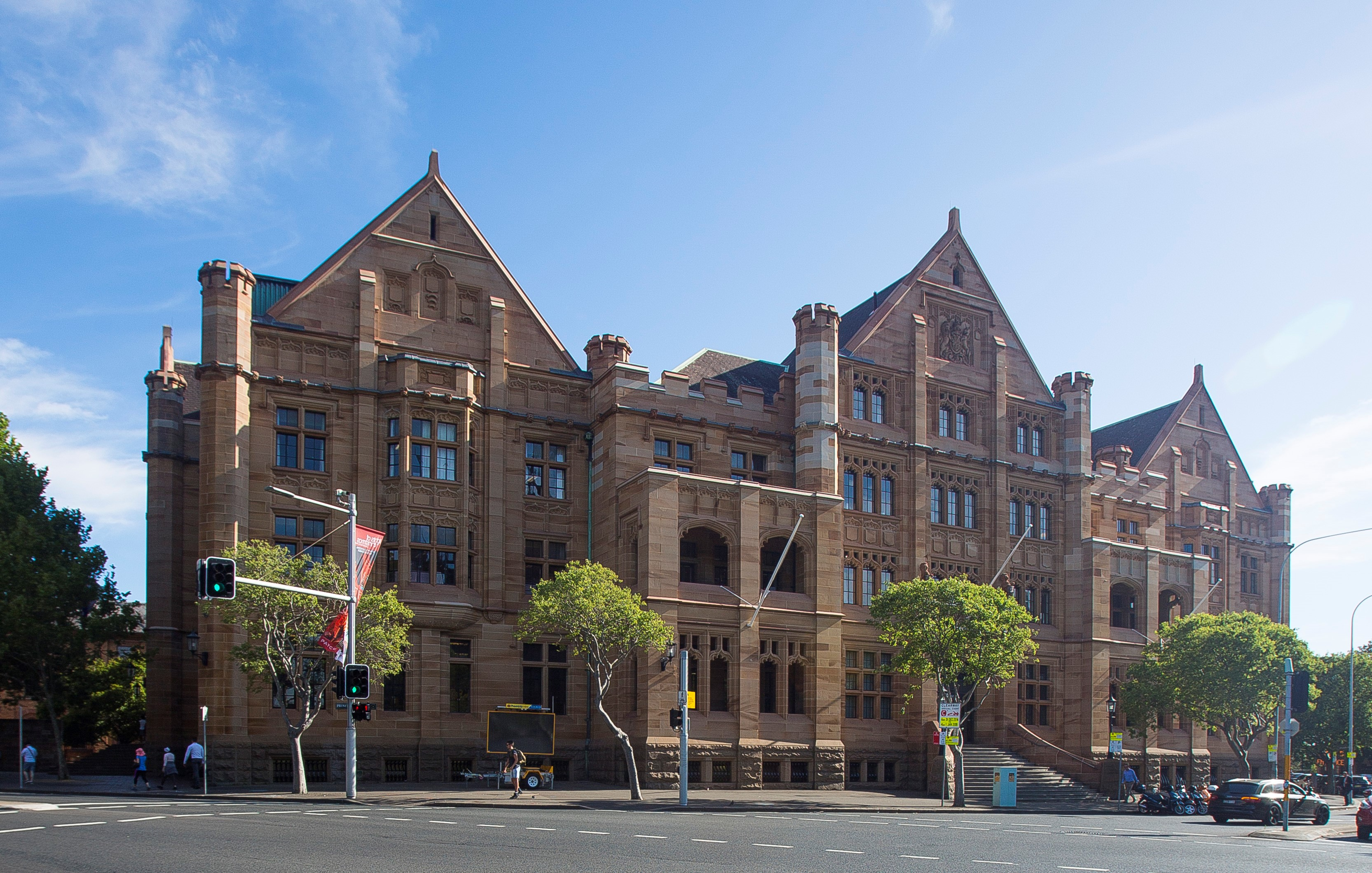
Registrar-General's building, in Sydney; completed in 1913

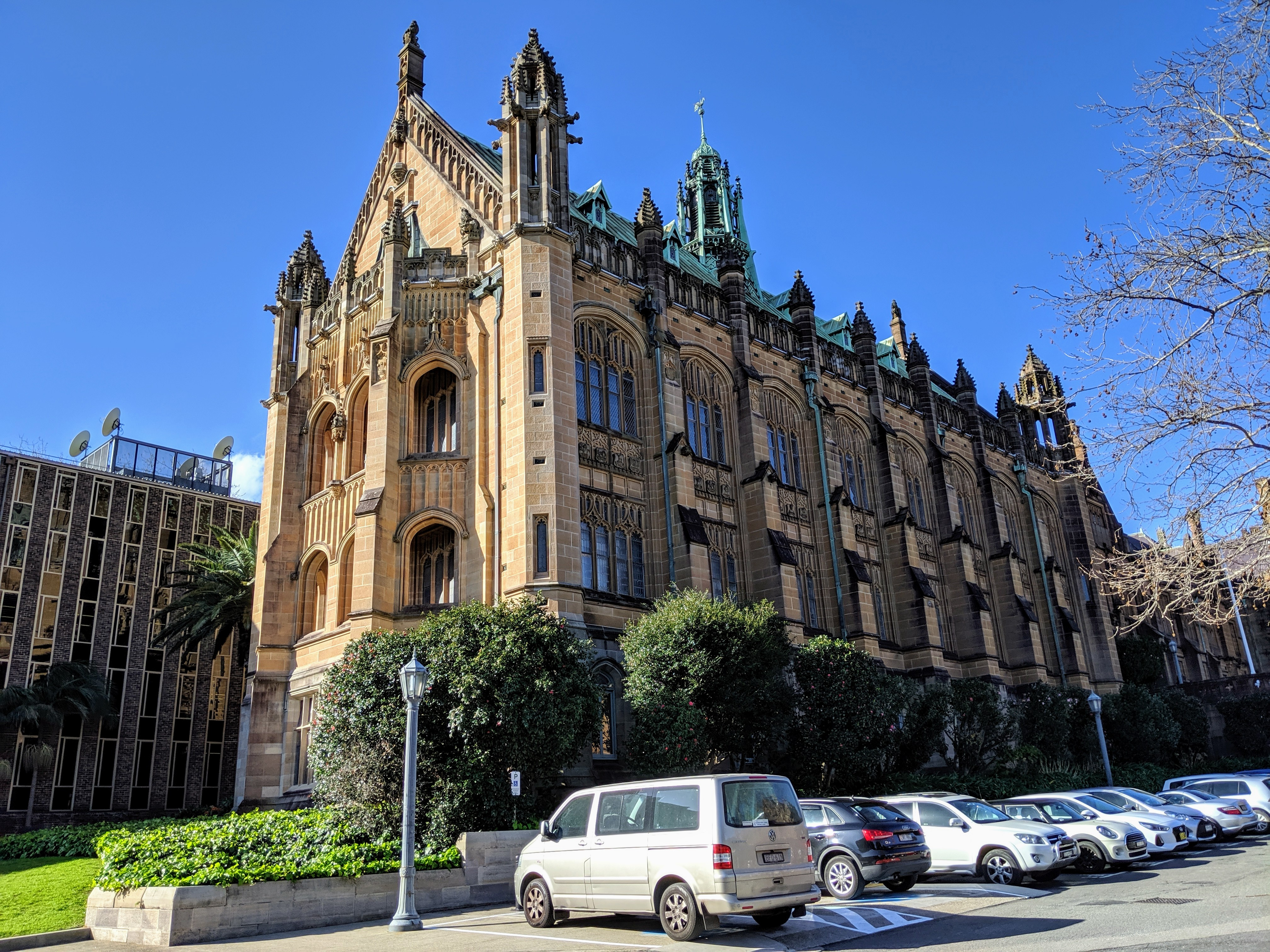
MacLaurin Hall, University of Sydney. Completed 1902–1909

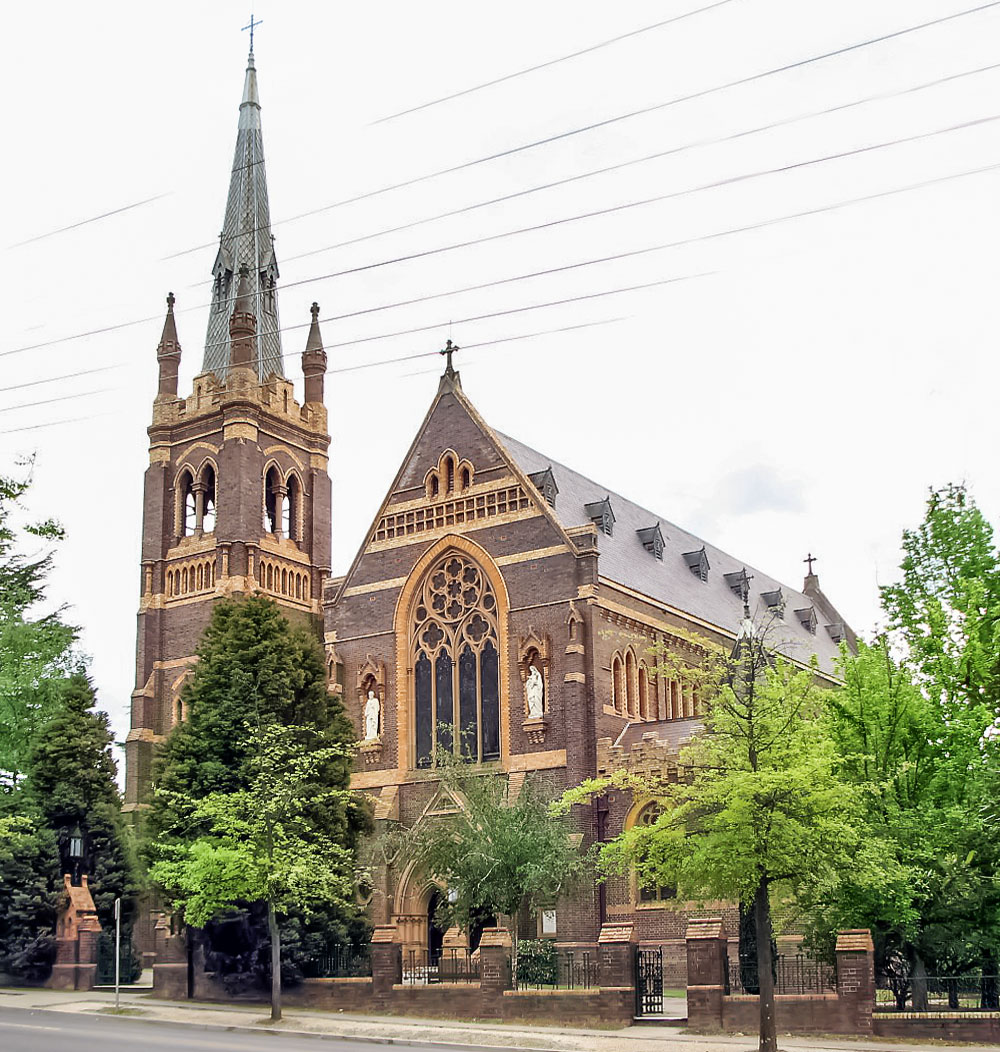
Saints Mary and Joseph Cathedral; Armidale, New South Wales. Completed 1912

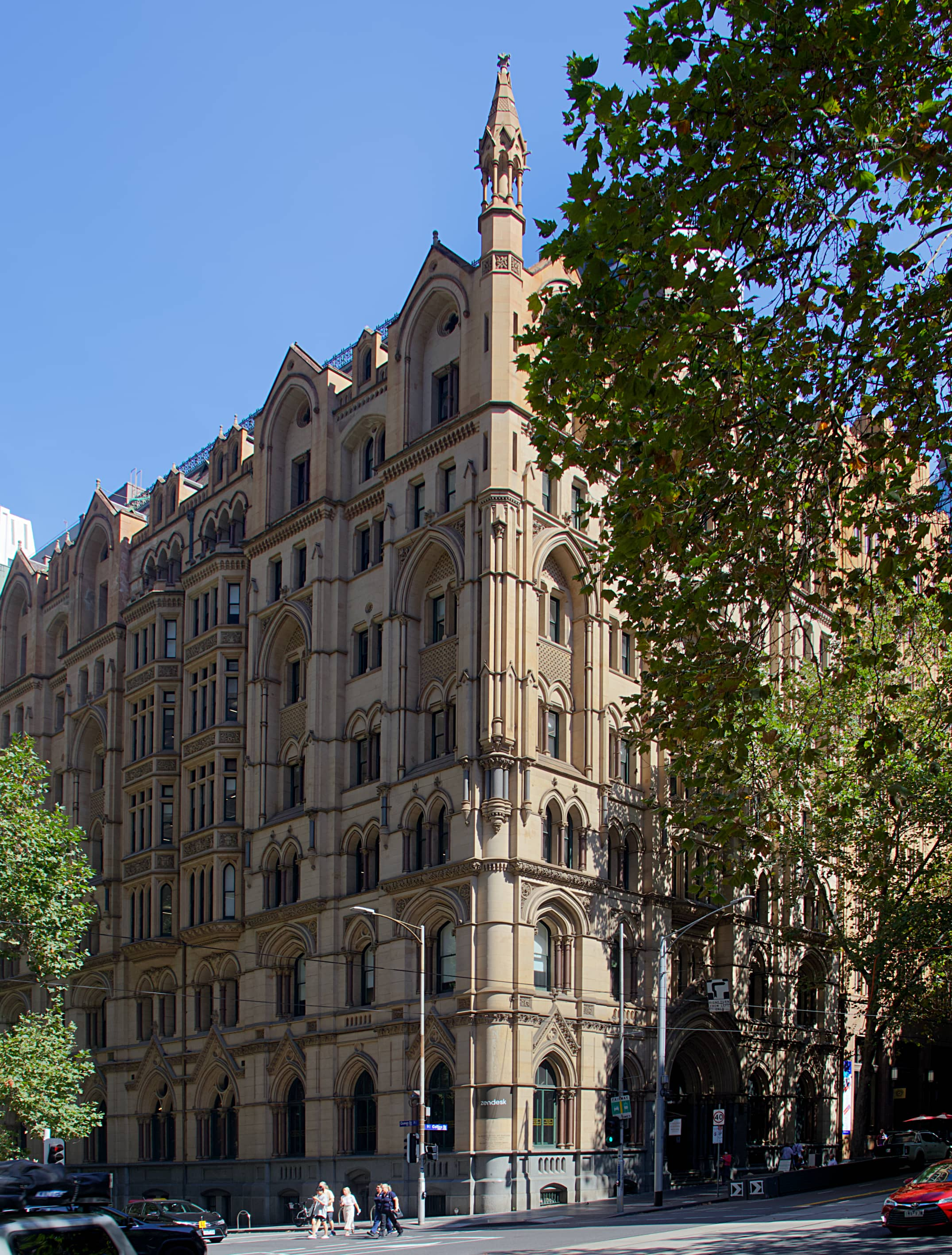
A.C Goode House in Collins Street, Melbourne; completed in 1891

==== Federation Carpenter Gothic ====
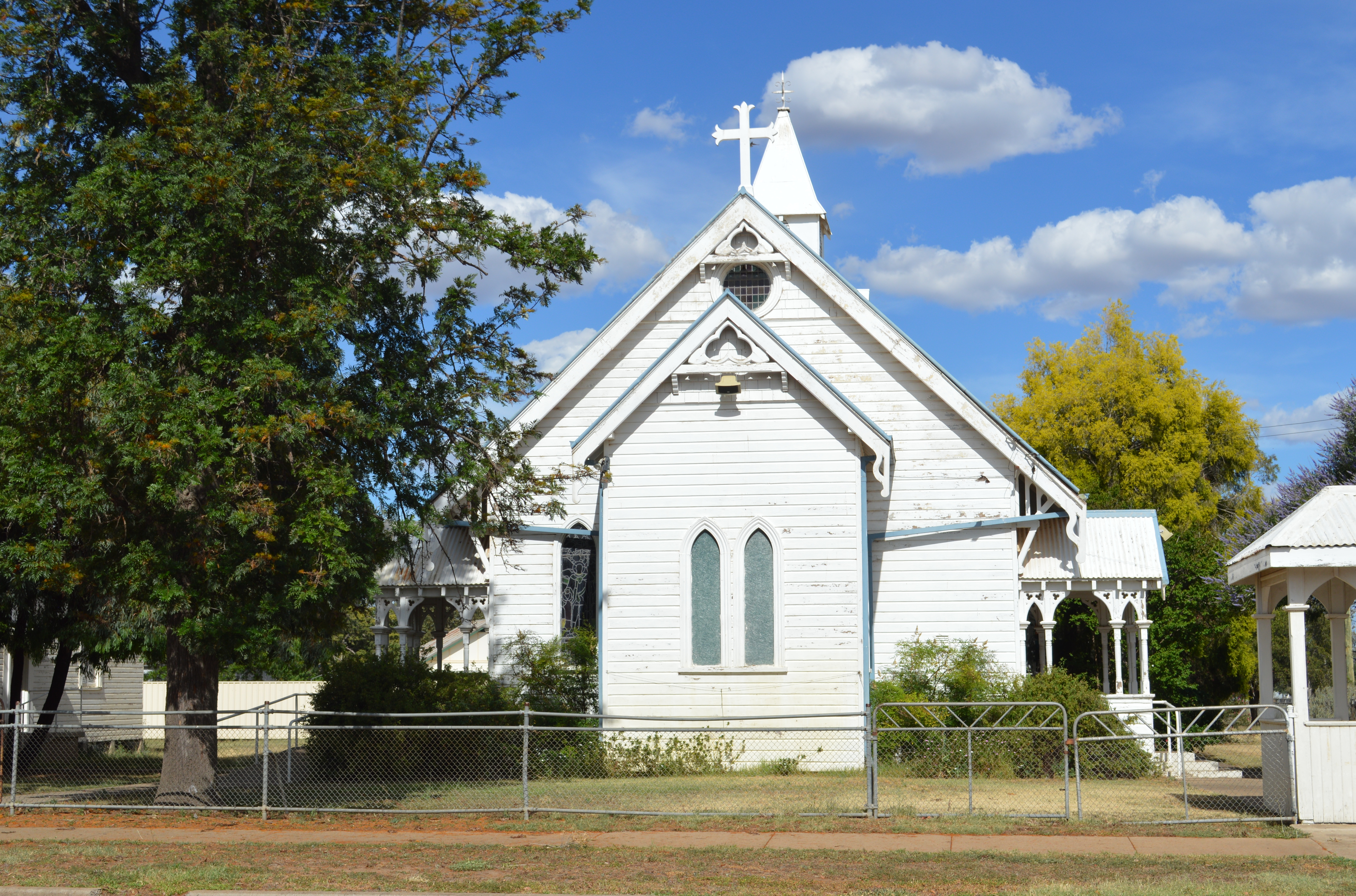
Coonamble Anglican Church

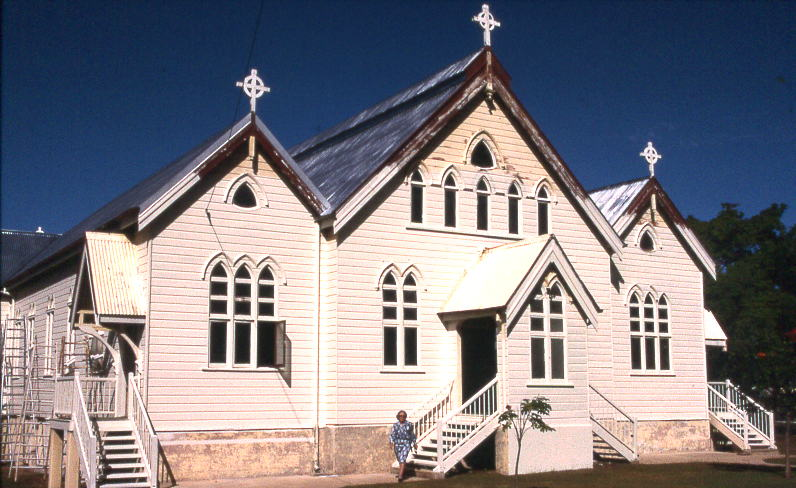
St Mary's Church, Townsville

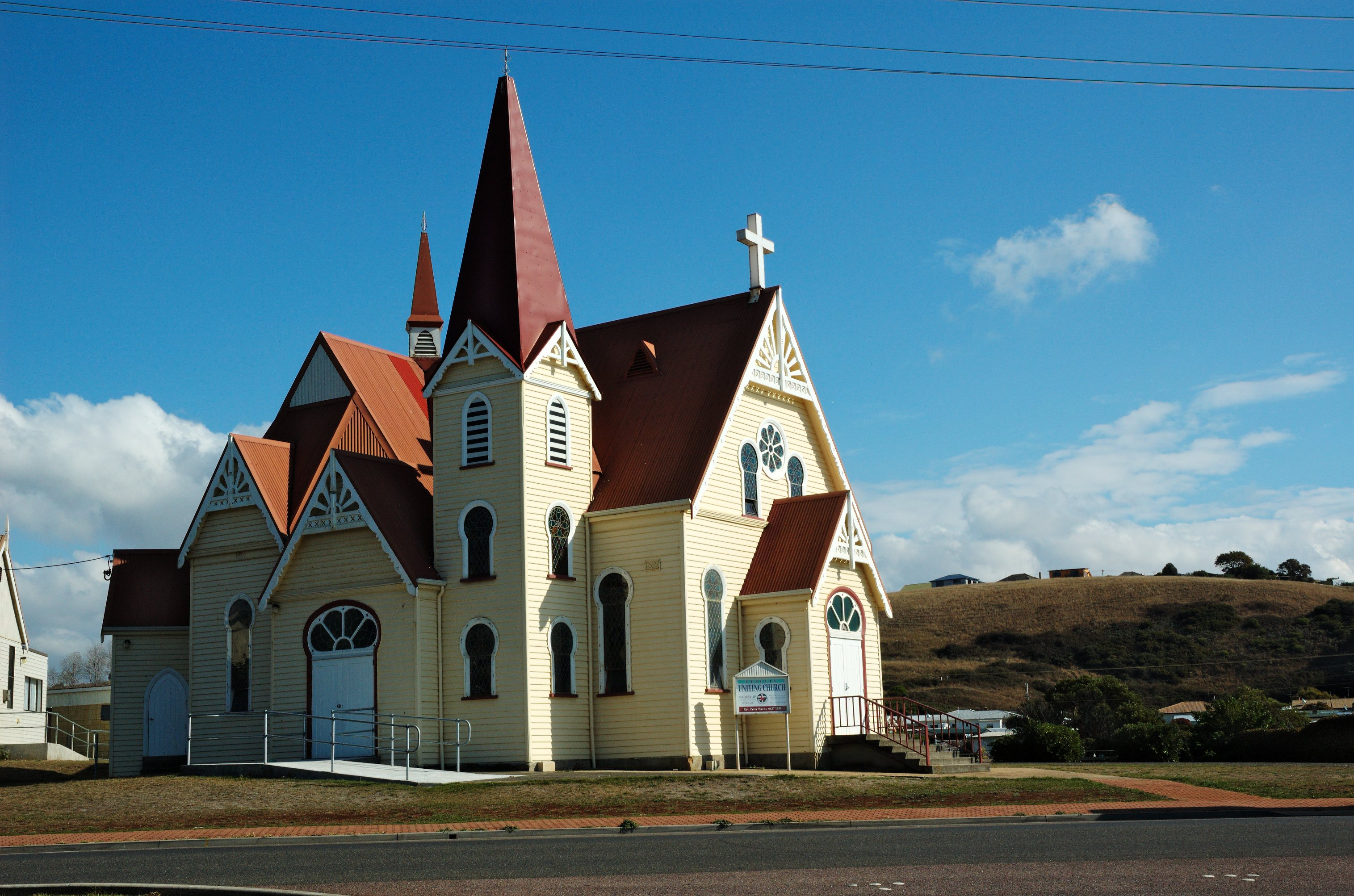
The Uniting Church, Penguin, Tasmania. Completed 1903

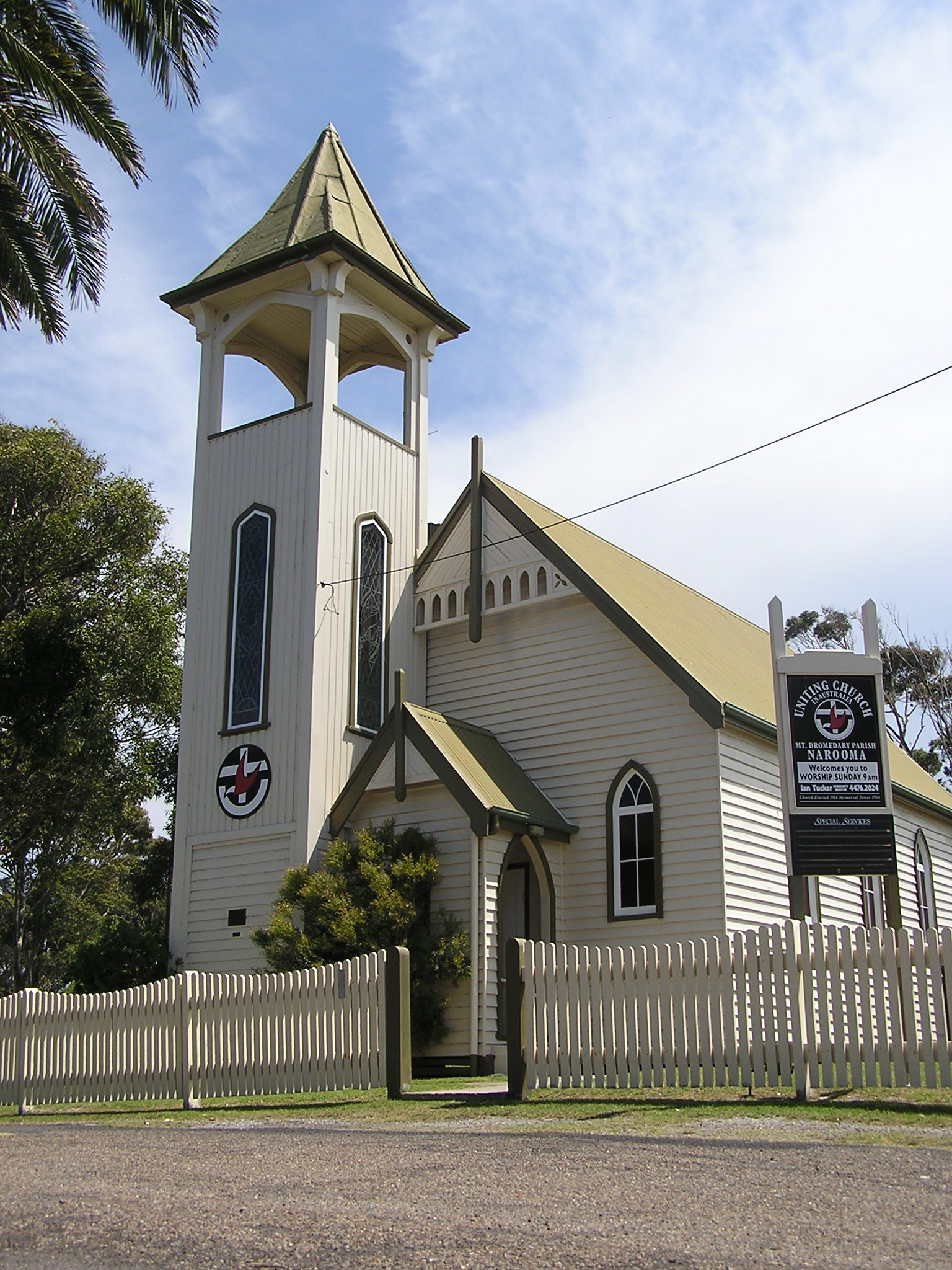
The Uniting Church at Narooma; completed in 1914.

=== Federation Warehouse ===
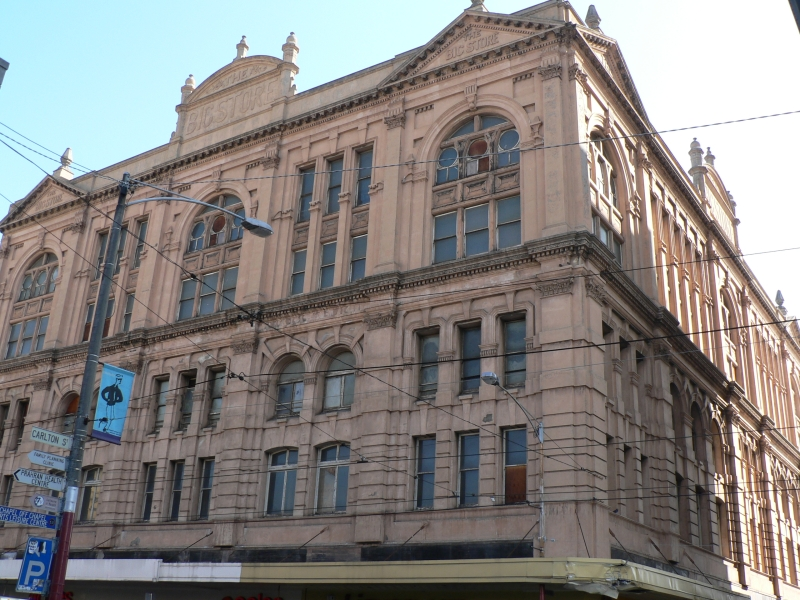
The Big Store, Prahran, completed 1902.

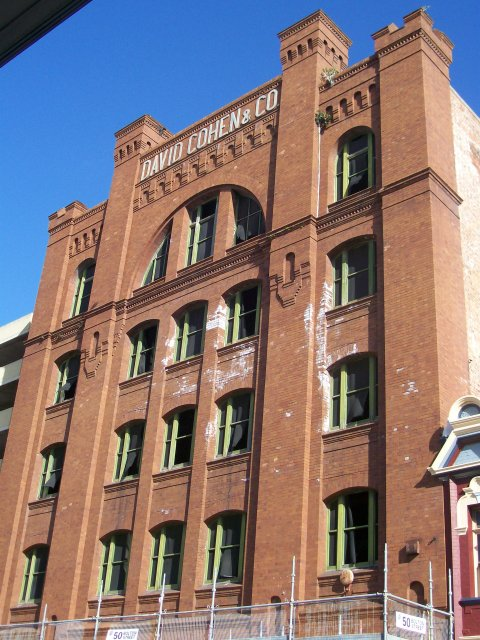
Former 'David Cohen & Co. warehouse, Newcastle. Built 1901.

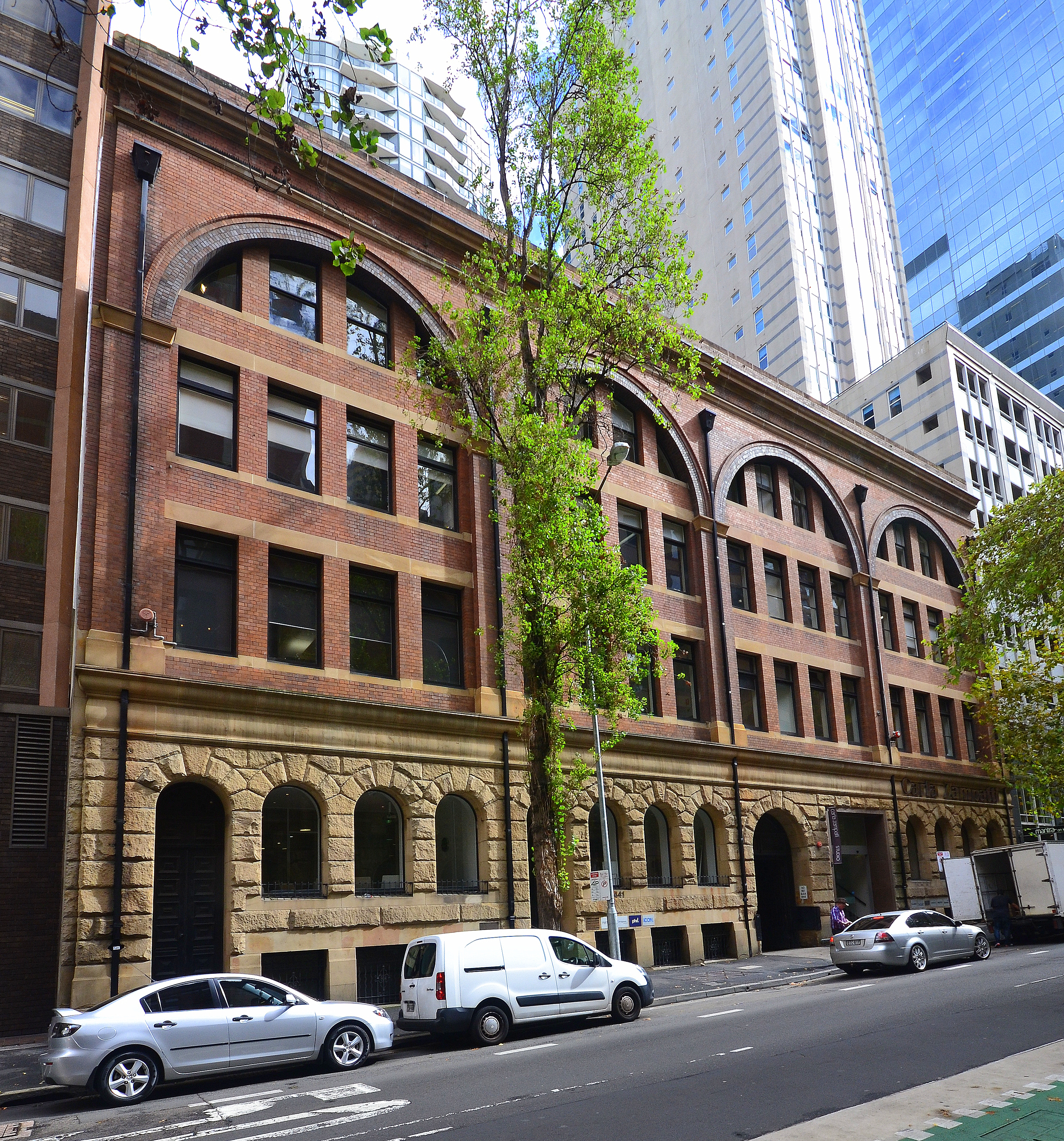
Former Edwards Dunlop & Co Ltd stores, Kent Street, Sydney. Built c.1897.

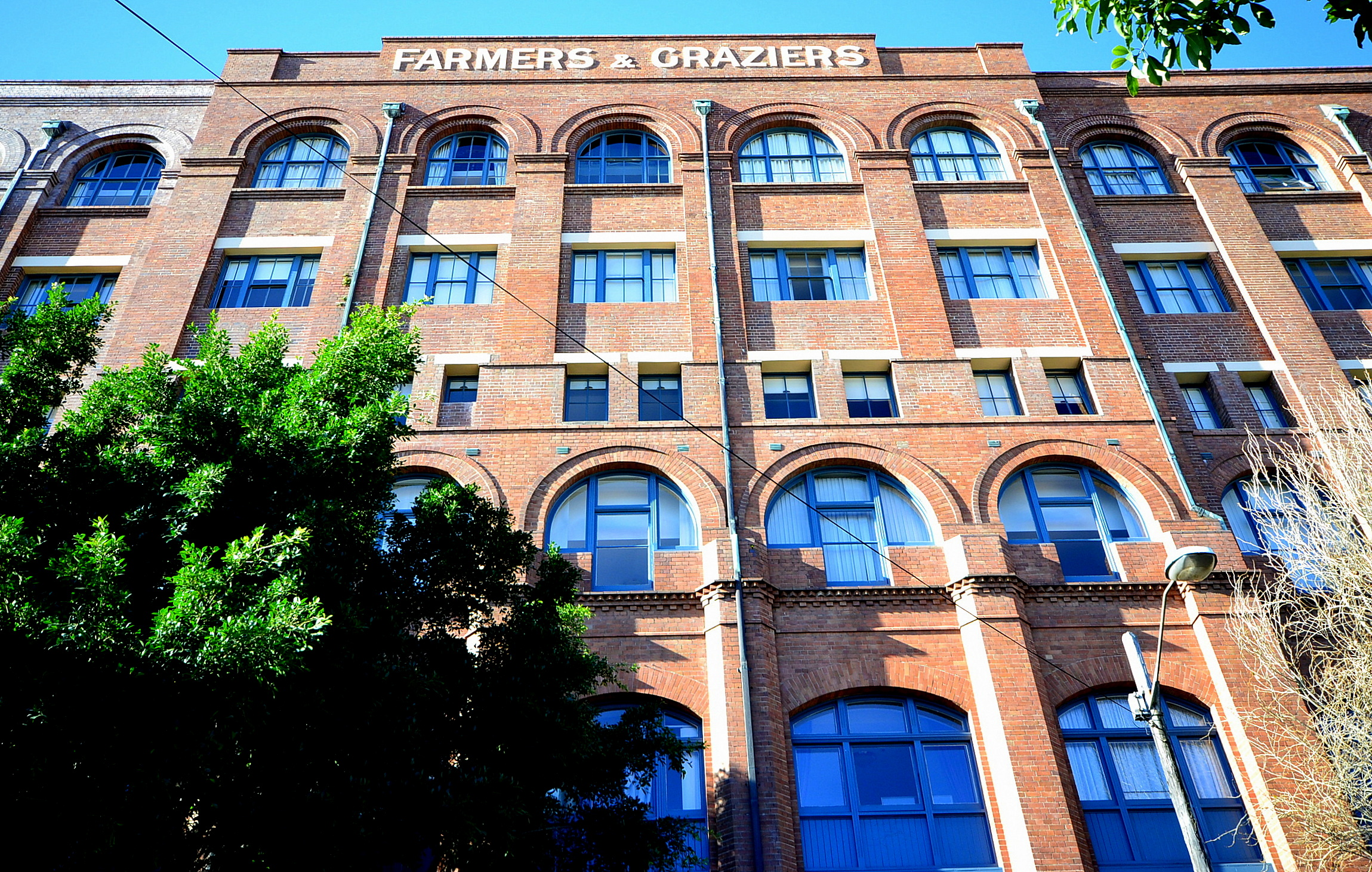
Former Farmers & Graziers Building, Ultimo. Built from 1895.

=== Federation Queen Anne ===
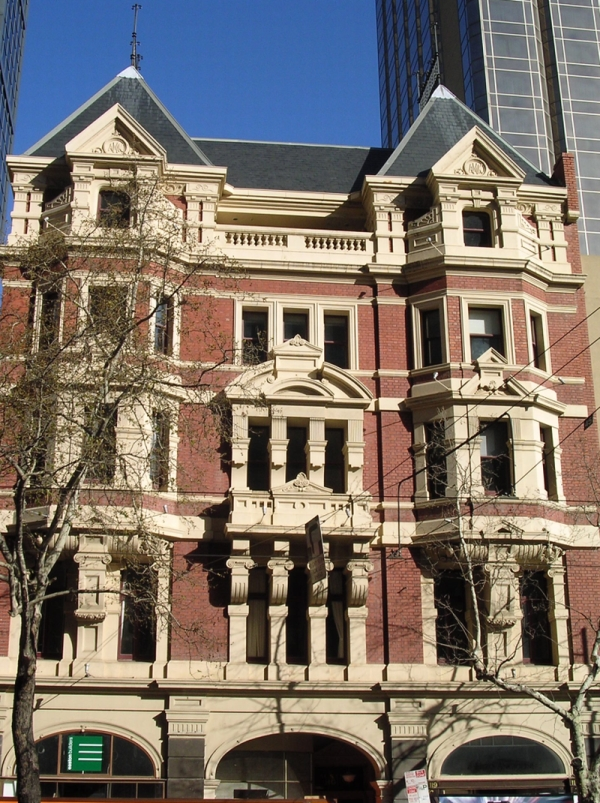
The Austral Buildings, Collins Street, Melbourne; completed in 1891

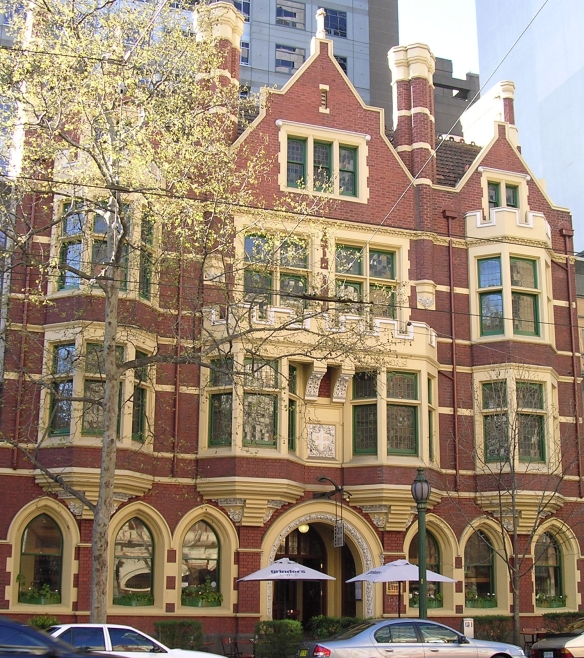
Professional Chambers, Collins Street, Melbourne; completed in 1908

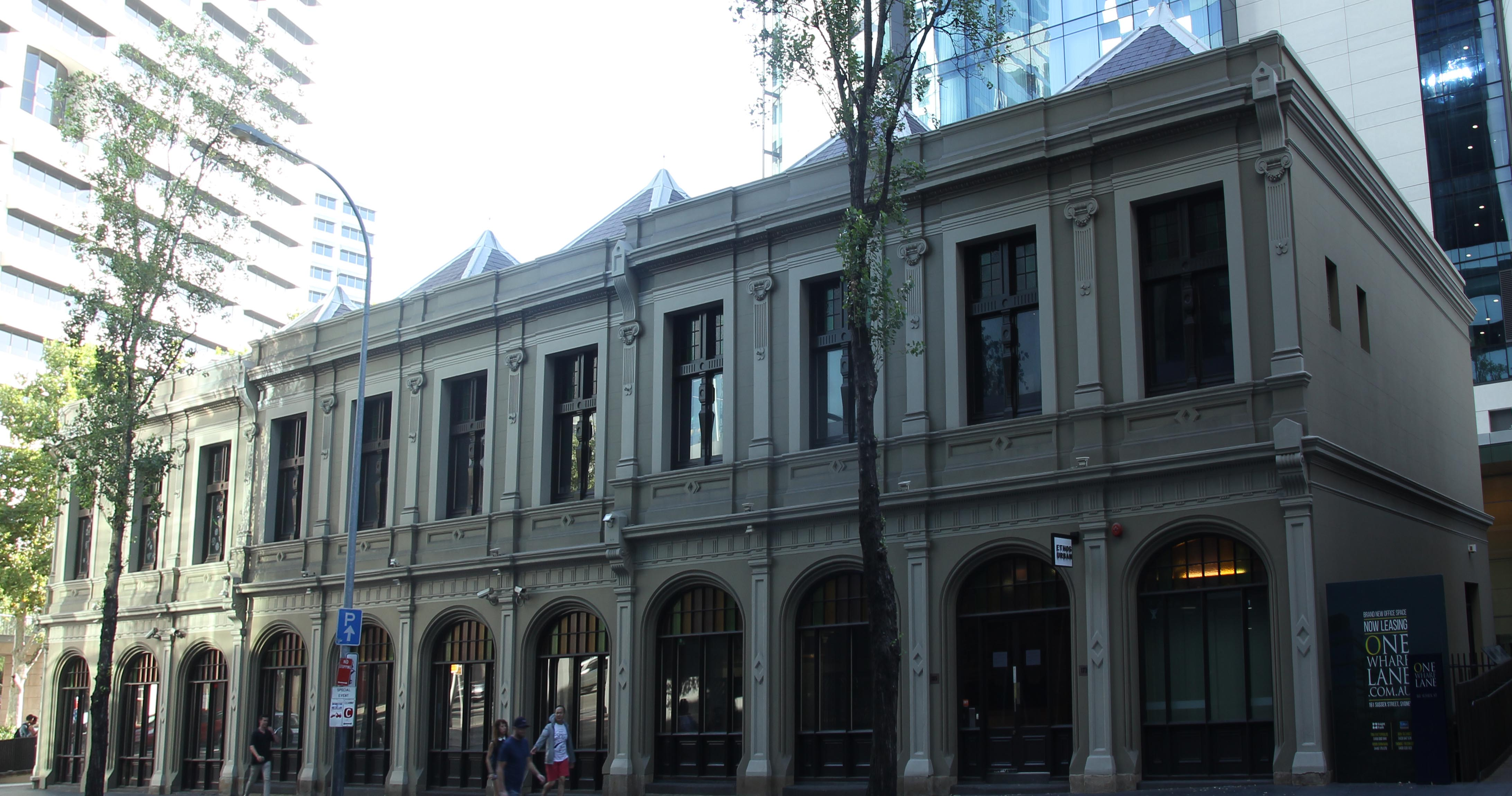
The Sydney Corn Exchange, a rare remaining warehouse; built from 1887 and designed by George McRae

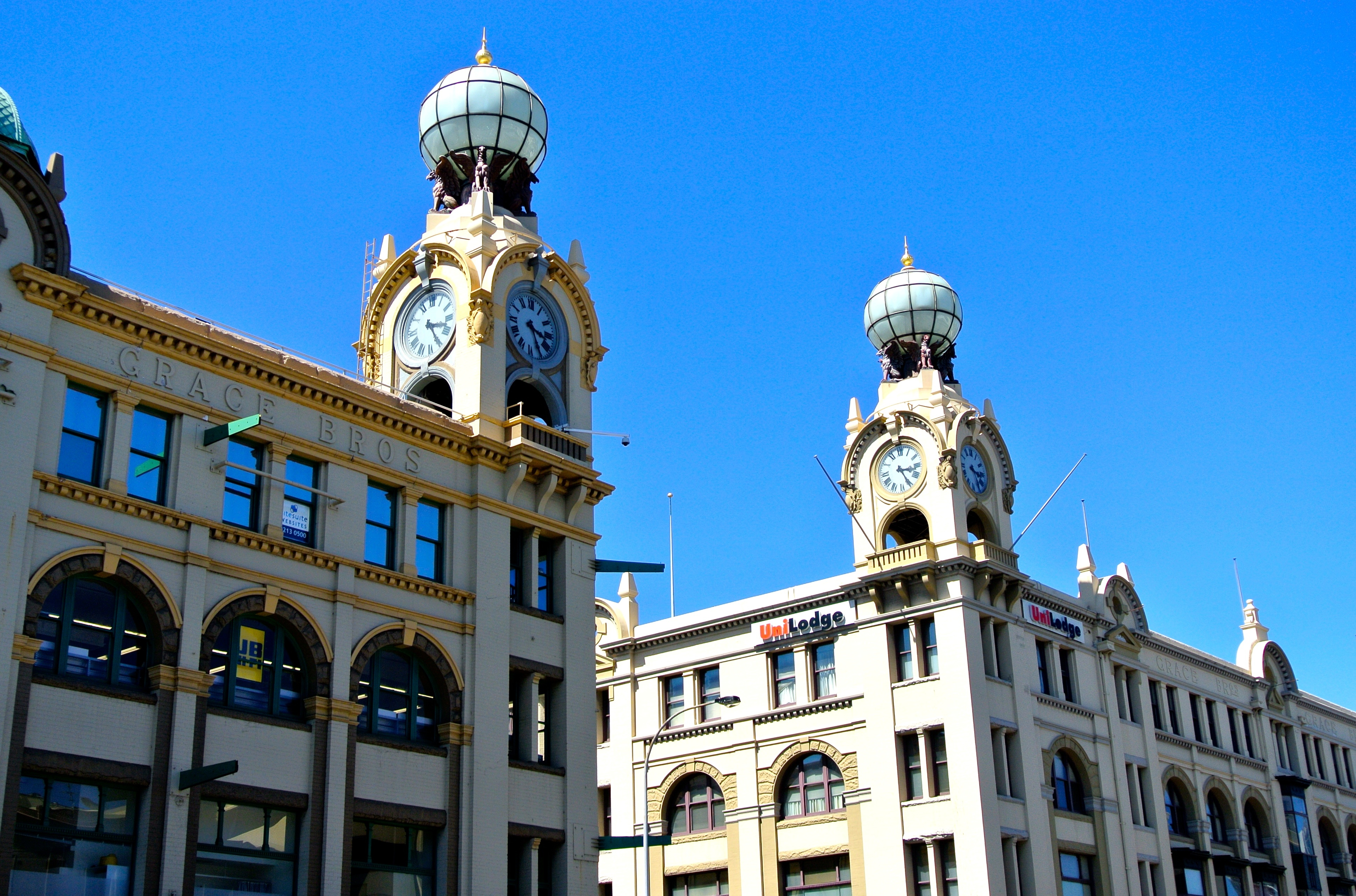
Grace Brothers Department Store, Broadway, Sydney. Completed 1923

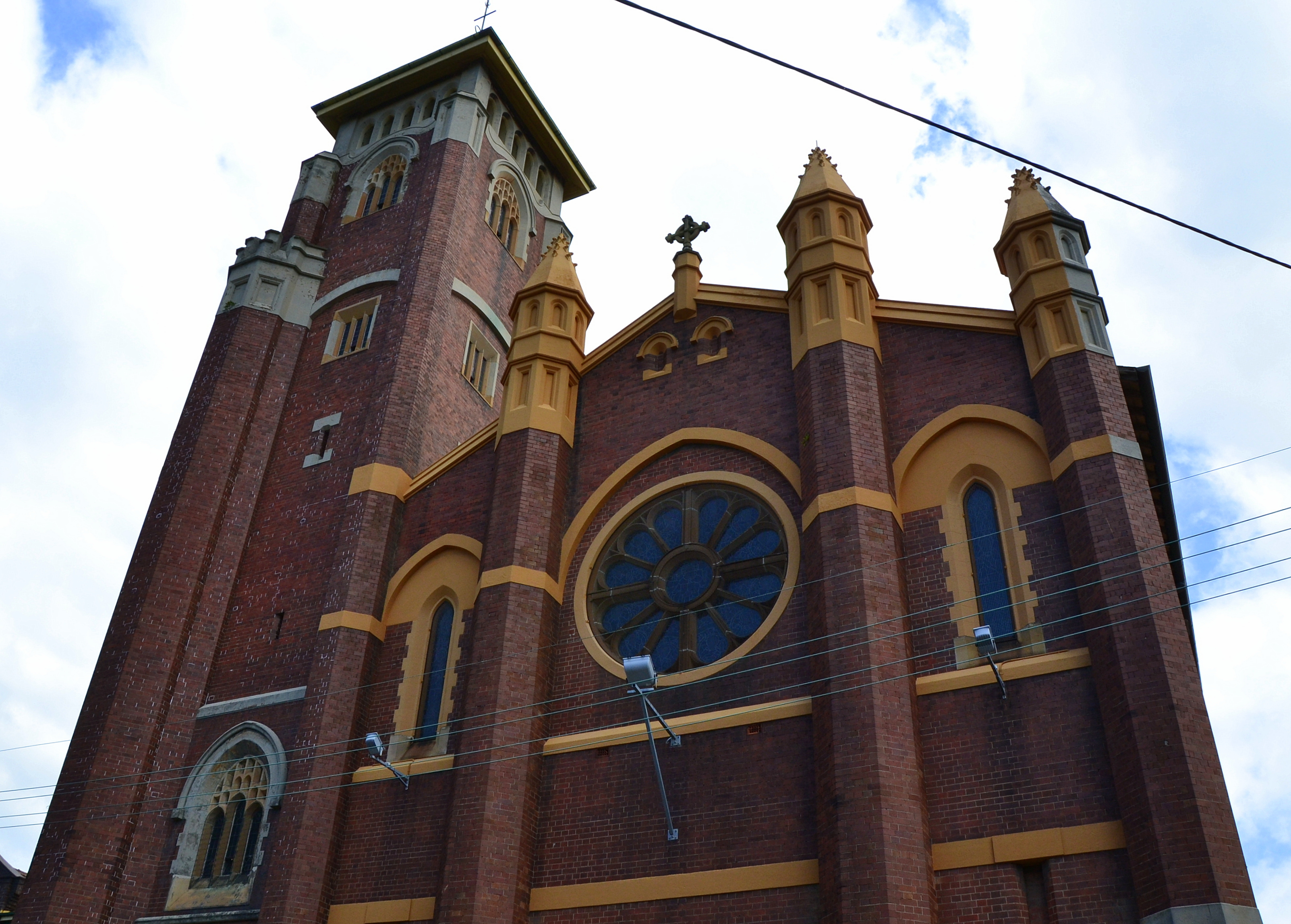
St Augustine's Church, Balmain, New South Wales. Completed 1905

=== Federation Free Style ===
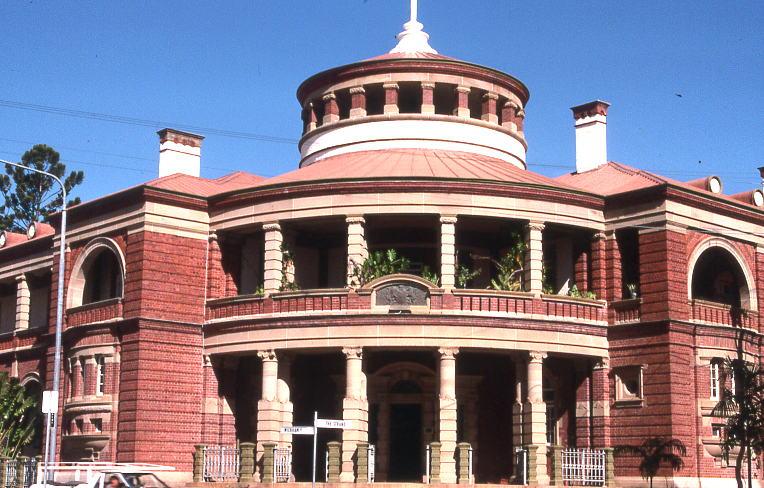
Townsville Customs House. Completed 1902; architect, George David Payne.

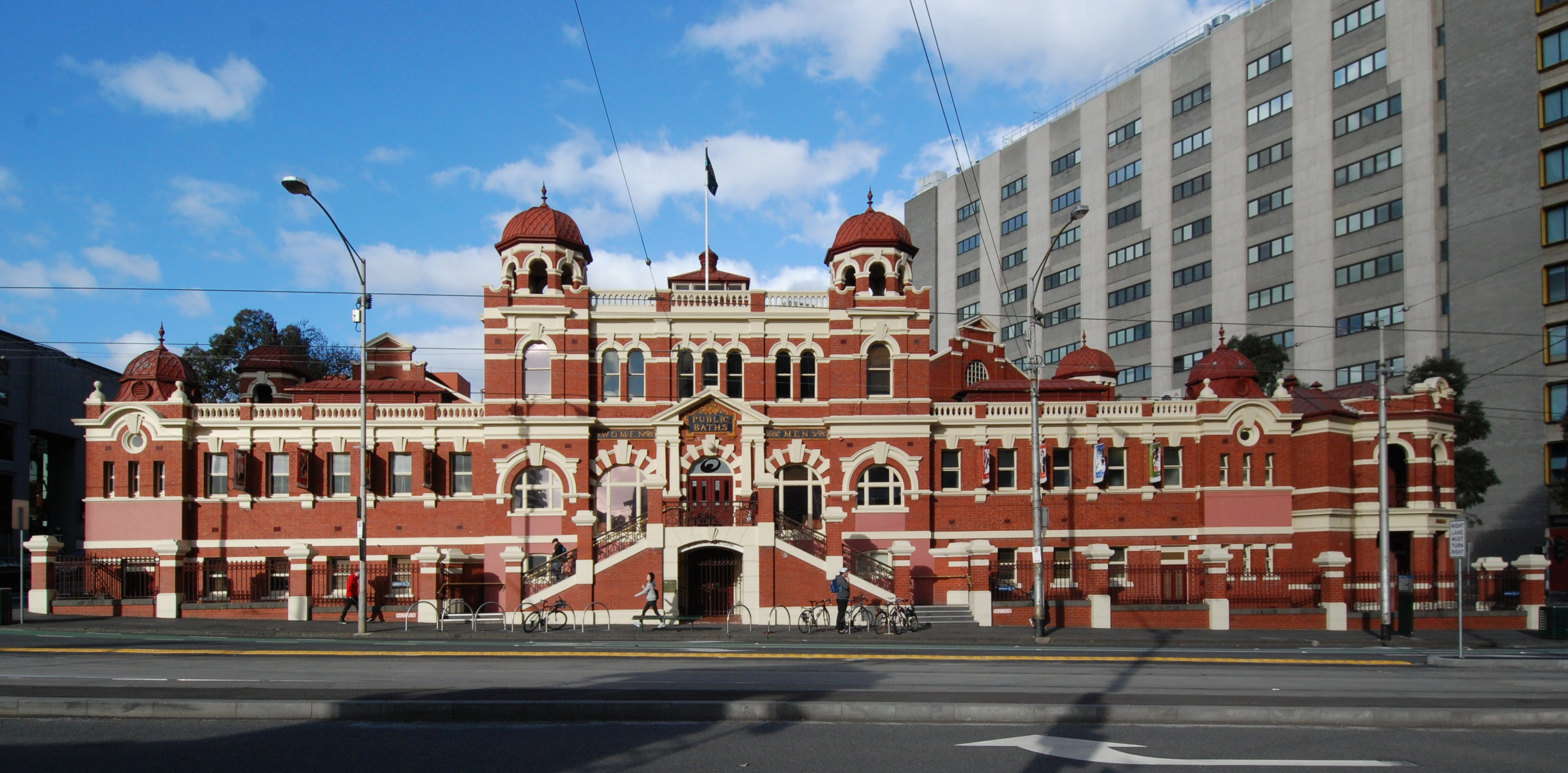
City Baths, Melbourne; completed 1904. Design by J J Clark & E J Clark.

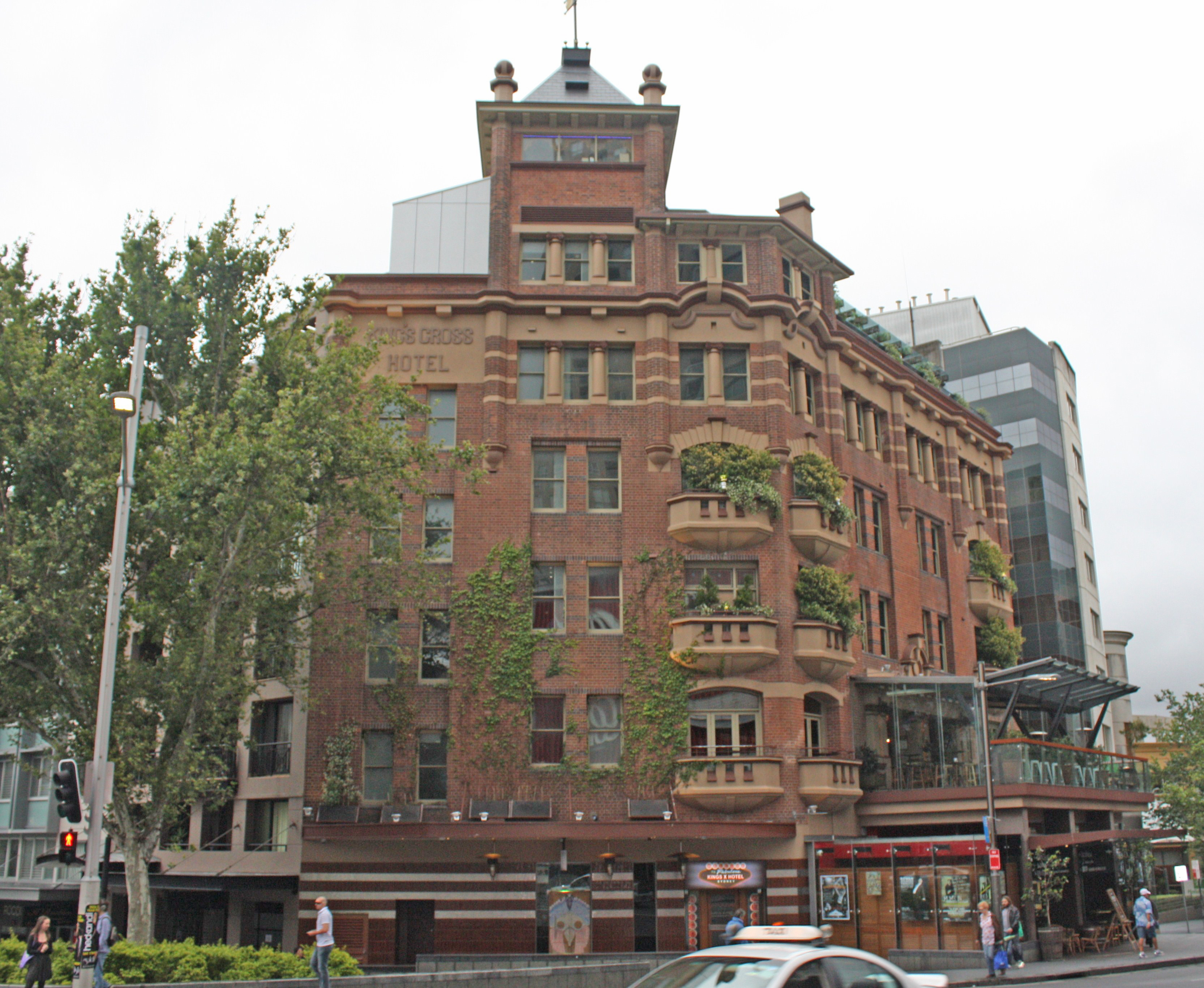
Kings Cross Hotel, Kings Cross. Built c. 1915.

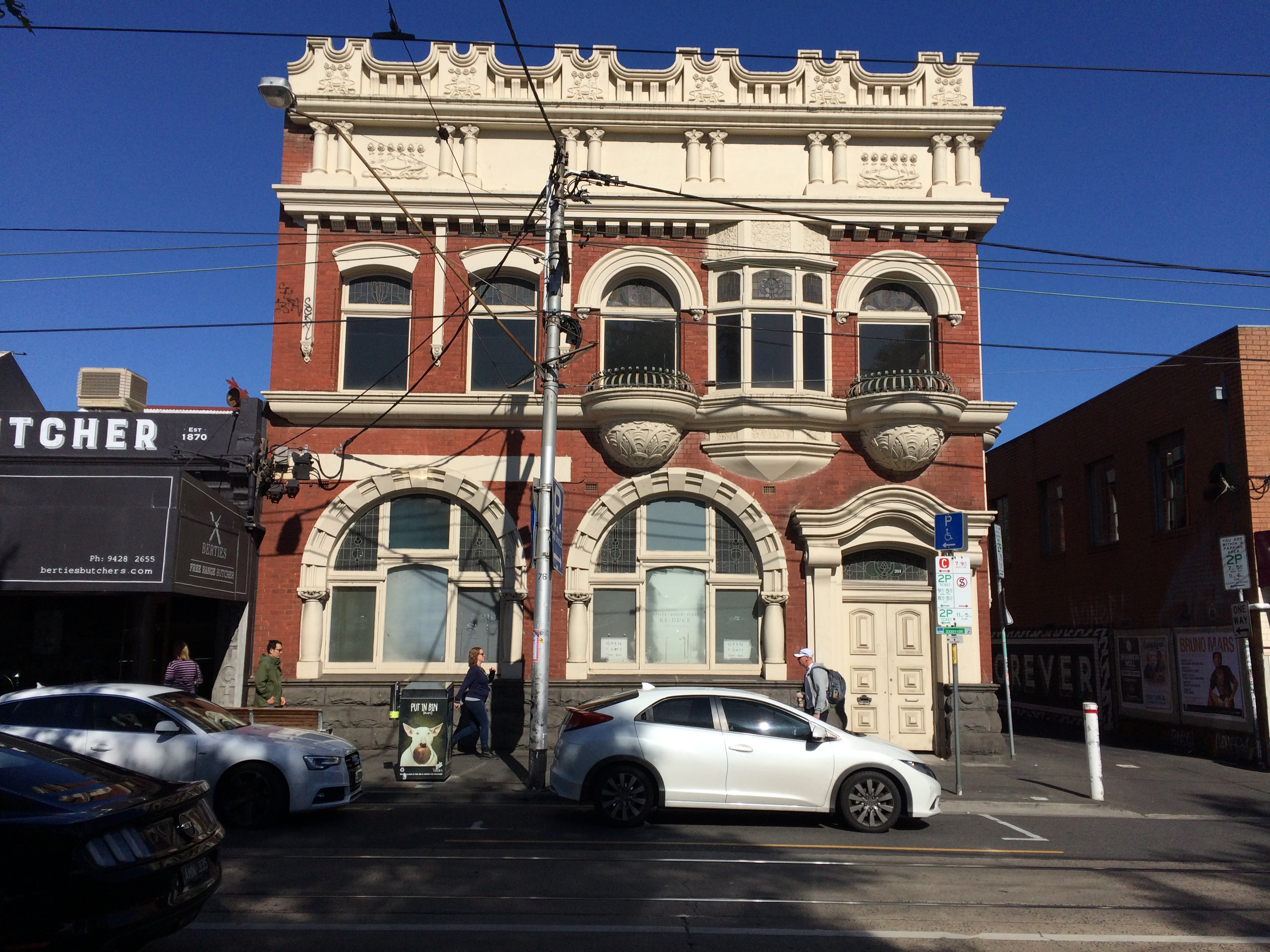
State Savings Bank building, Richmond. Completed c. 1905; architect; Smith & Ogg.

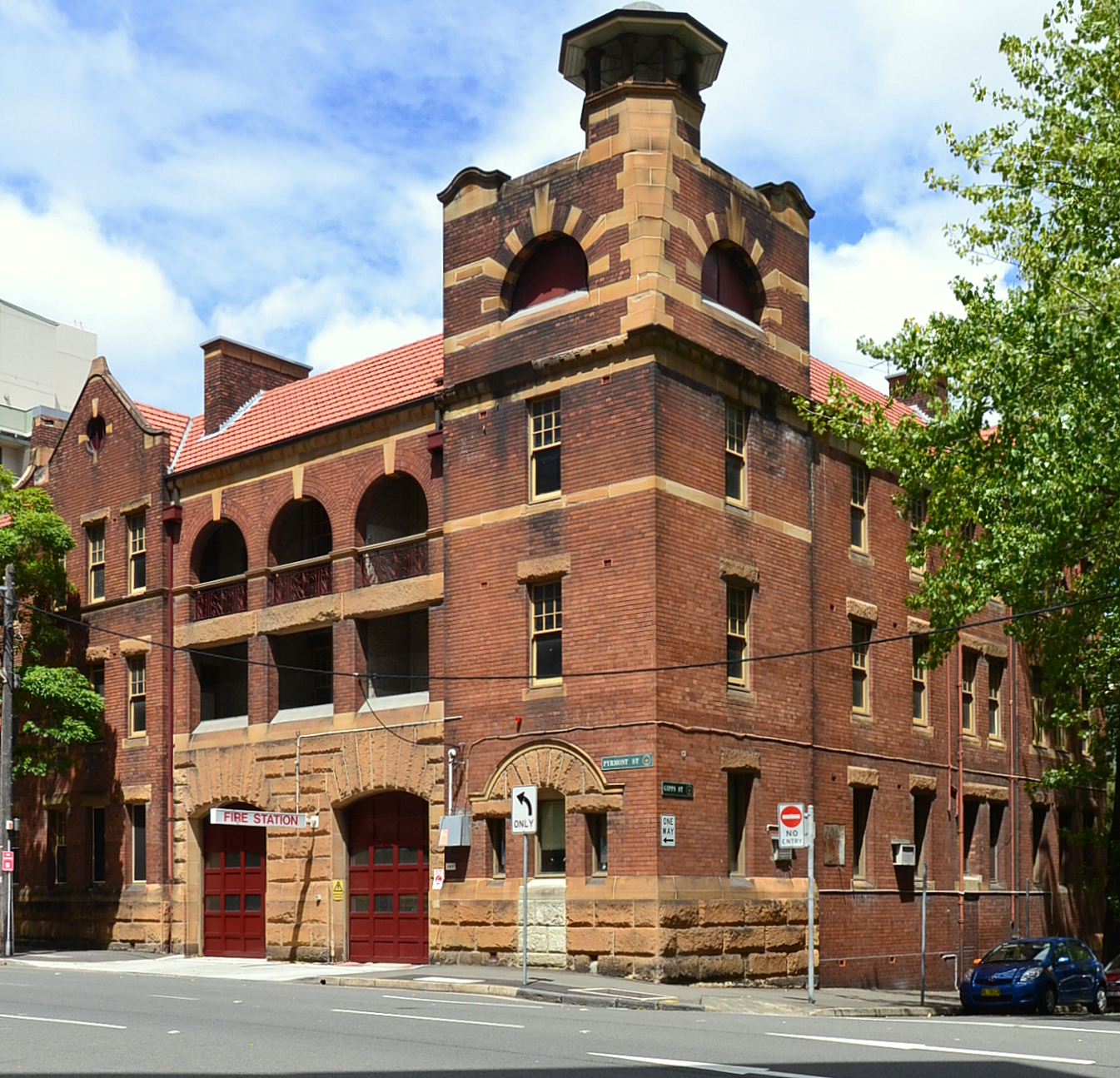
Fire station, Pyrmont. Completed 1906; architect, Walter Liberty Vernon.

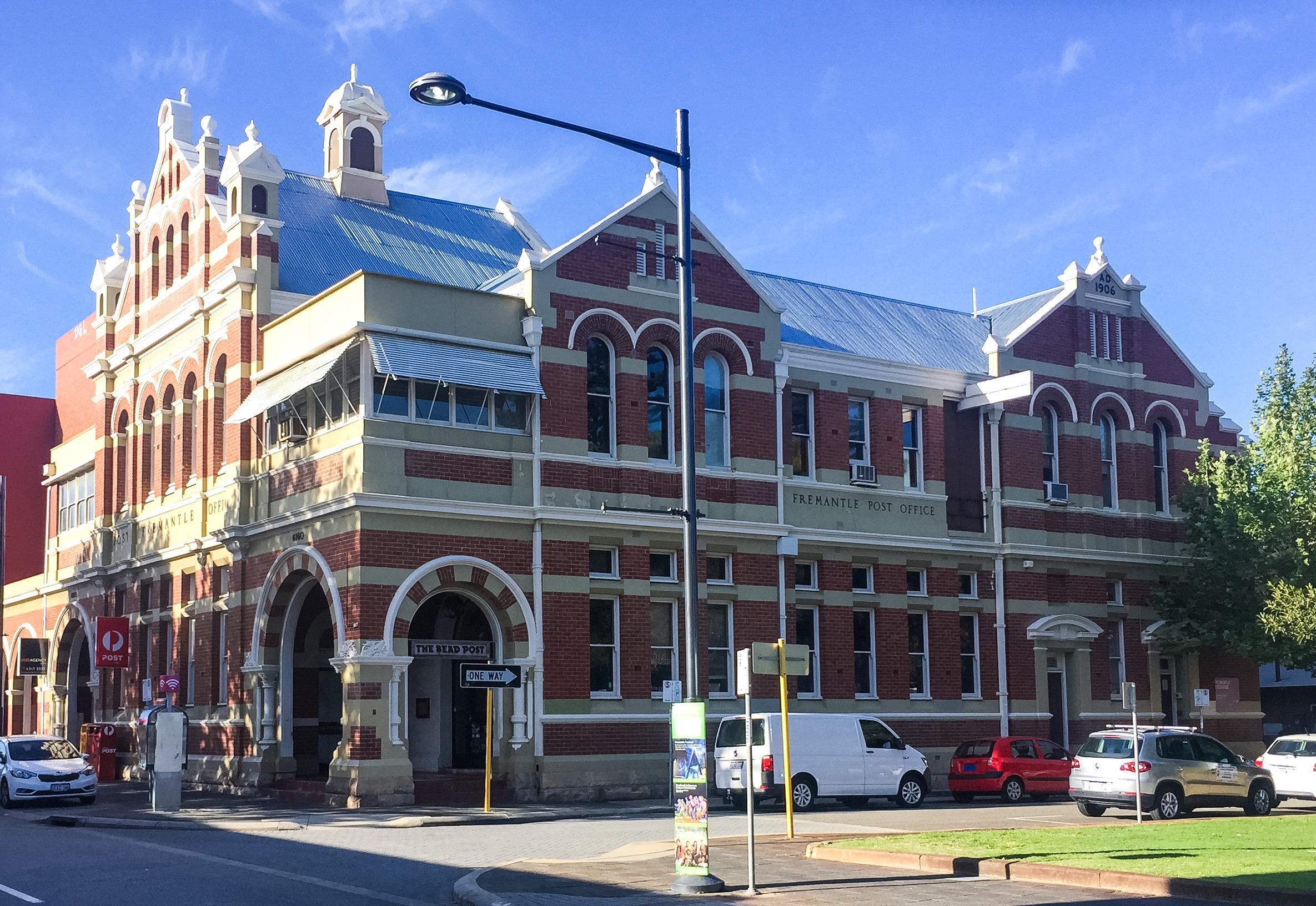
Fremantle Post Office. Completed 1907; architect, Hilson Beasley. Alternating bands of red brick and pale stucco dominate the facade.

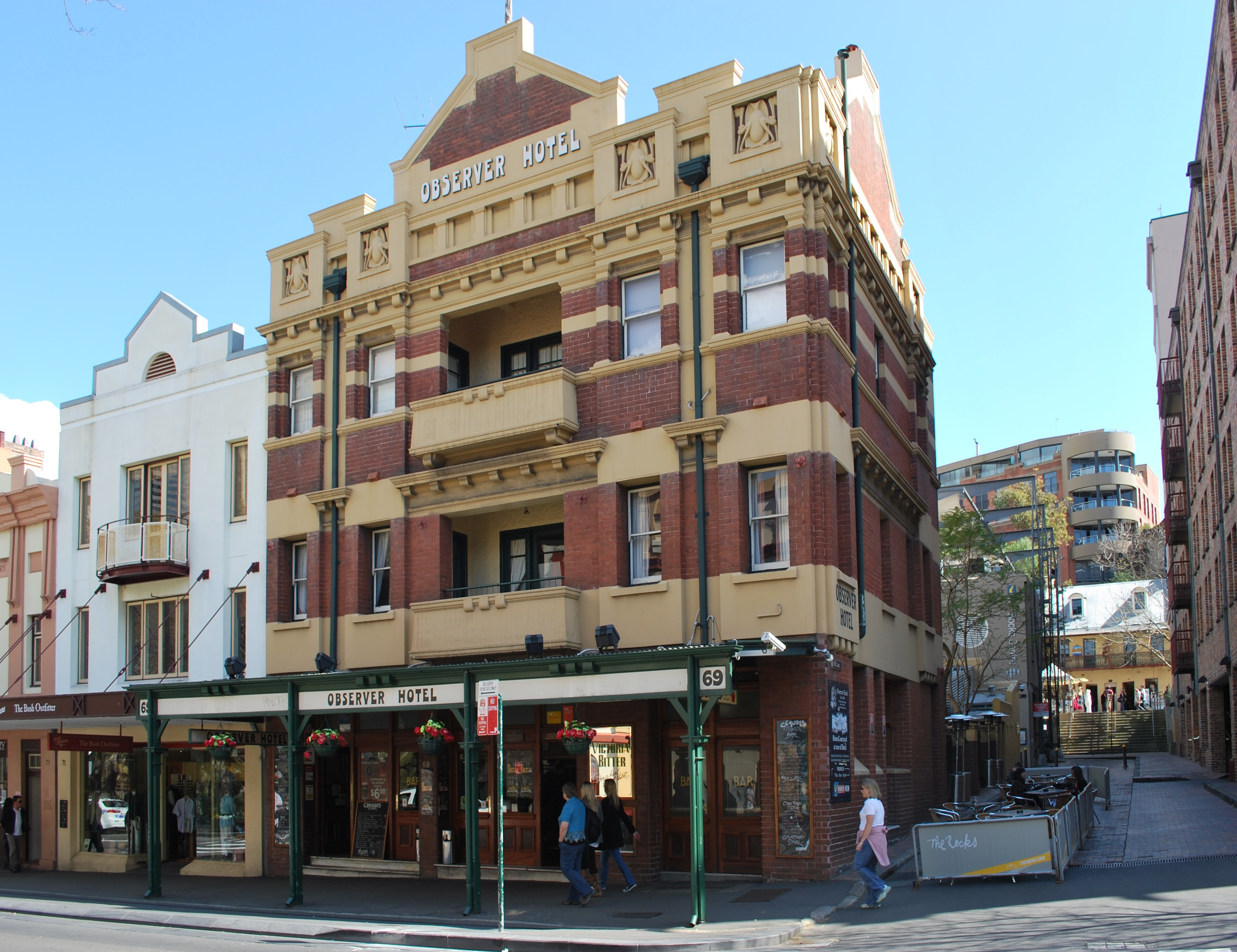
Observer Hotel, The Rocks. Completed 1908; architects, Halligan & Wilton.

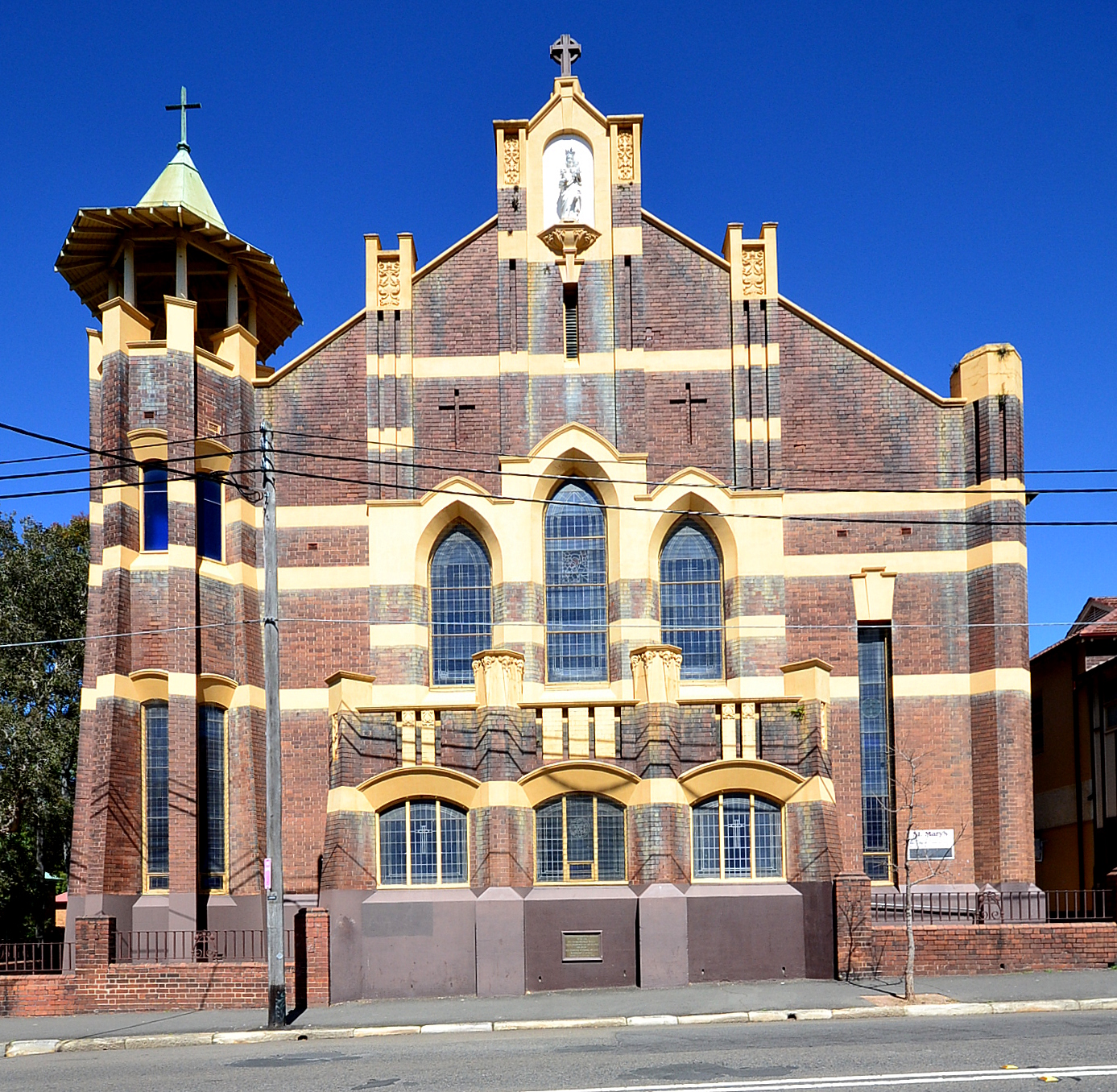
St Marys Catholic Church, Erskineville. Built c. 1912; architect, J. McCarthy. An uninhibited reinterpretation of the Gothic style.

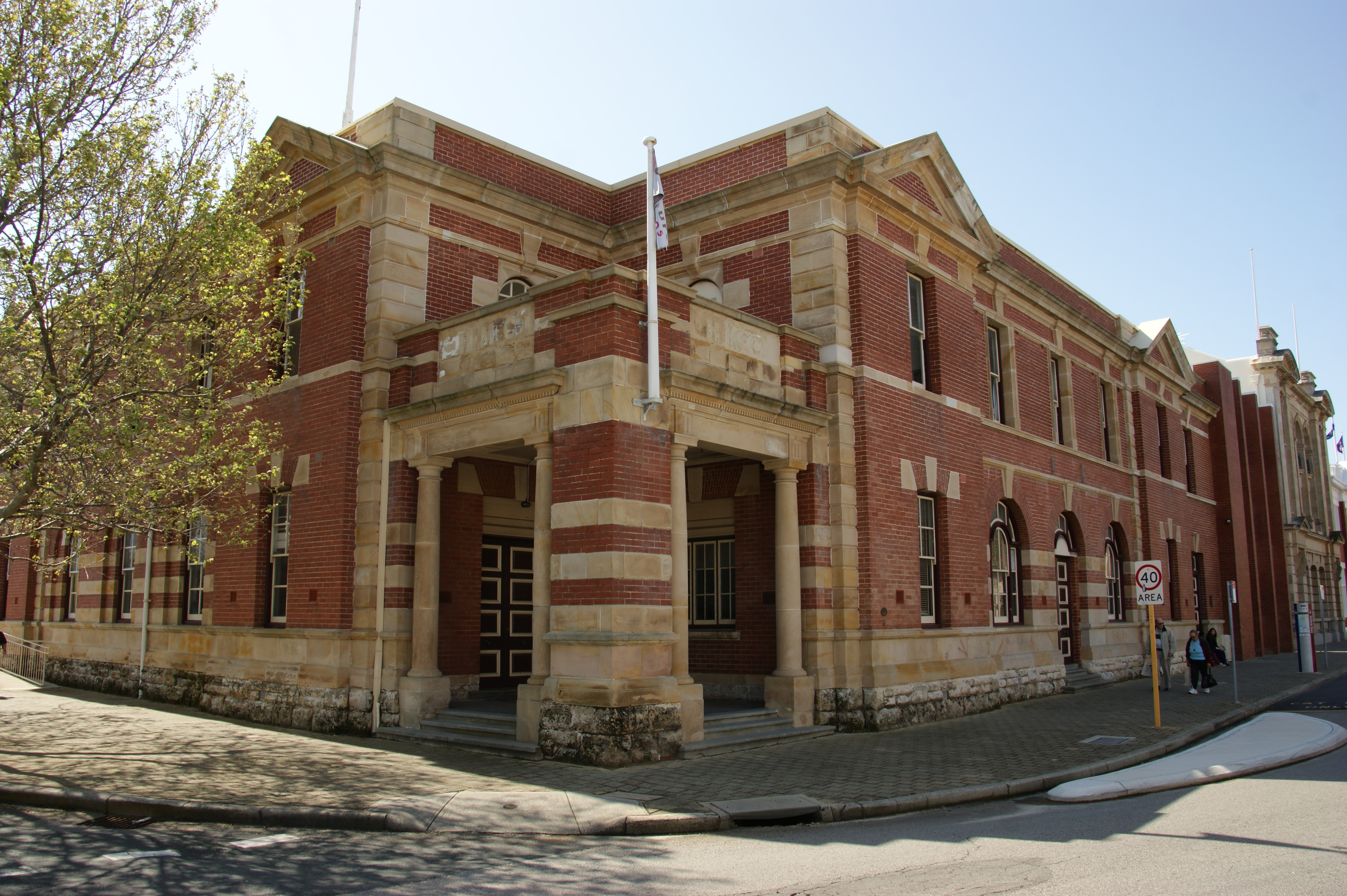
Fremantle Customs House. Completed 1908; architect, Hilson Beasley.

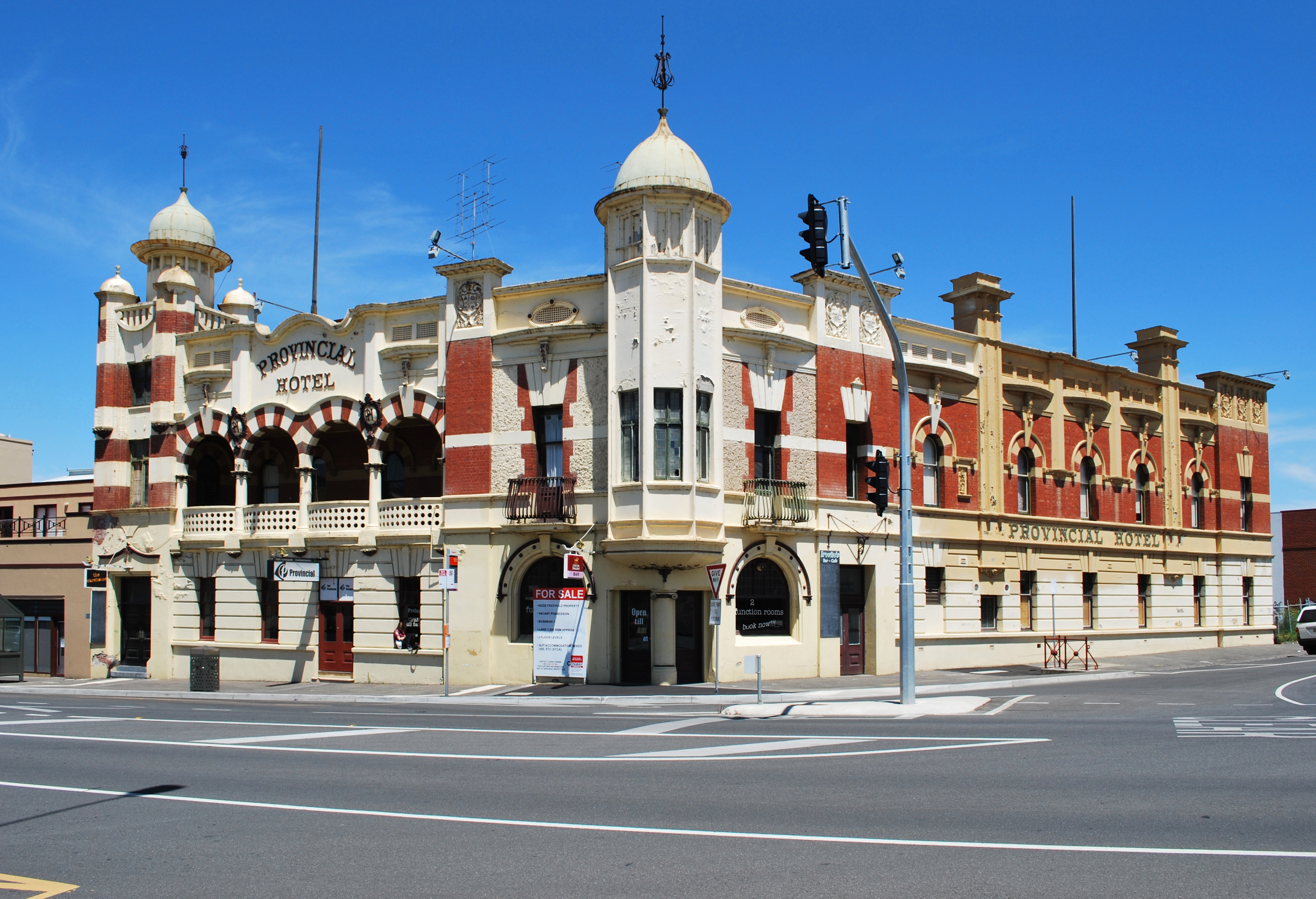
Provincial Hotel, Ballarat; completed in 1909; architect, Percy Richards. A fanciful freestyle composition with moorish and art nouveau elements.

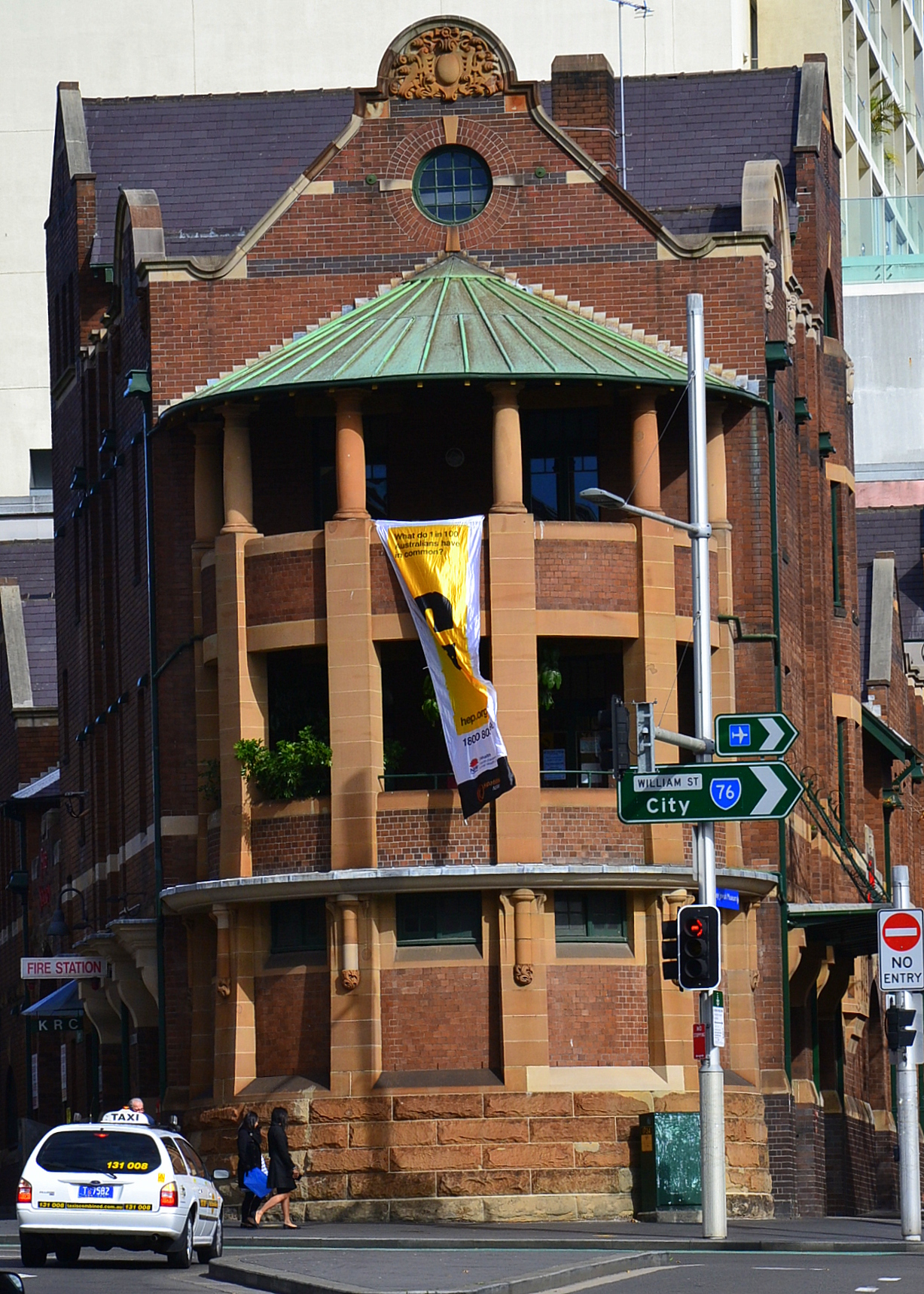
Darlinghurst Fire Station, Darlinghurst. Completed 1912; architect, Walter Liberty Vernon.

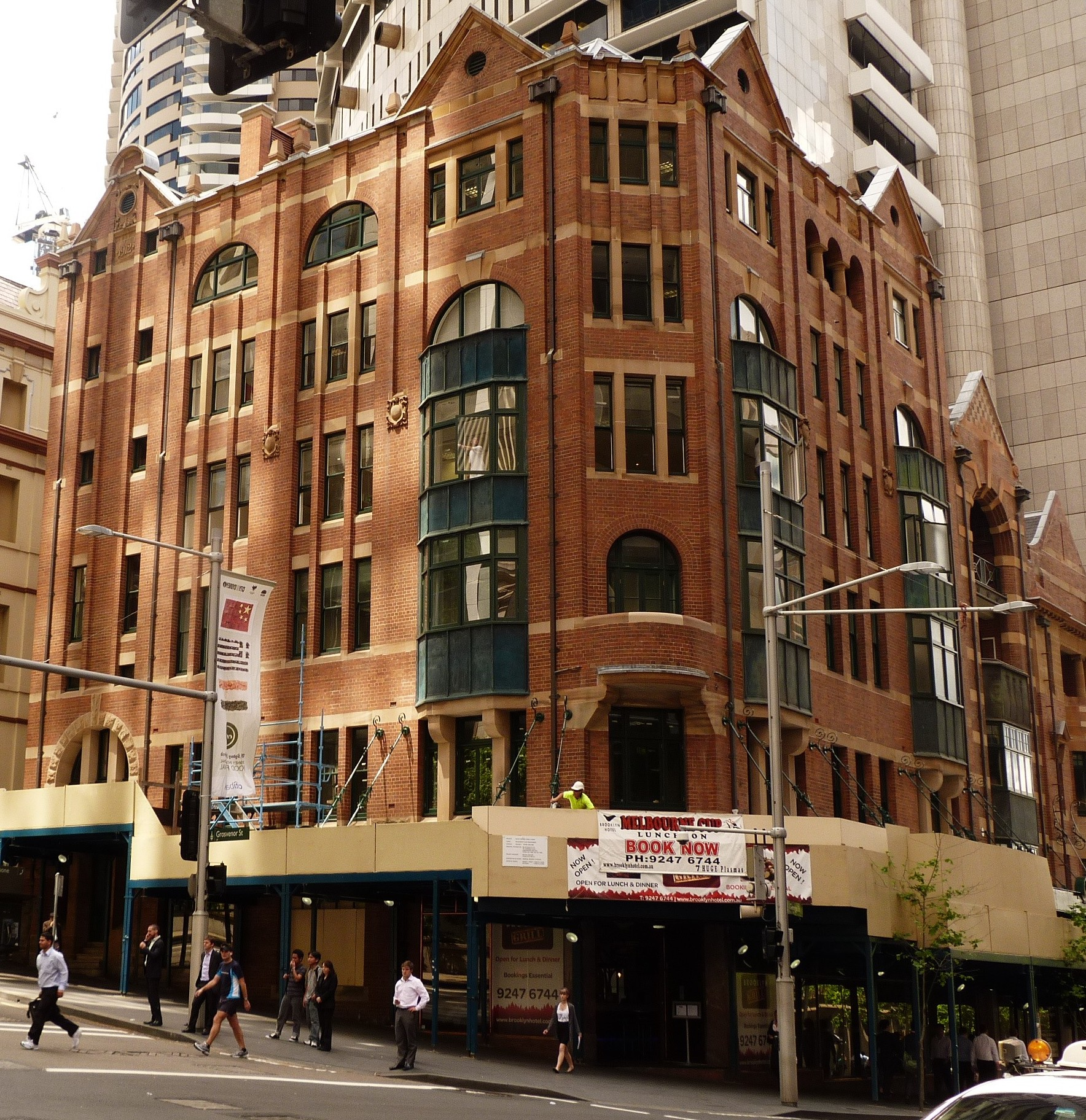
Chamber of Commerce Building, The Rocks. Completed 1912; architect, Walter Liberty Vernon.

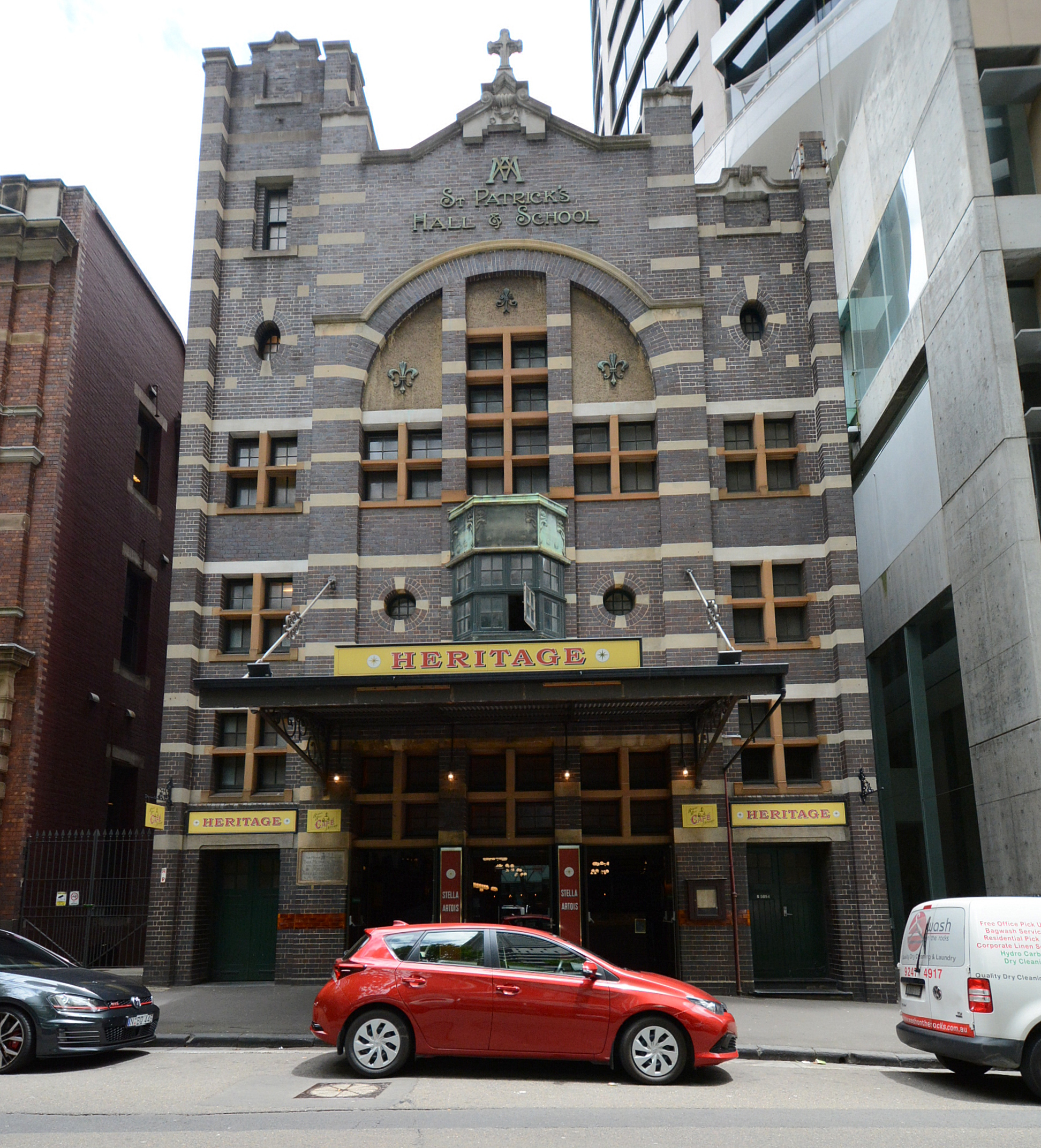
St Patrick's Hall, Sydney. Completed 1914; architects, Hennessy & Hennessy.

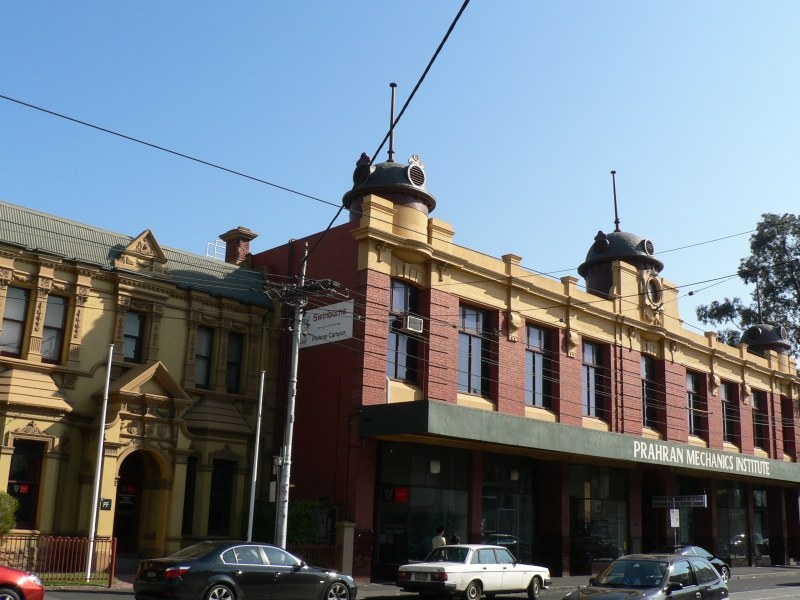
Prahran Mechanics' Institute, Prahran. Built c. 1915.

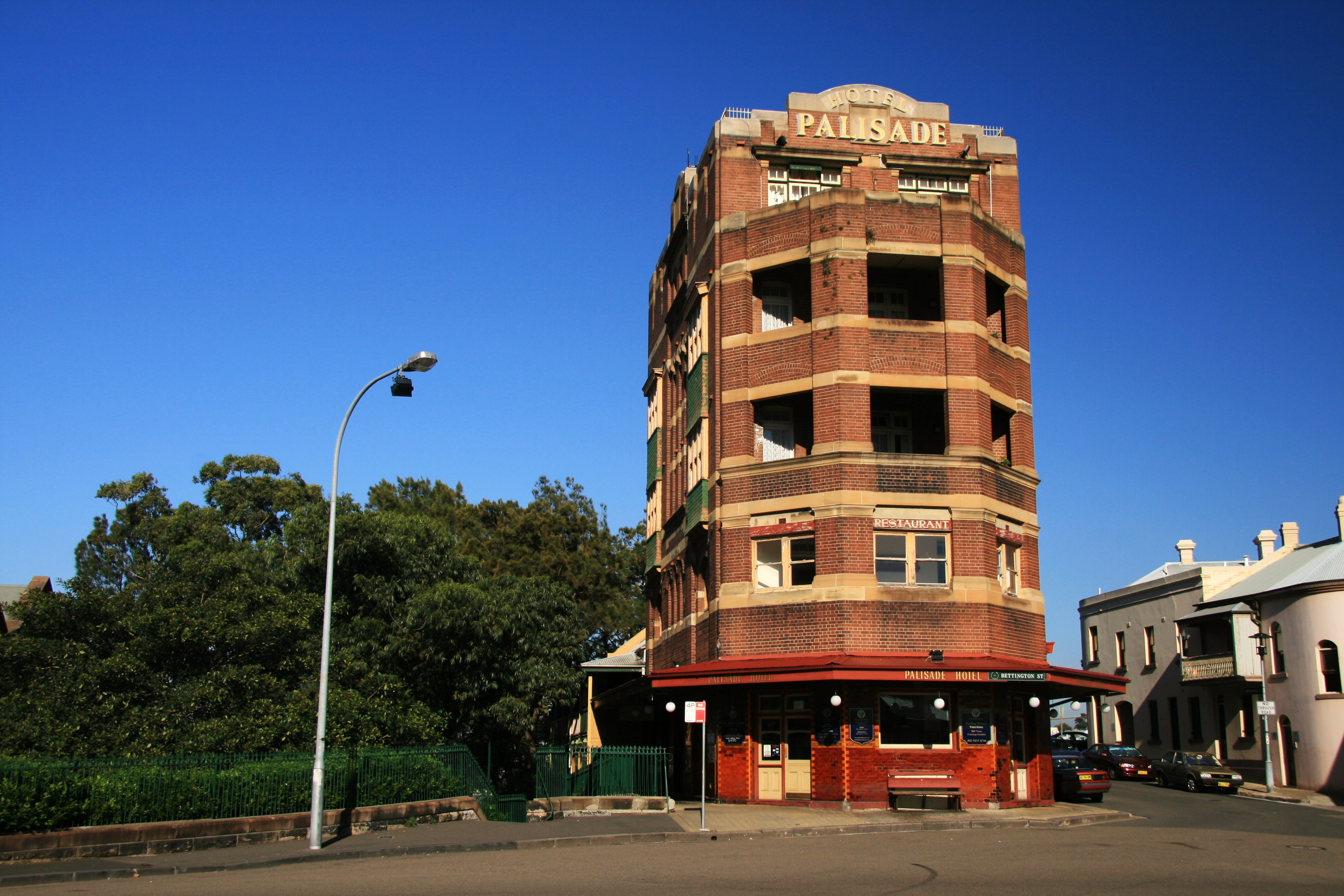
Palisade Hotel, Millers Point. Completed 1916; architect, H. D. Walsh.

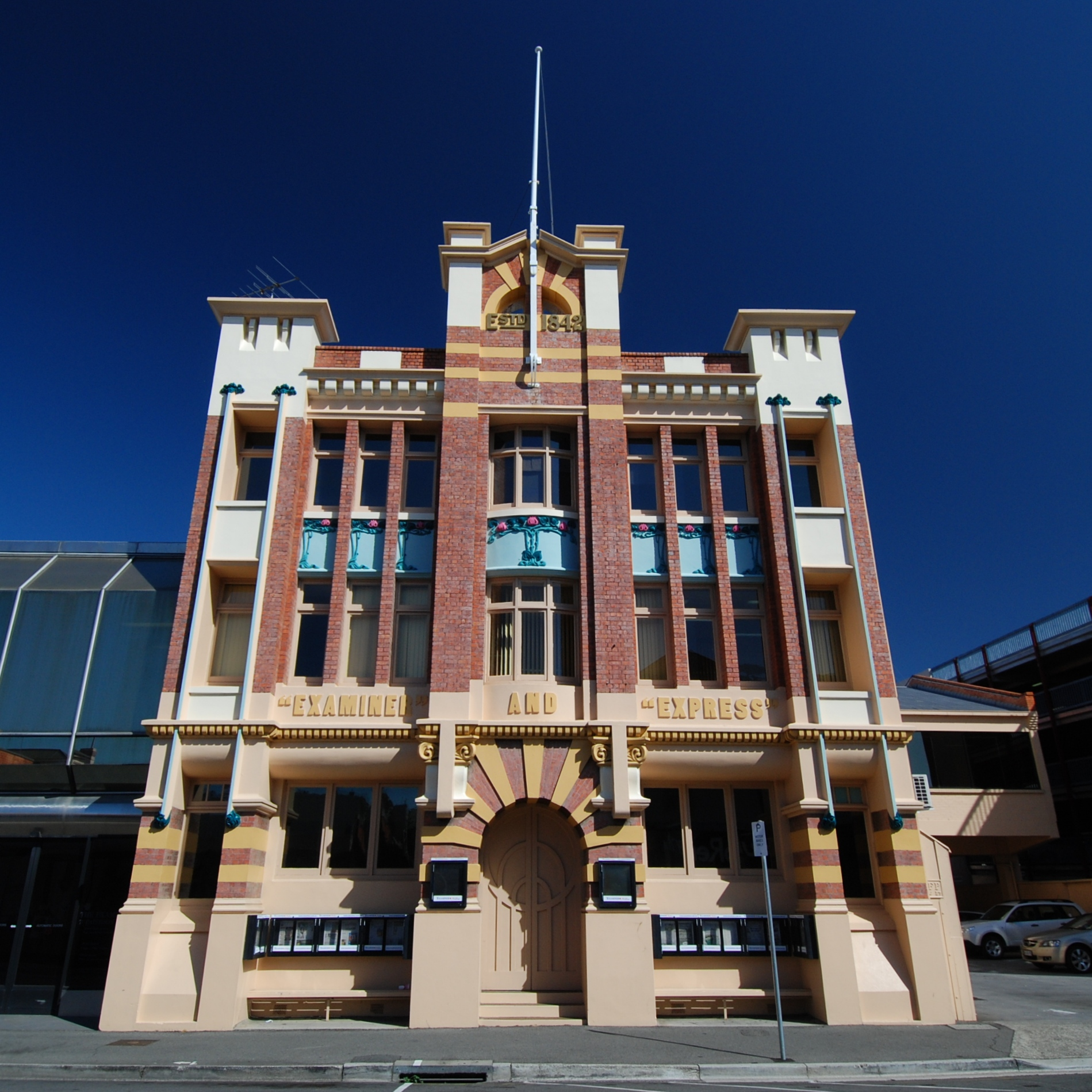
The Examiner building, Launceston.

=== Federation Arts and Crafts ===
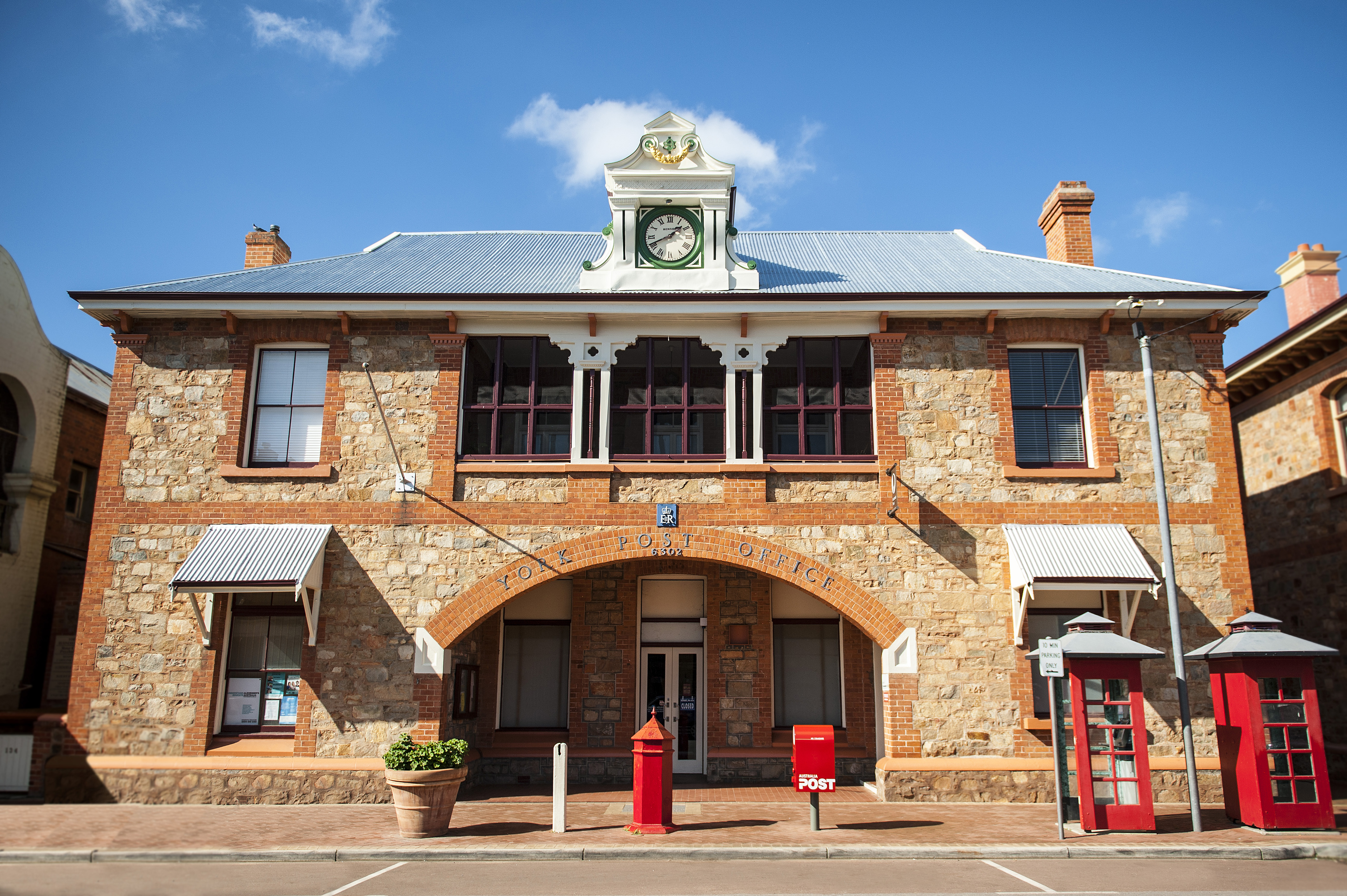
York Post Office. Built c. 1893; architect, George Temple-Poole.

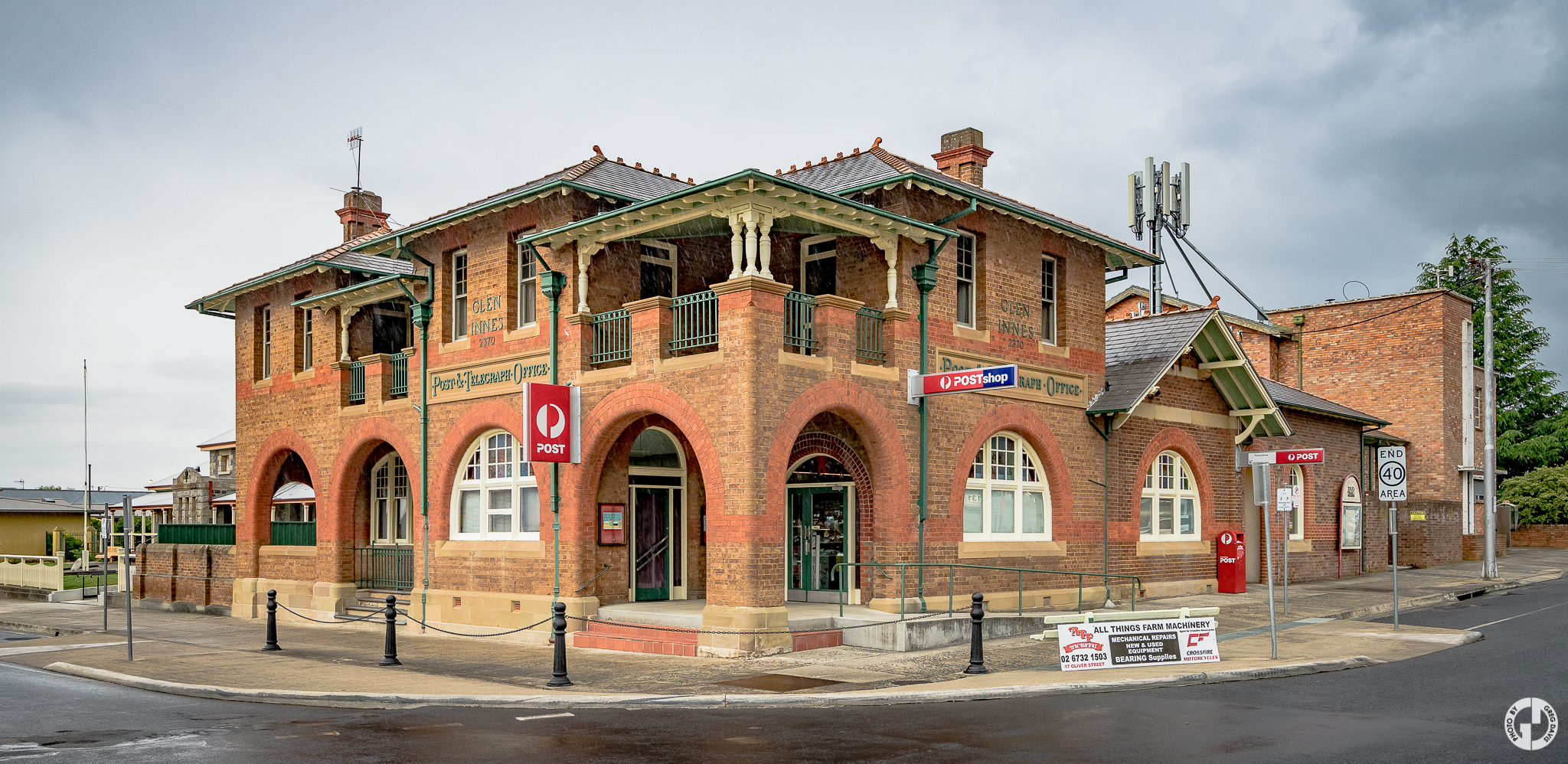
Glen Innes Post and Telegraph Office. Completed 1896; architect, Walter Liberty Vernon.

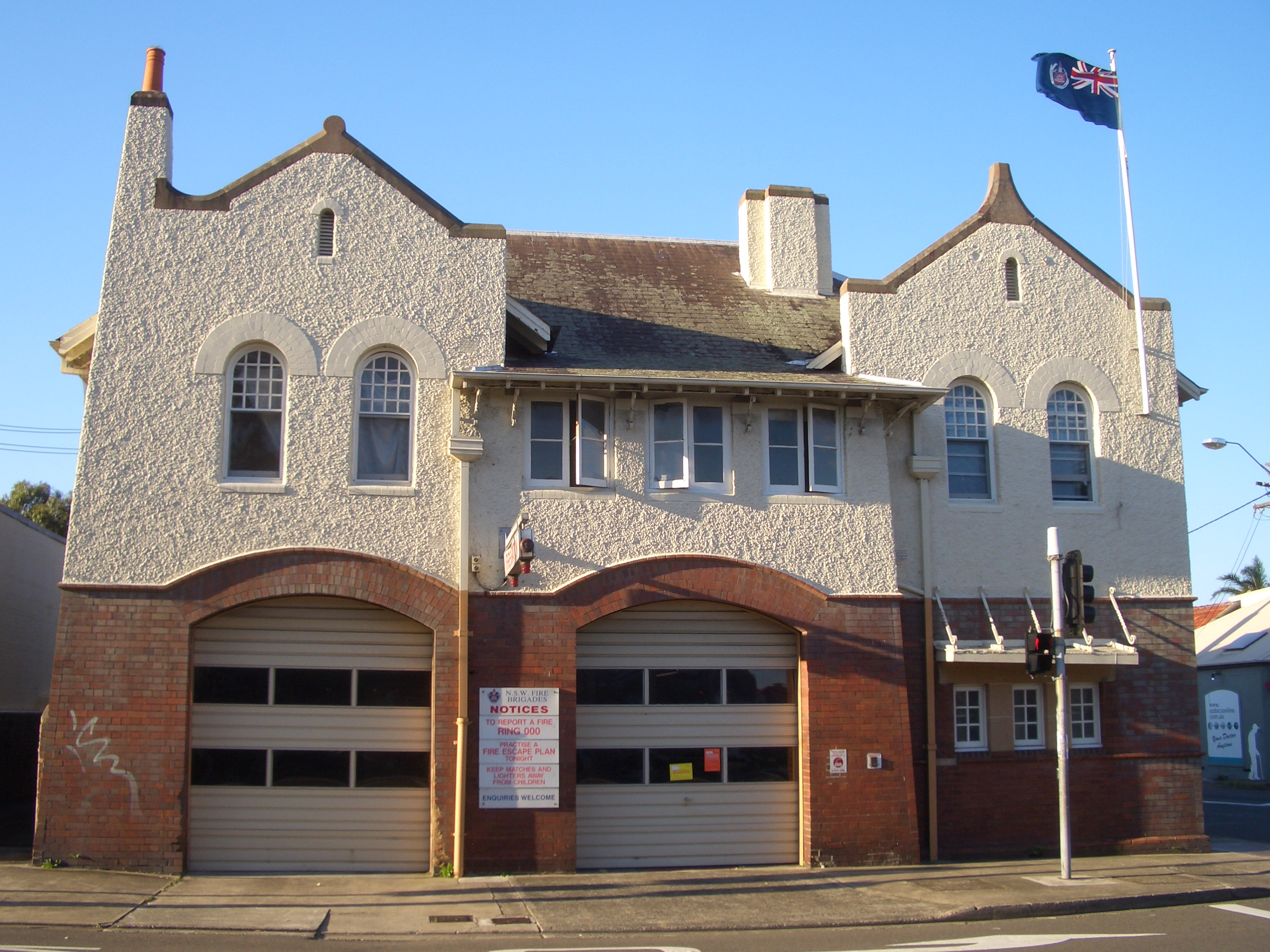
Fire station, Leichhardt. Completed 1906; architect, E.L Drew.

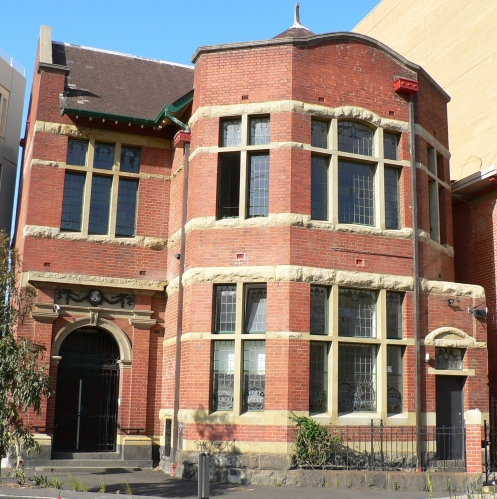
Former Post & Telegraph Offices, Windsor

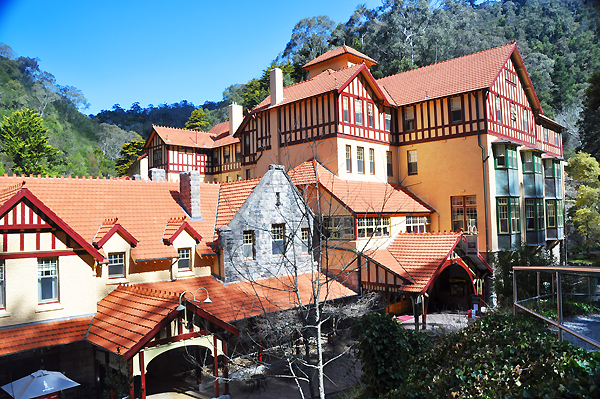
The Jenolan Caves House

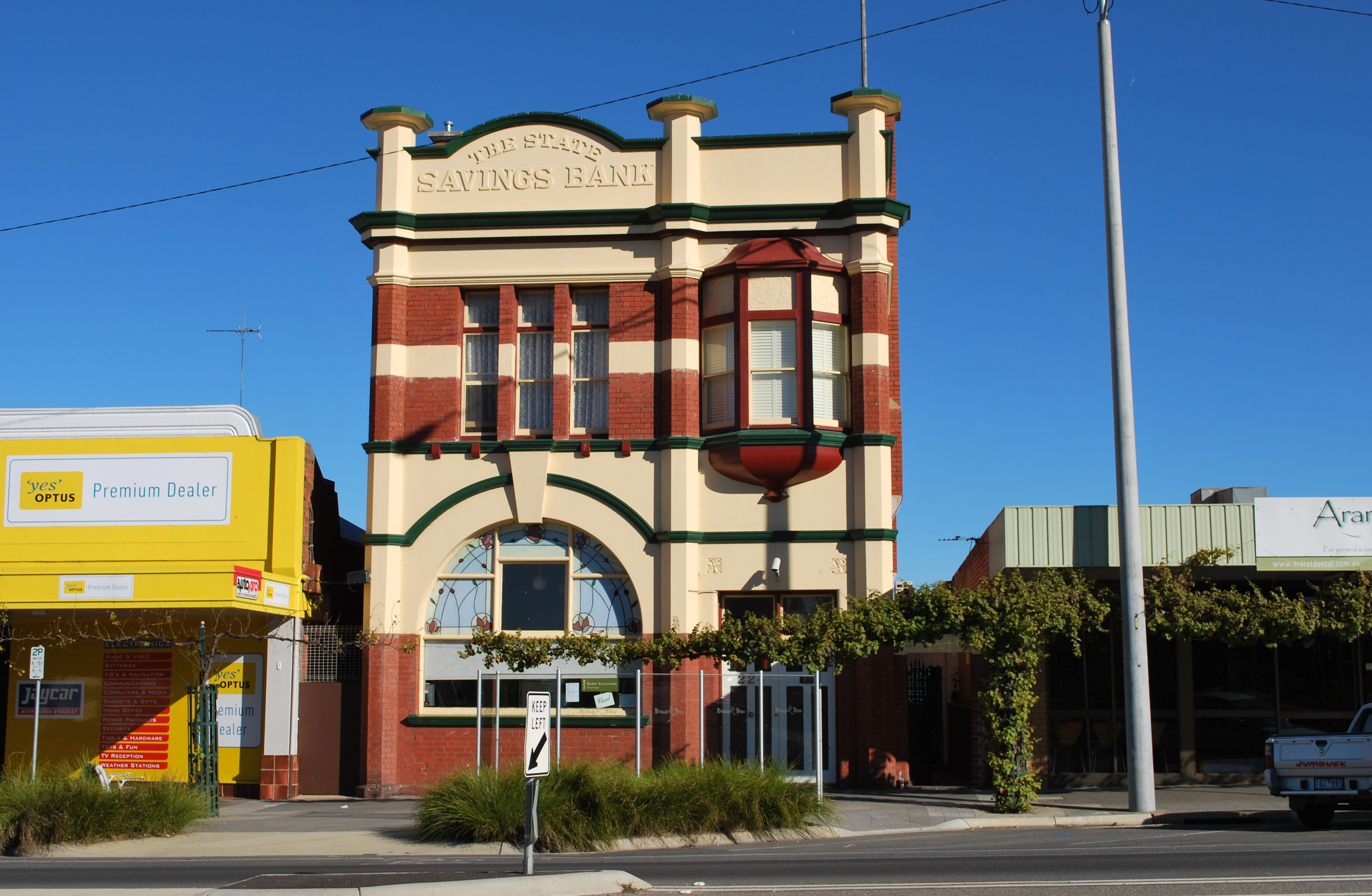
Former State Savings Bank, Ararat.

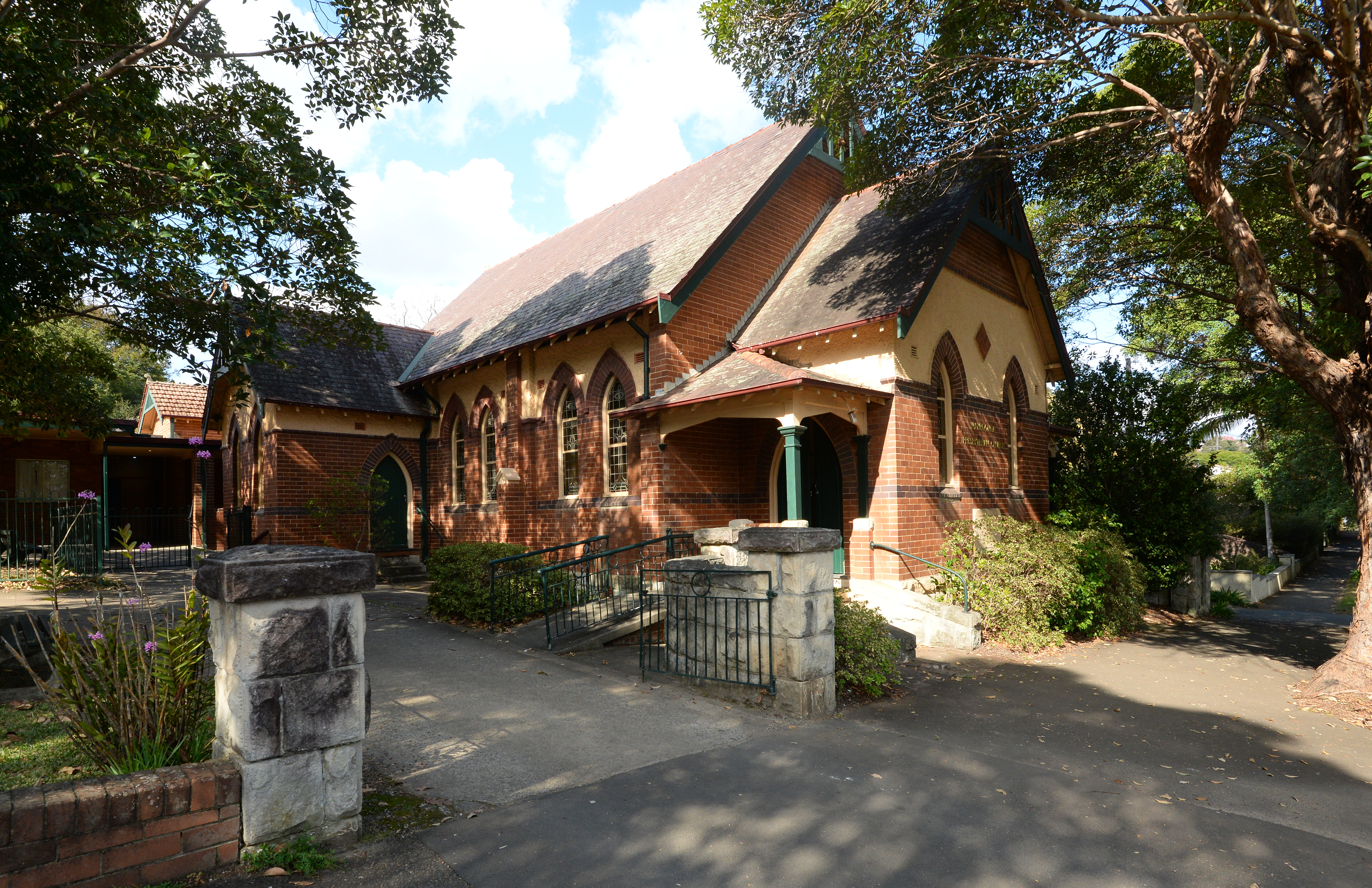
Presbyterian Church, Wahroonga. Built c. 1913.

== Inter-War period (c. 1915–c. 1940) ==
16 styles, each style name prefaced by "Inter-War":

Georgian Revival, Academic Classical, Free Classical, Beaux-Arts, Stripped Classical, Commercial Palazzo, Mediterranean, Spanish Mission, Chicagoesque, Functionalist & Modern, Art-Deco, Skyscraper Gothic, Romanesque, Interwar Gothic, Old English, California Bungalow

=== Inter-war Georgian Revival ===
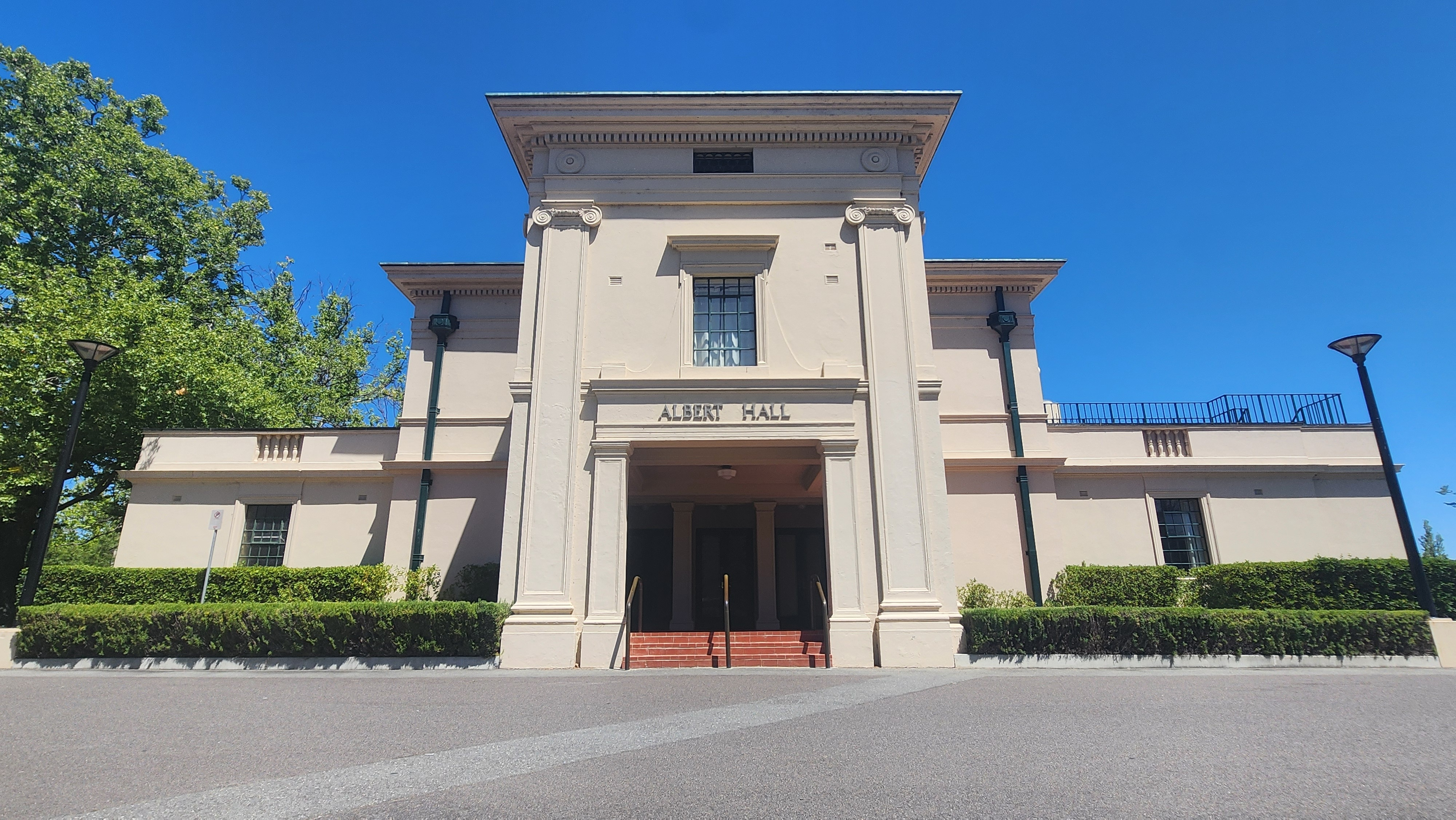
Albert Hall, Canberra, opened 1928

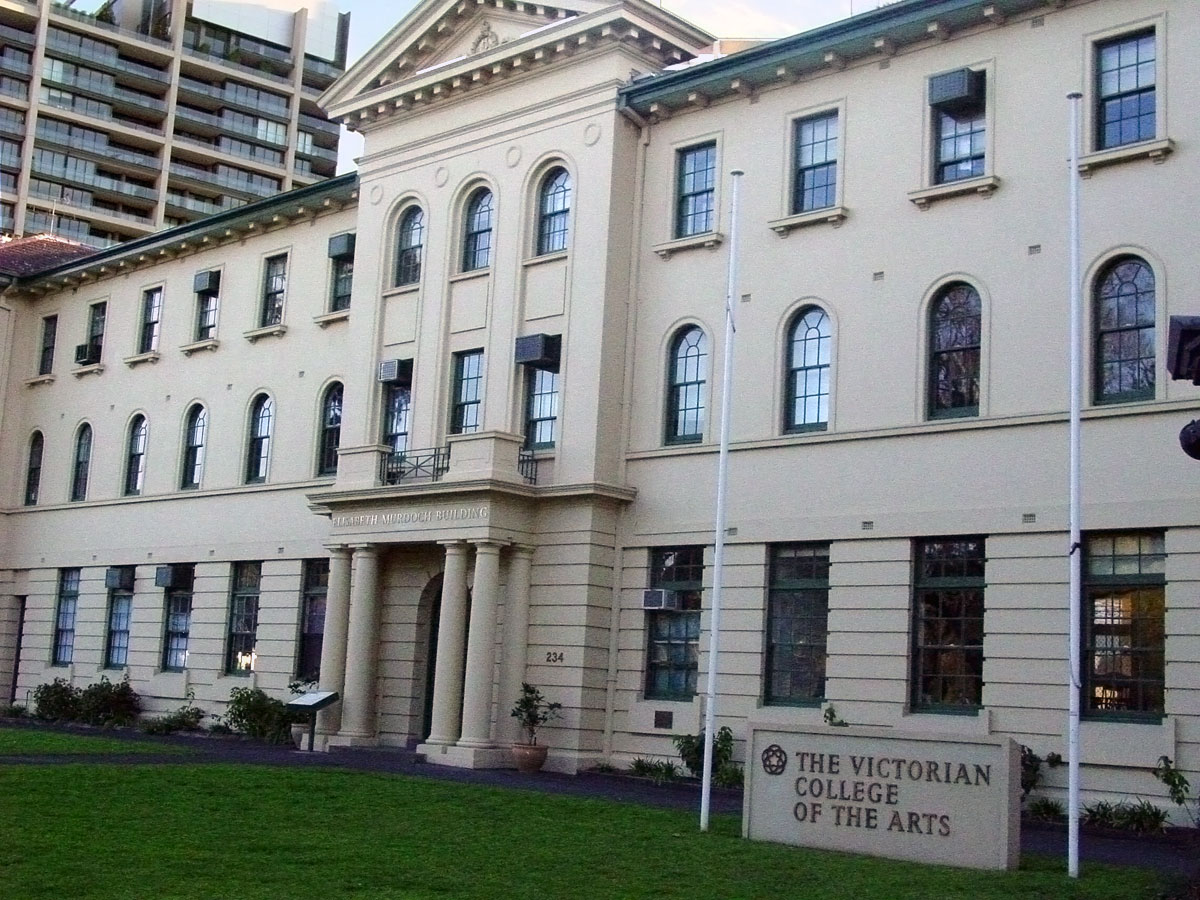
Elizabeth Murdoch Building, Victorian College of the Arts, Melbourne

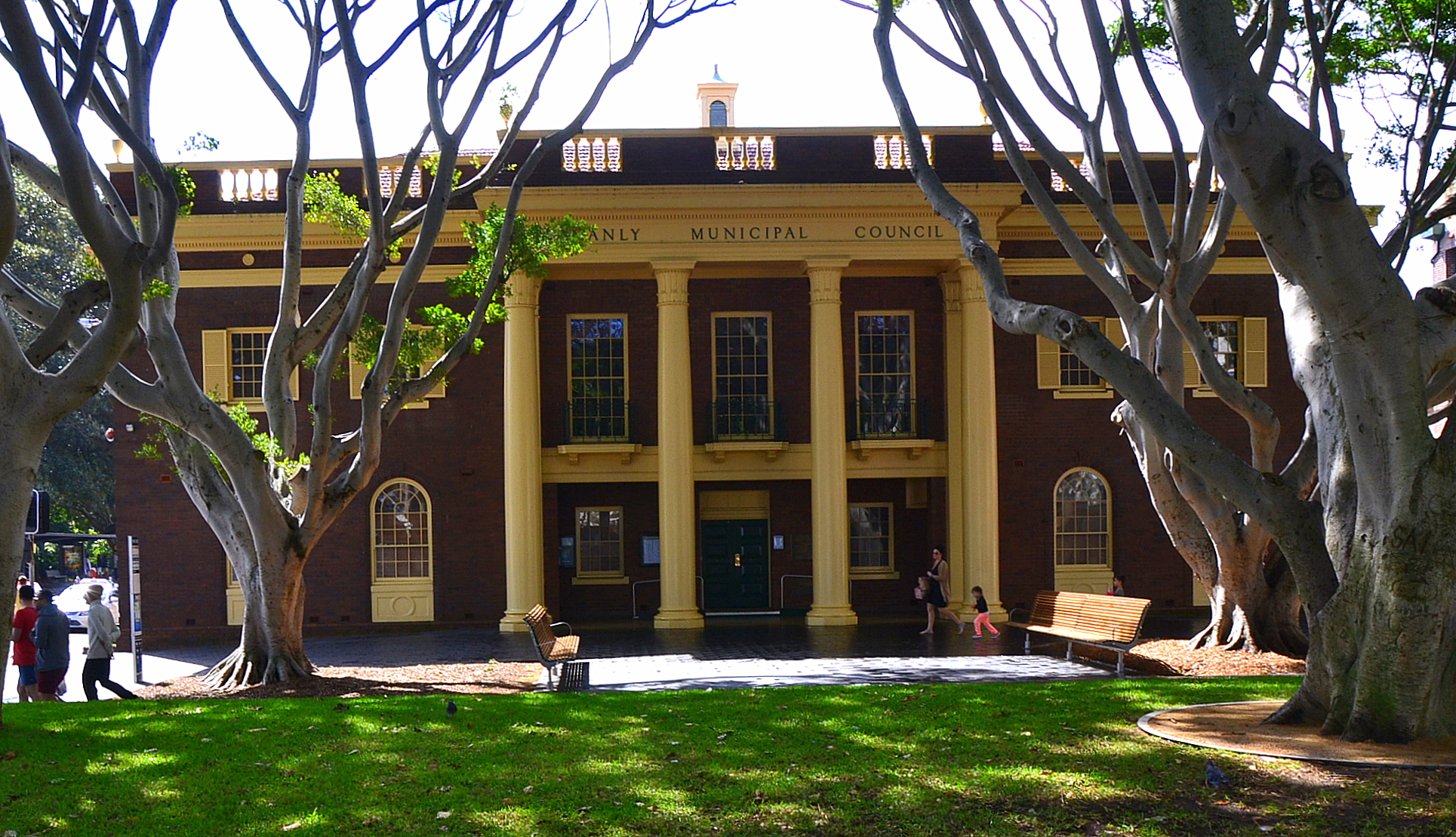
Manly Town Hall

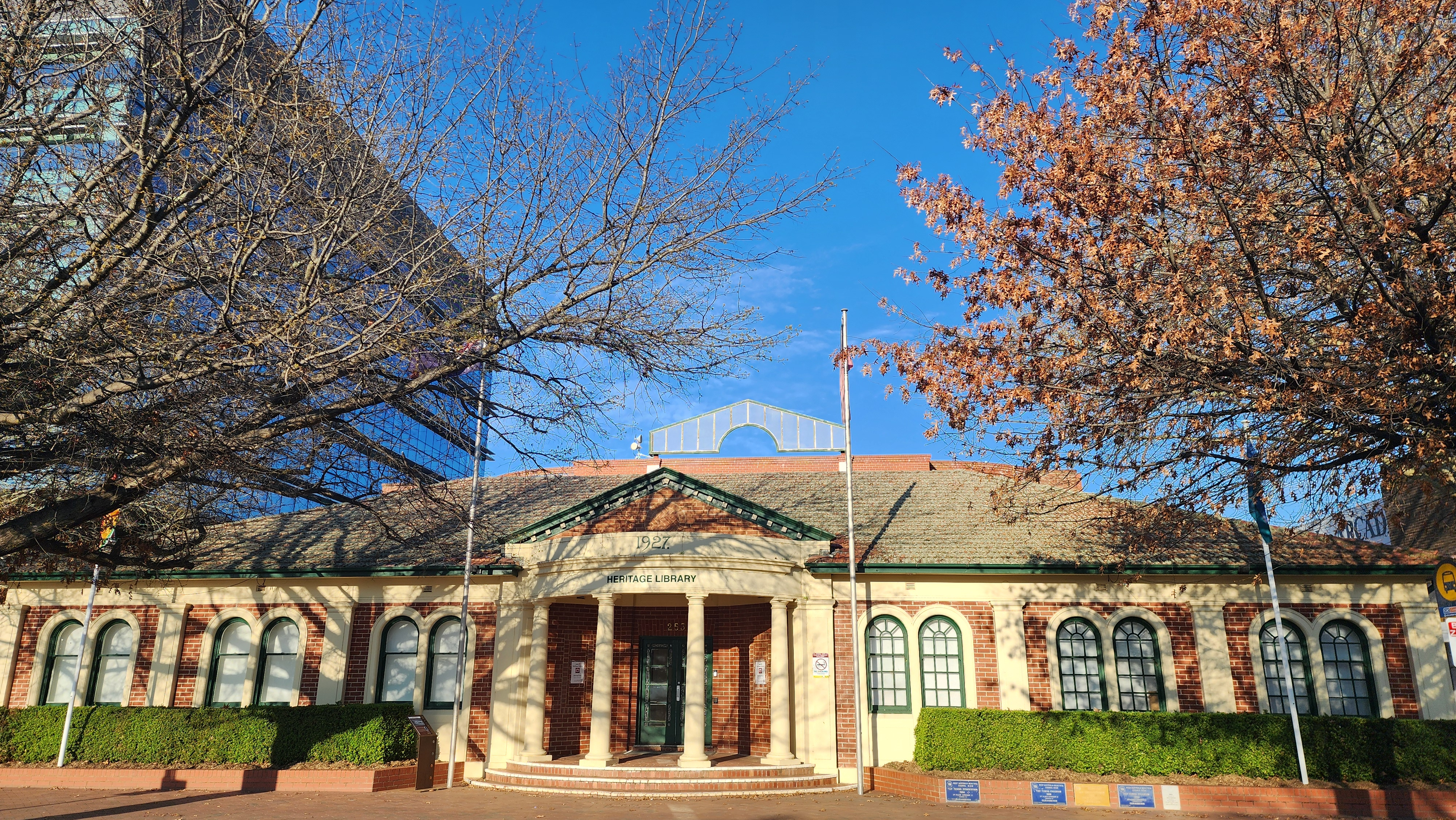
Queanbeyan City Council Chambers, Queanbeyan. Completed 1927; architect, J. W. Sproule.

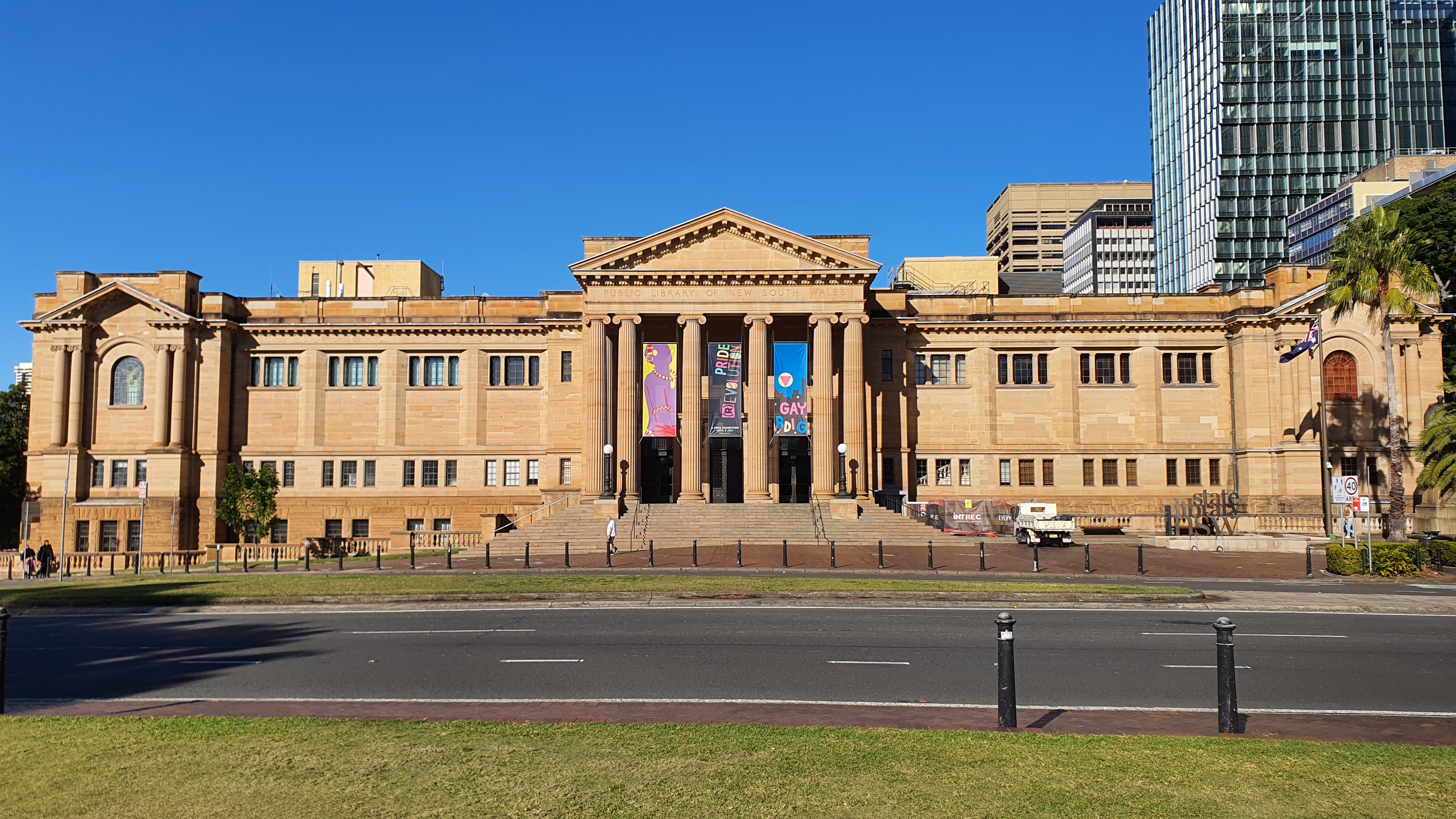
Library of New South Wales, Sydney, built 1939-1941

==== Inter-war Academic Classical ====
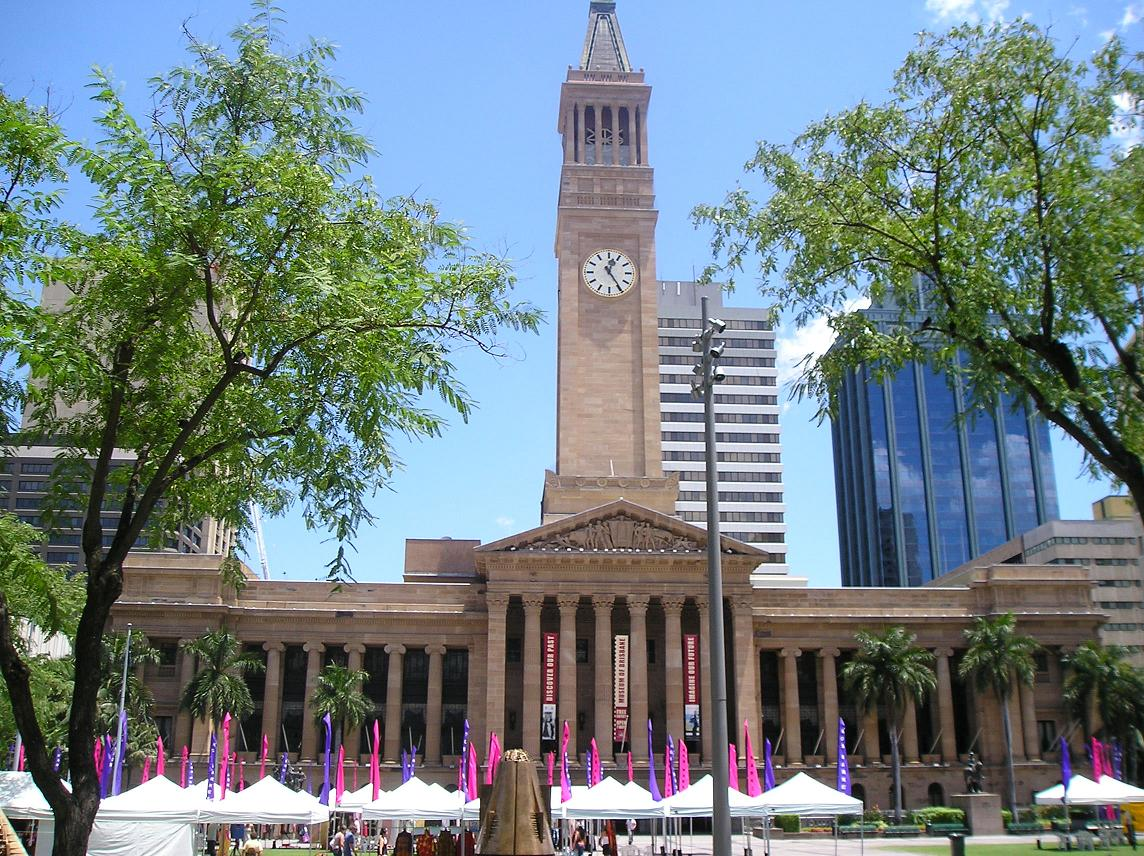
Brisbane City Hall; opened in 1930

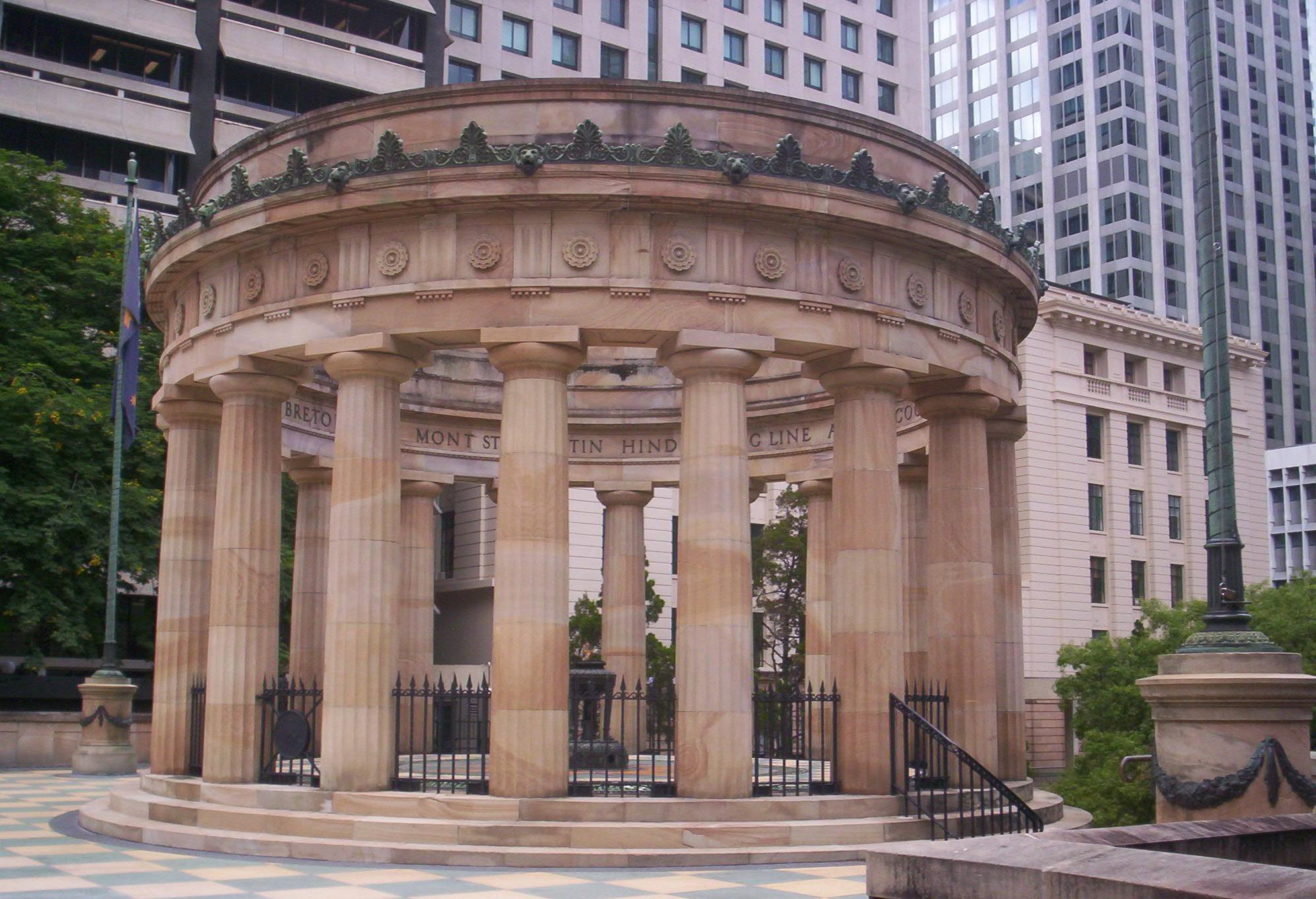
Shrine of Remembrance, Brisbane; completed in 1930

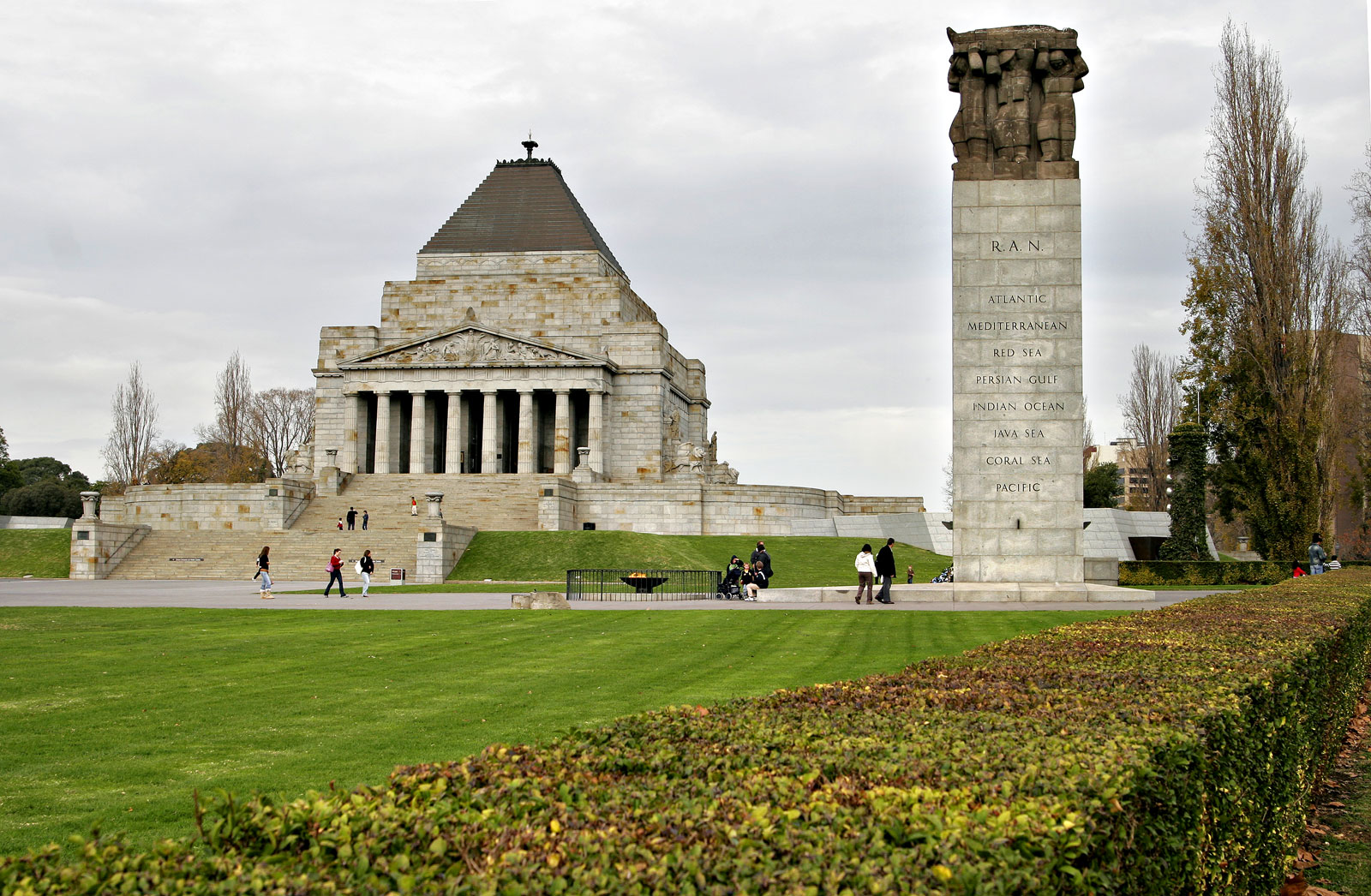
Shrine of Remembrance, Melbourne; completed in 1934

==== Inter-war Free Classical ====
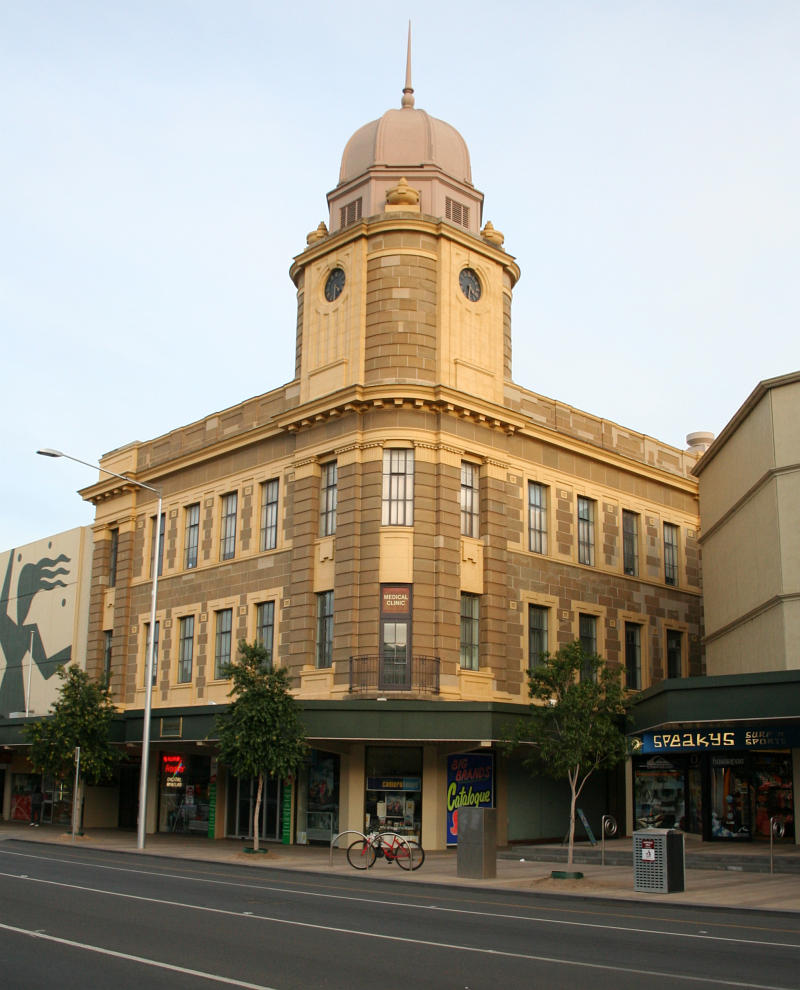
CML Building, Geelong; completed in 1923

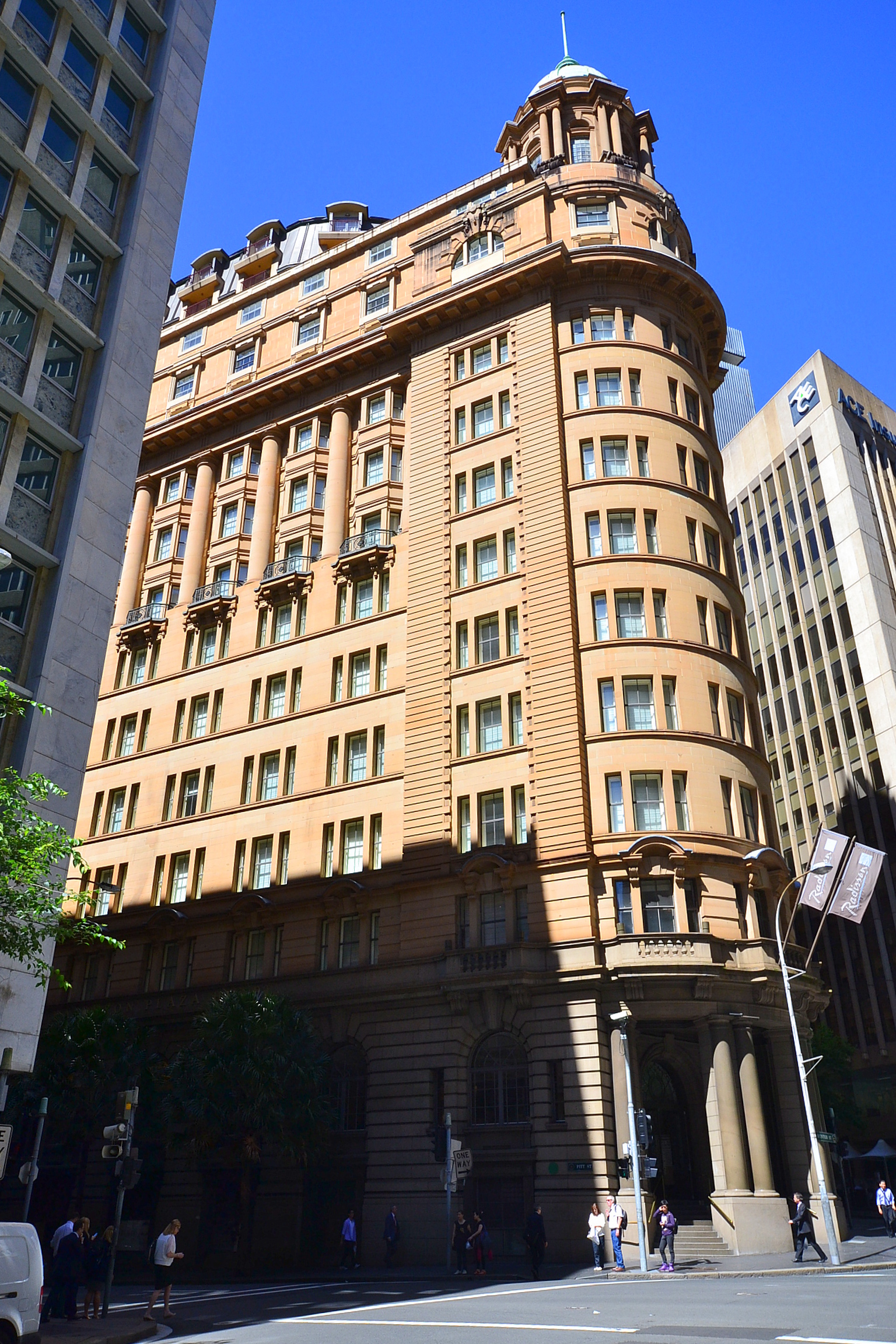
Former Sydney Morning Herald building, Pitt Street, Sydney. Completed 1920s

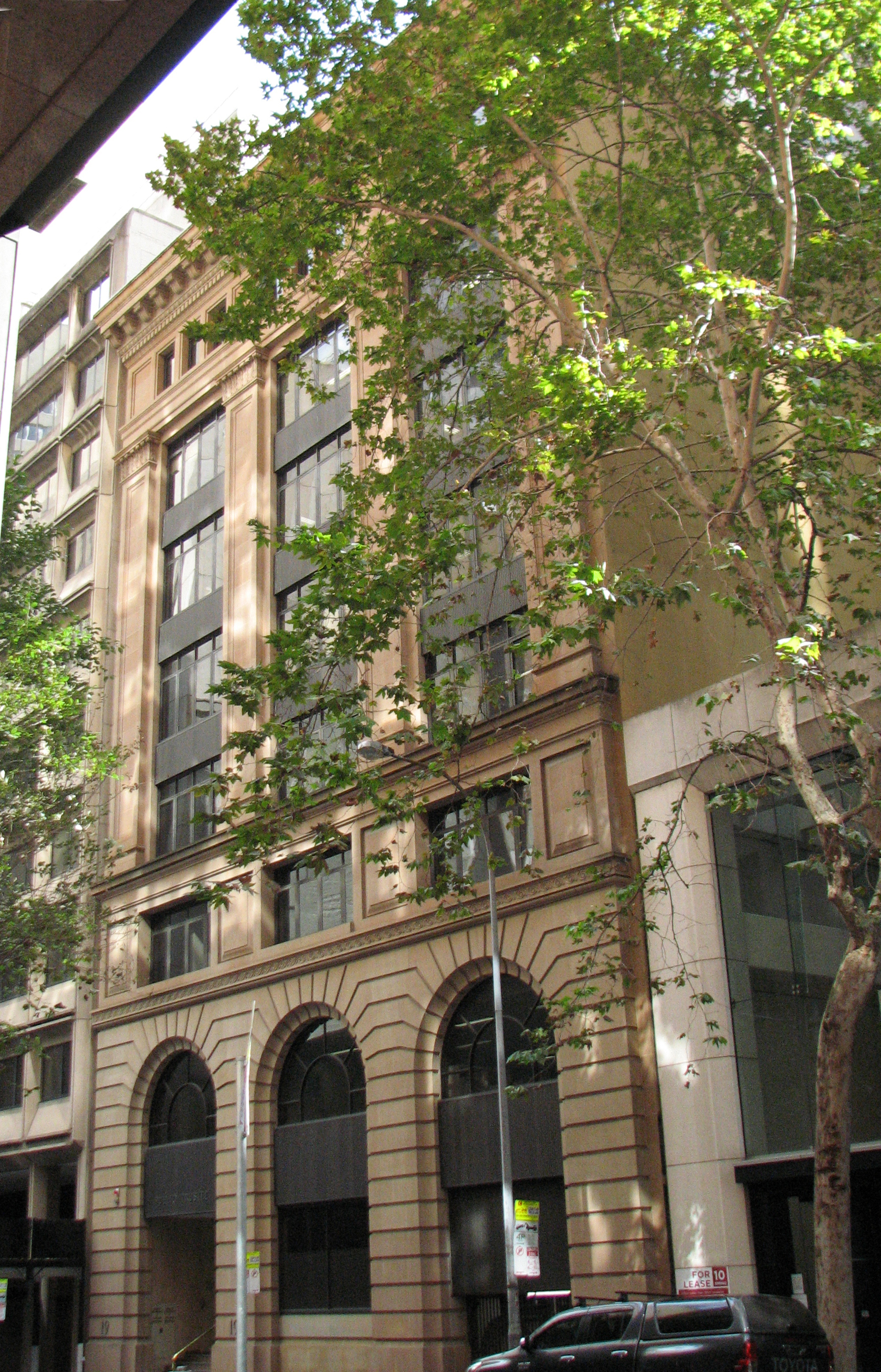
Public Trust Office, Sydney. Completed 1926

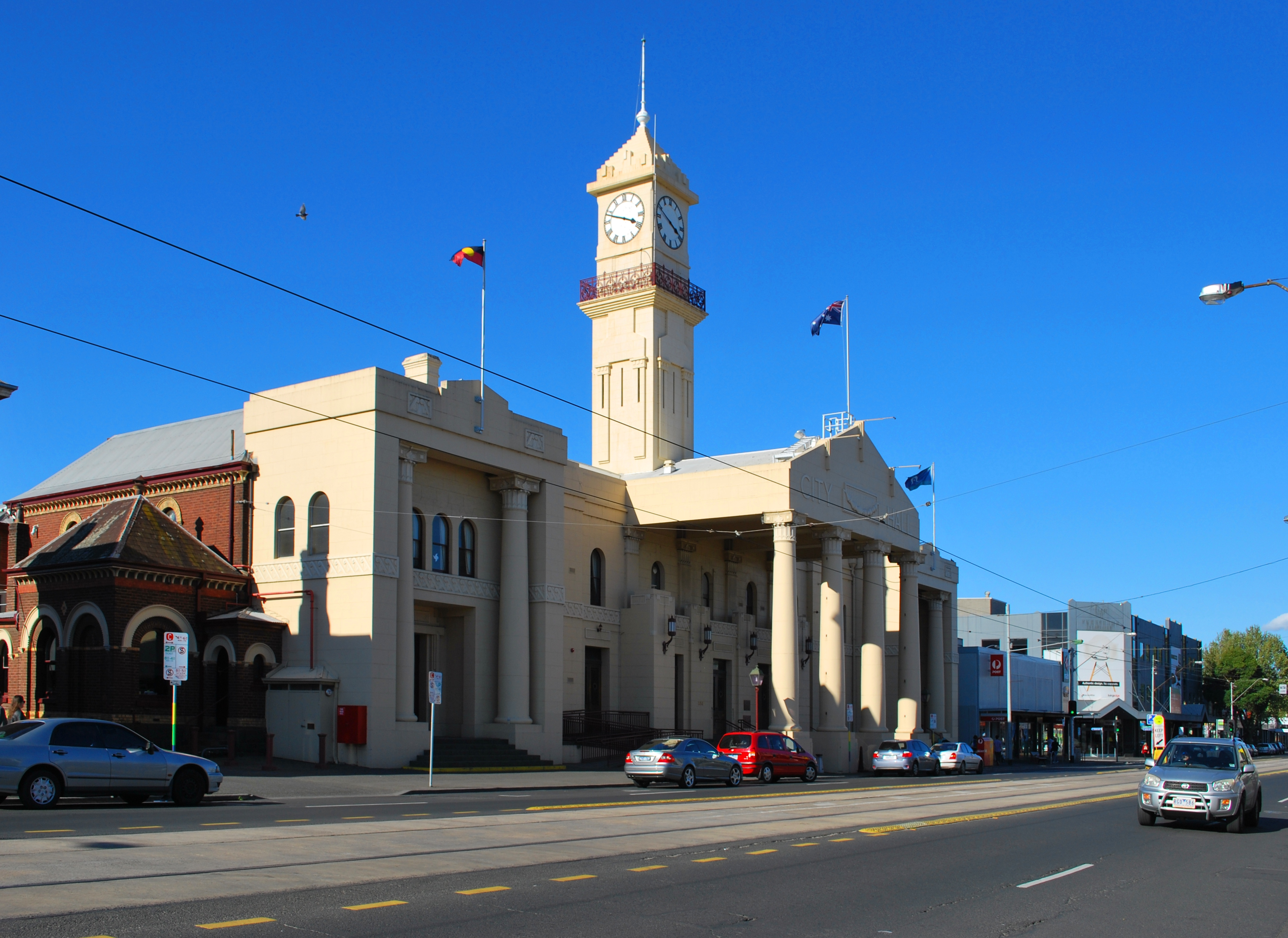
Richmond Town Hall, Melbourne. Remodeled 1934-36; architect, Harry R. Johnson.

=== Inter-war Beaux Arts ===
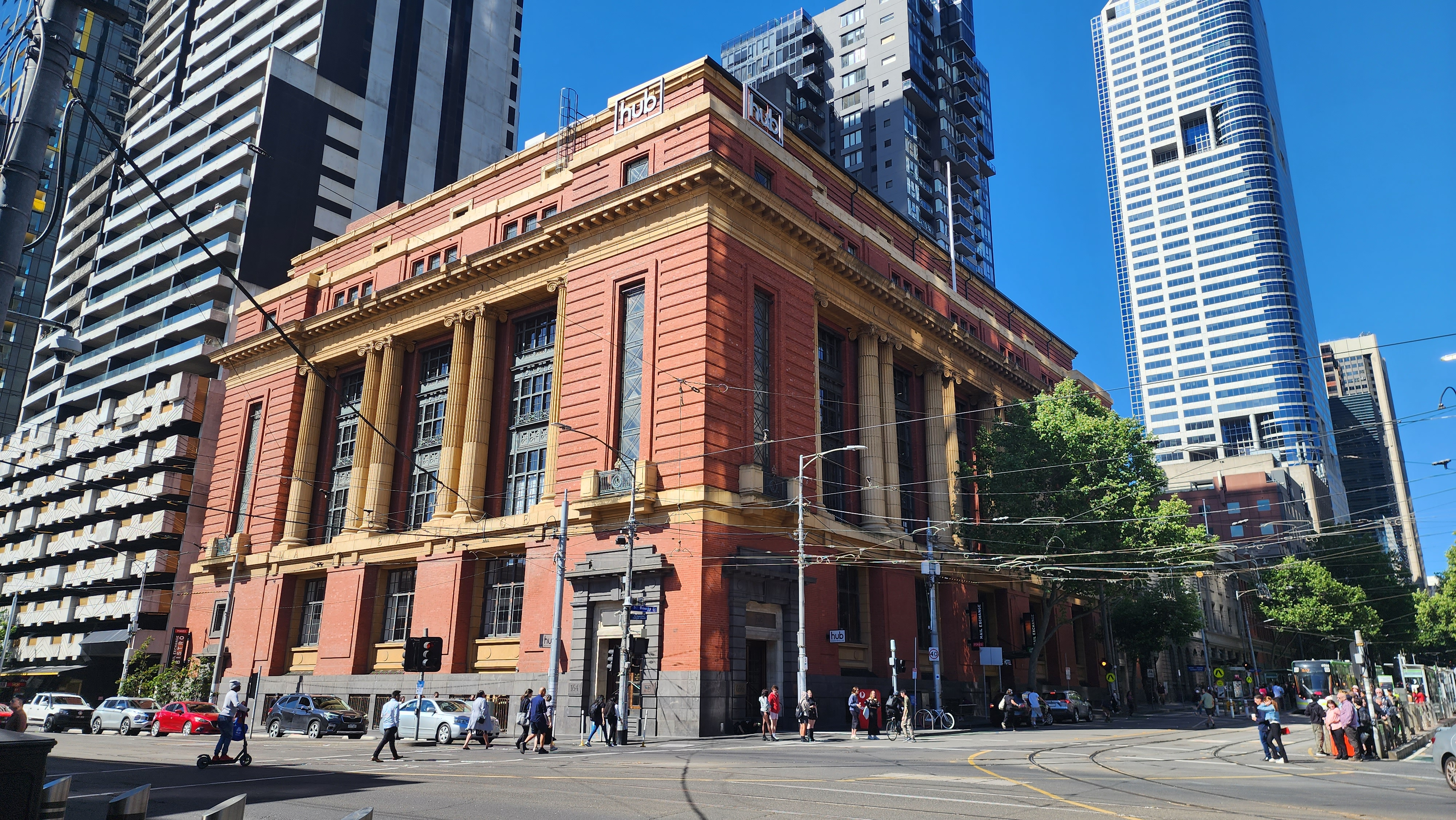
Former Melbourne Mail Exchange, Bourke Street, Melbourne; completed in 1917

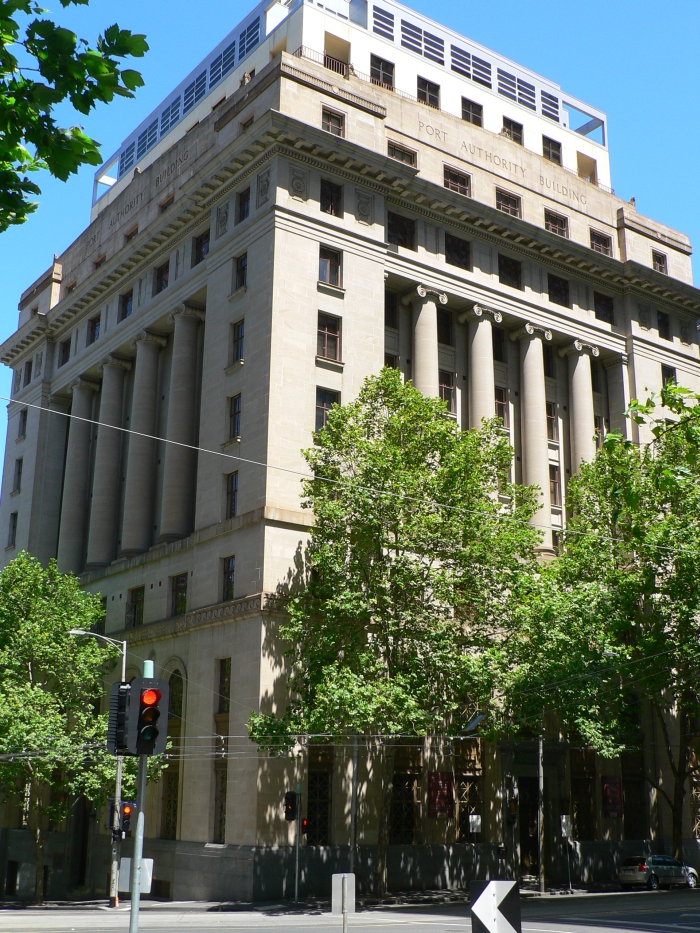
Former Port Authority Building, Market Street, Melbourne

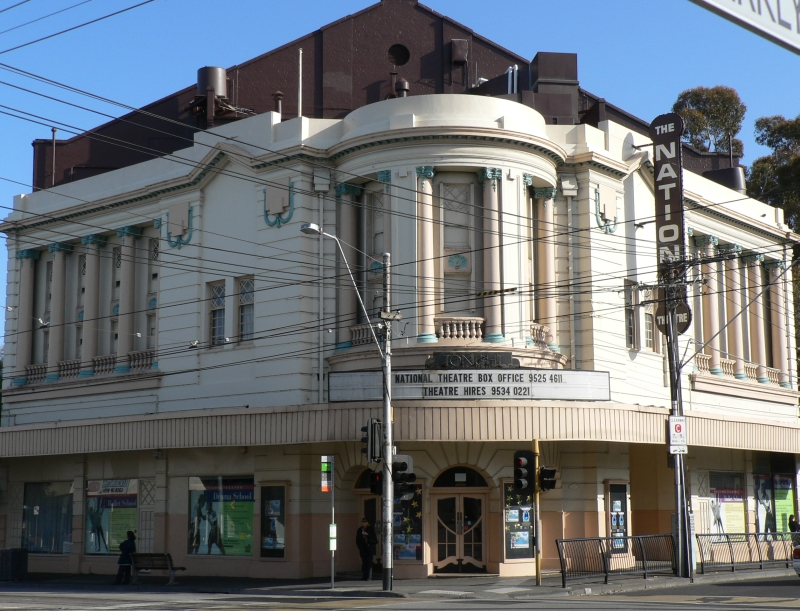
National Theatre. St Kilda; completed 1929

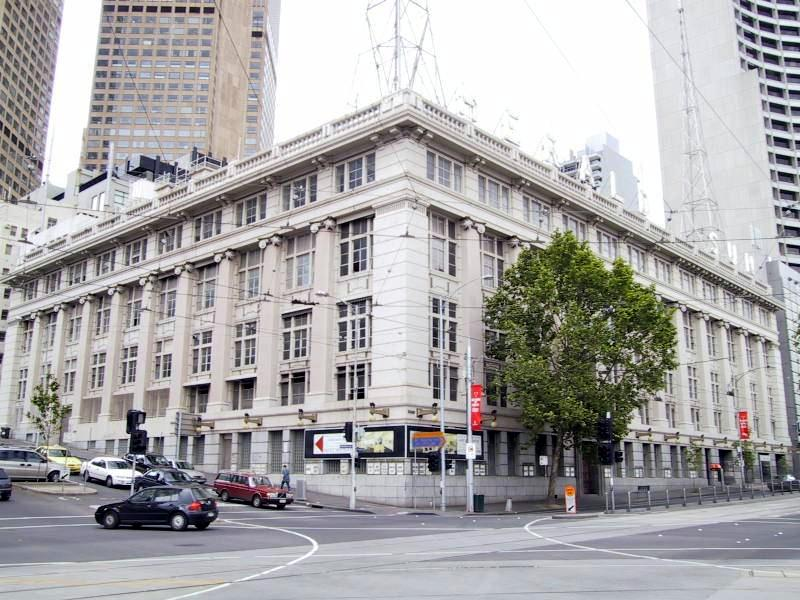
Herald and Weekly Times Building, Flinders Street, Melbourne

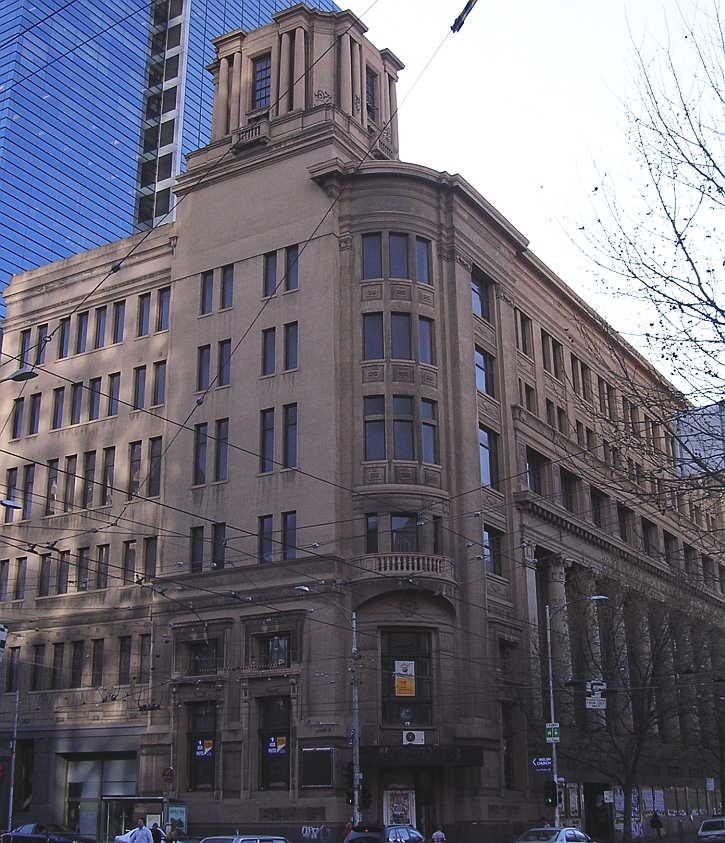
Argus Building. LaTrobe Street, Melbourne; completed 1927. Features large giant order columns with Egyptian decorative motifs

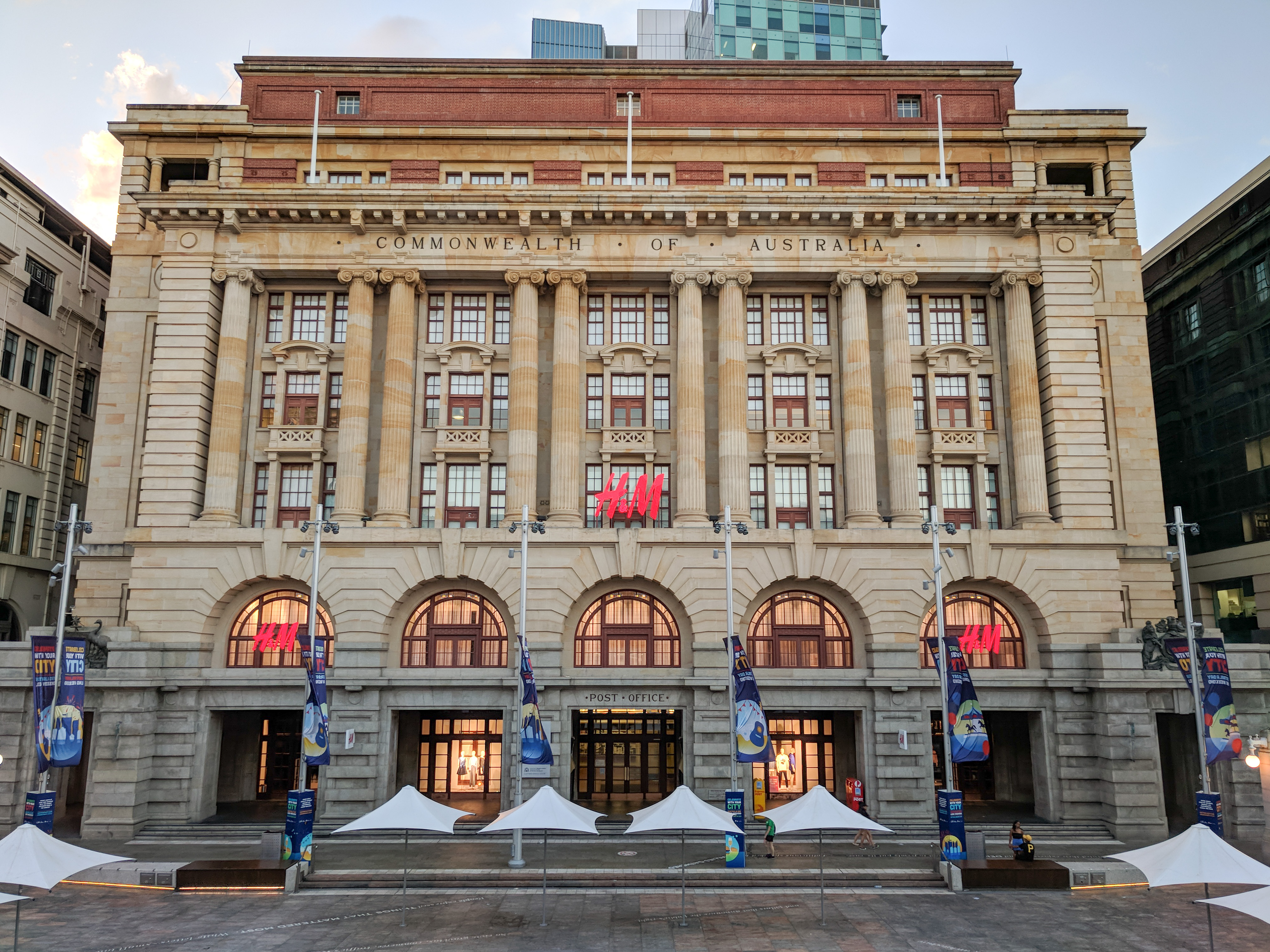
General Post Office, Perth; completed 1923

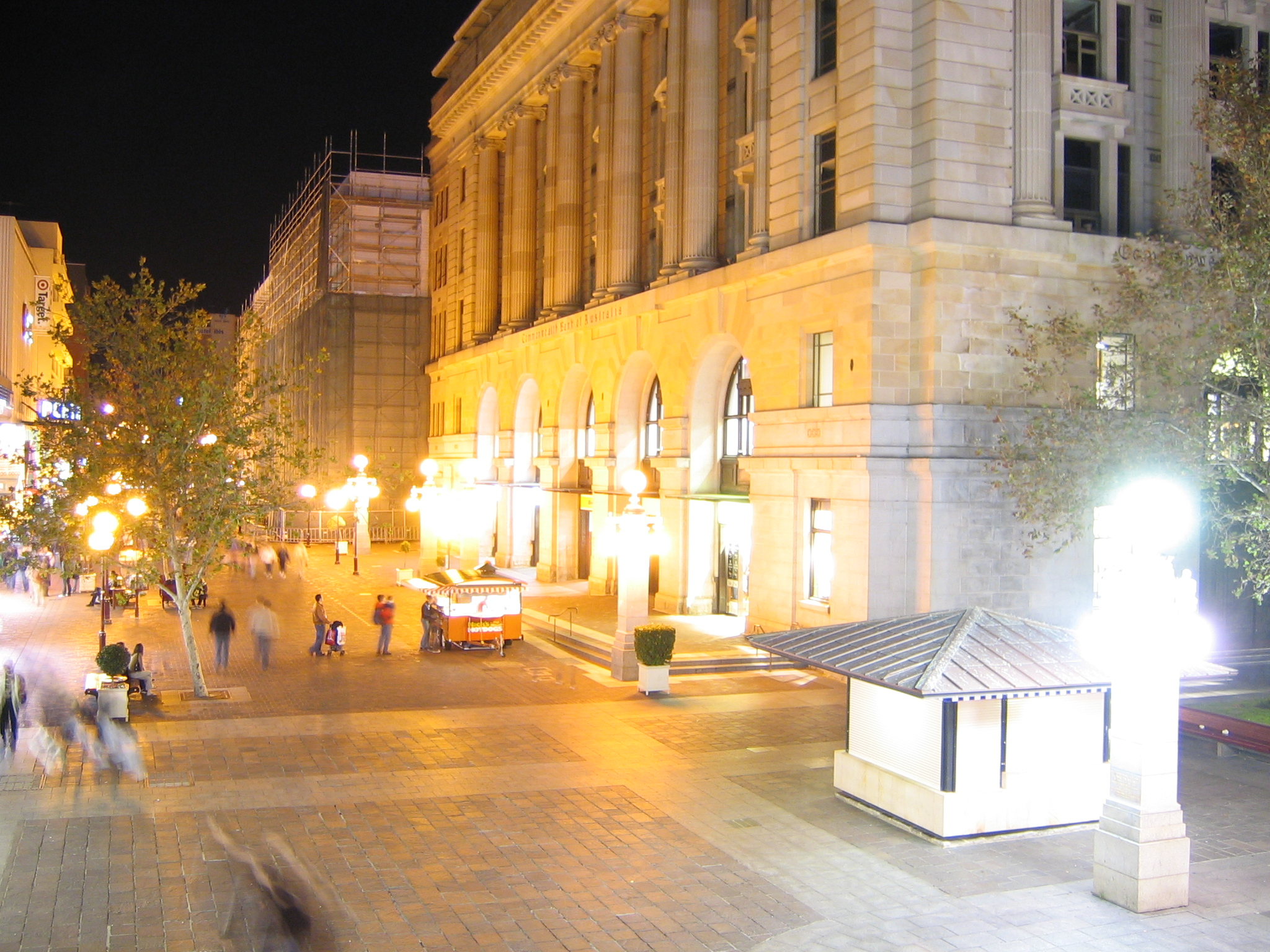
Commonwealth Bank building, Forrest Place, Perth; completed 1933

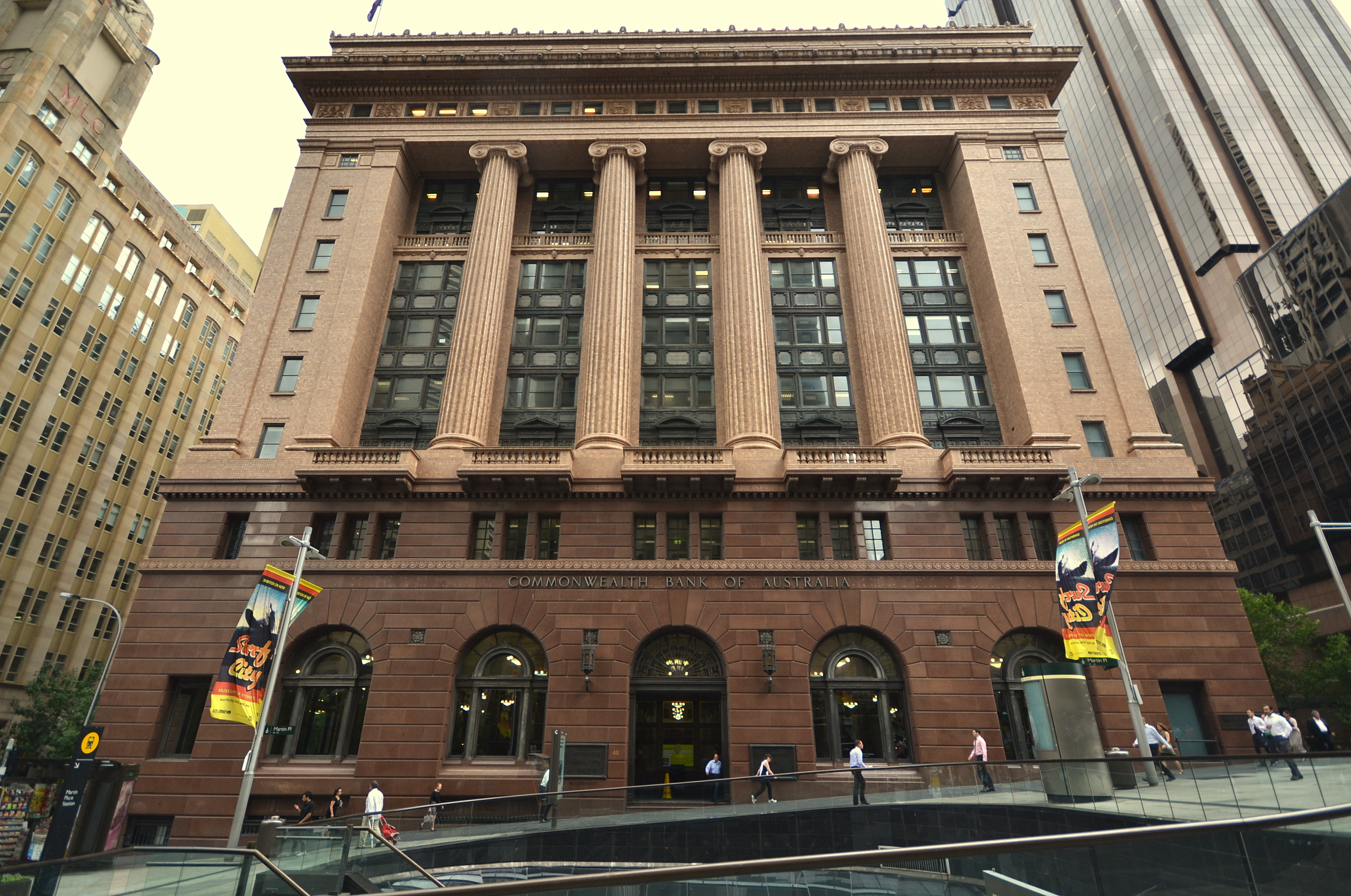
Commonwealth Bank building, Martin Place, Sydney. Completed 1928

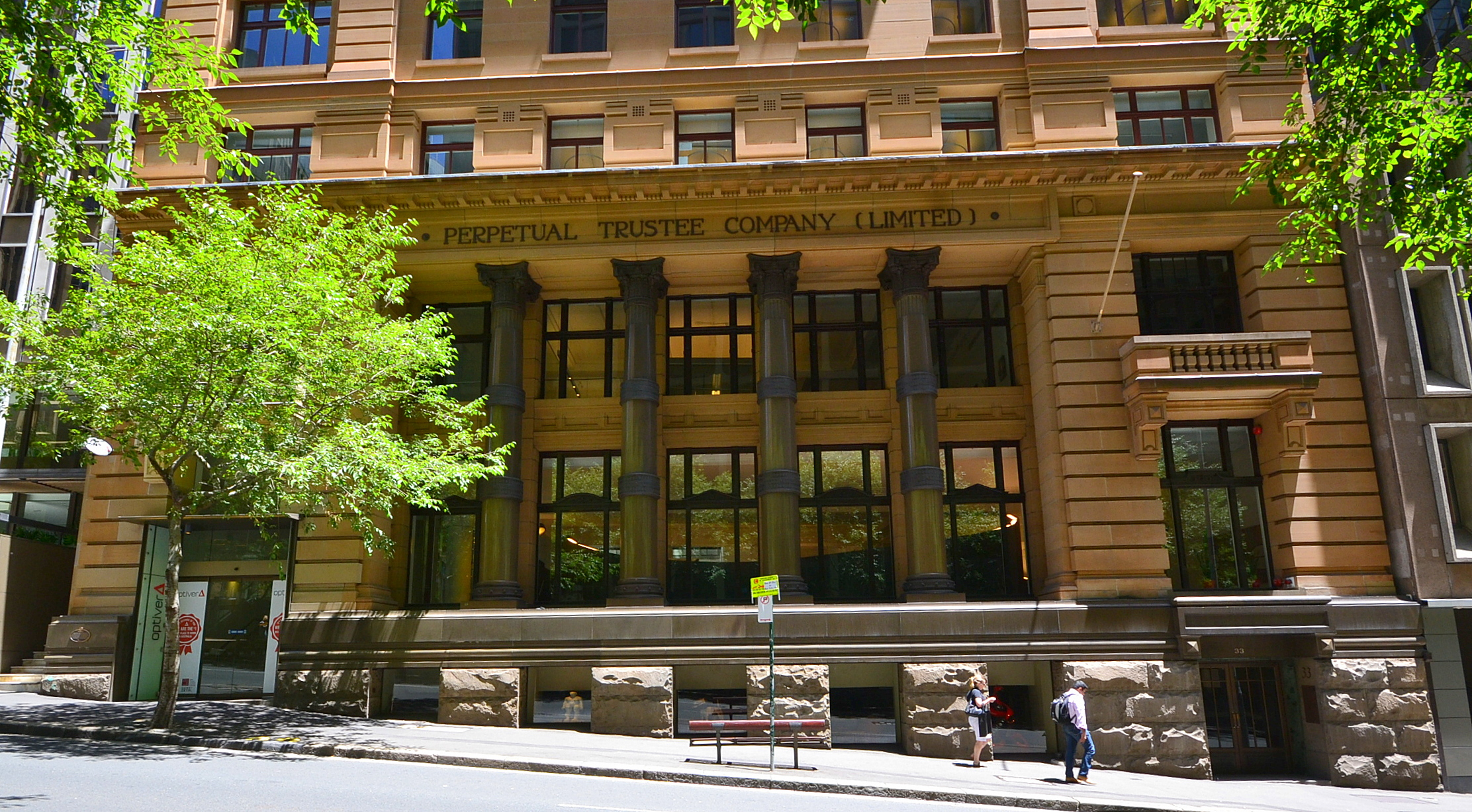
Perpetual Trustee building, Sydney. Completed 1917

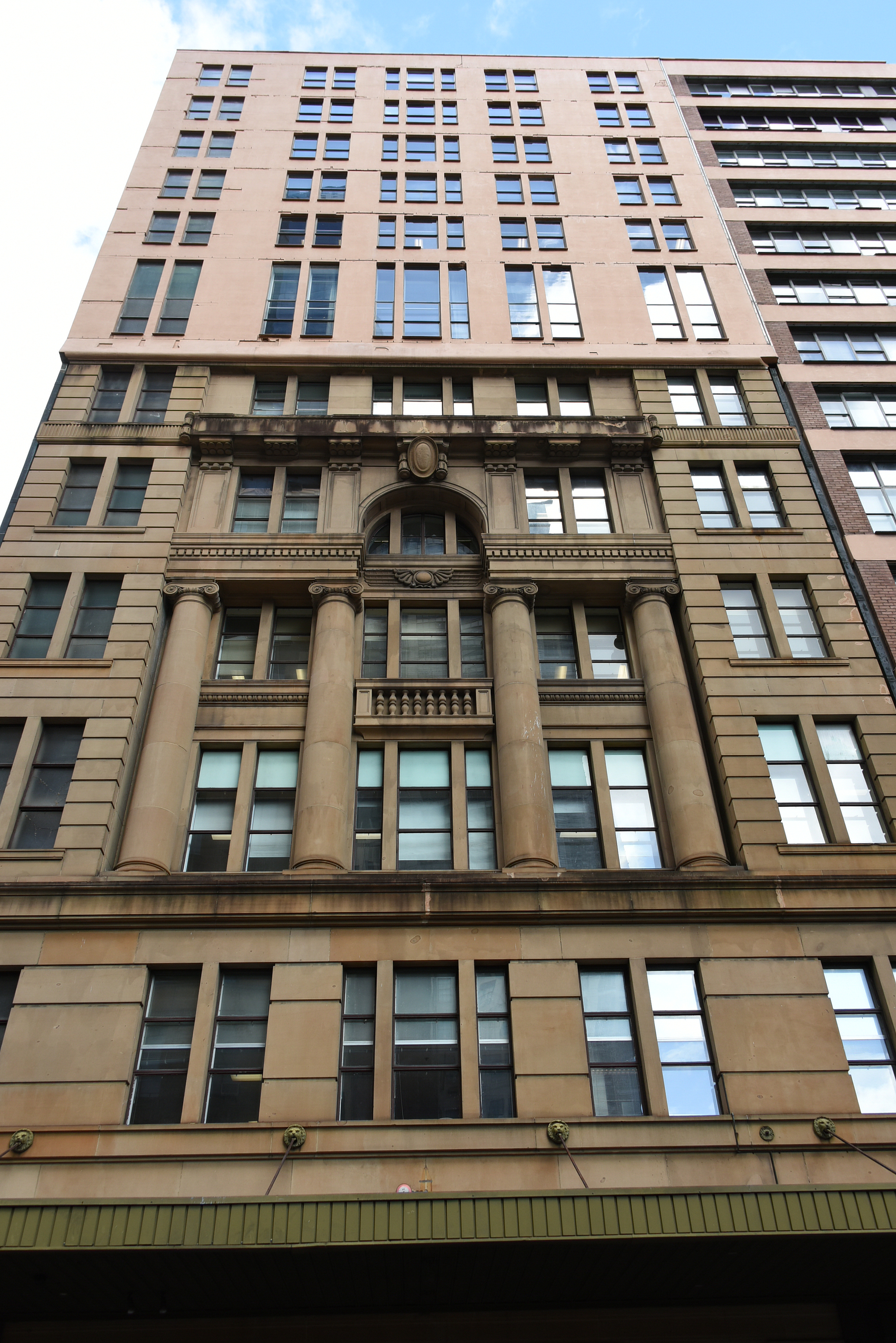
Beaux Arts Style office block, Sydney

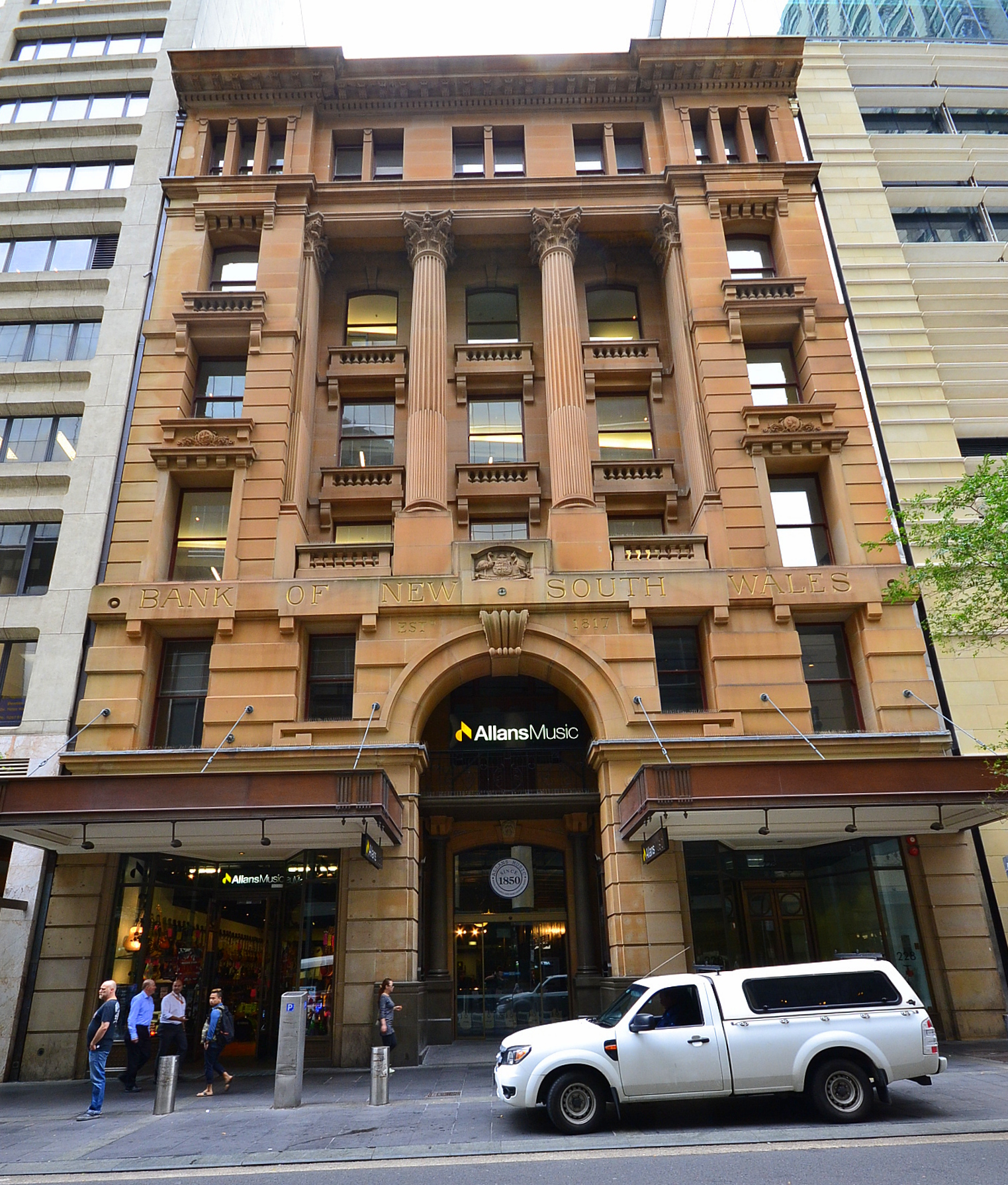
Banking House, Sydney. Completed 1912

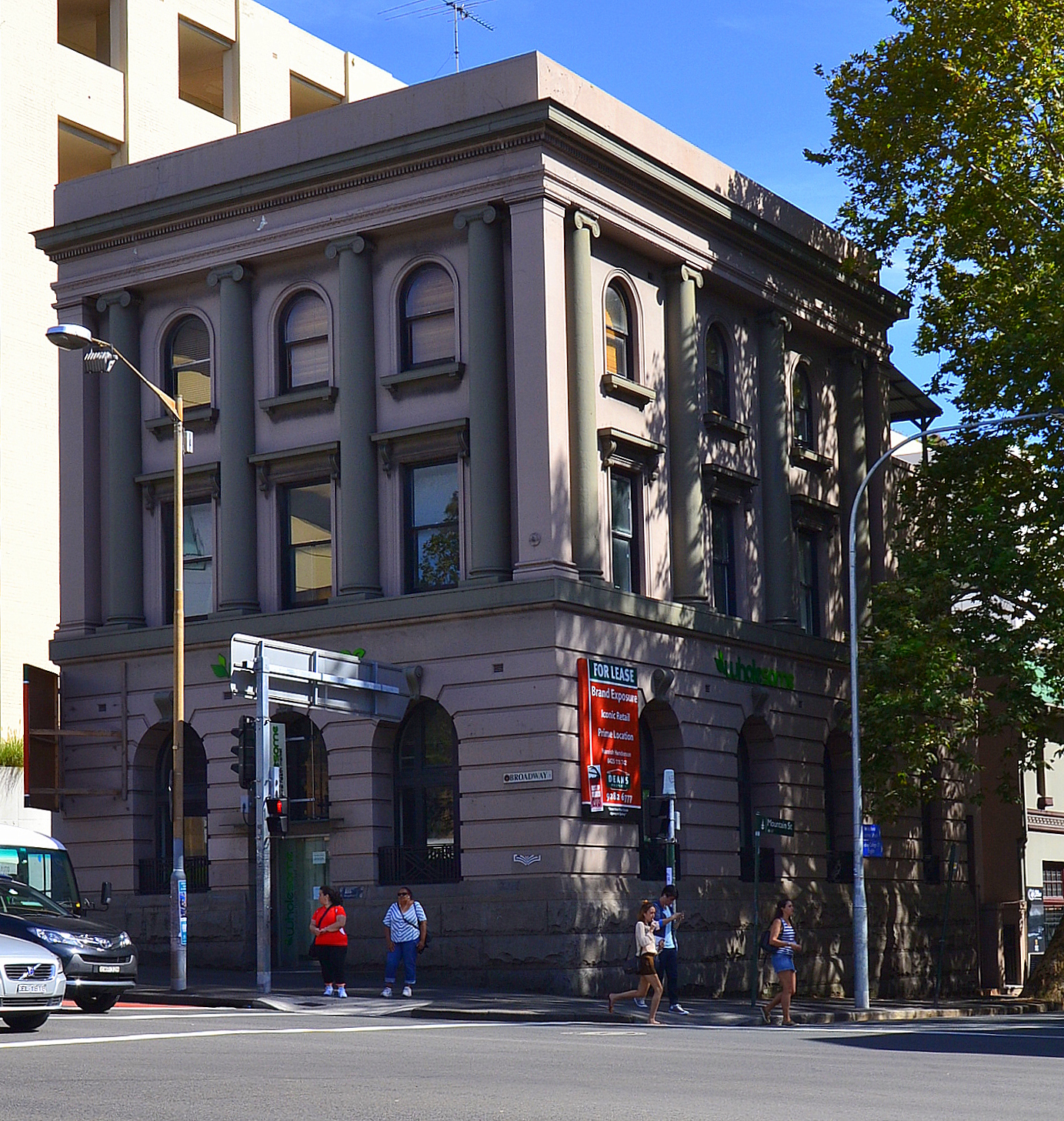
Beaux Arts style commercial building in Broadway, Sydney

=== Inter-war Stripped Classical ===
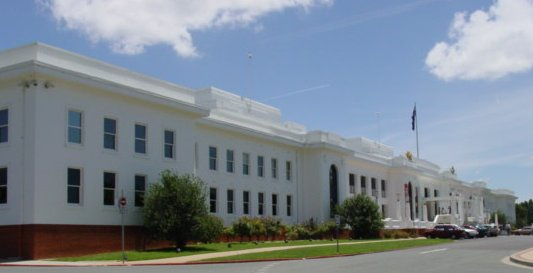
Old Parliament House, Canberra, designed by John Smith Murdoch; opened 1927

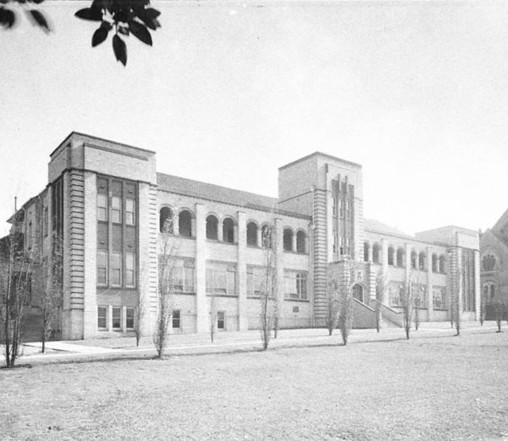
Wyvern House, Newington College; opened 1938

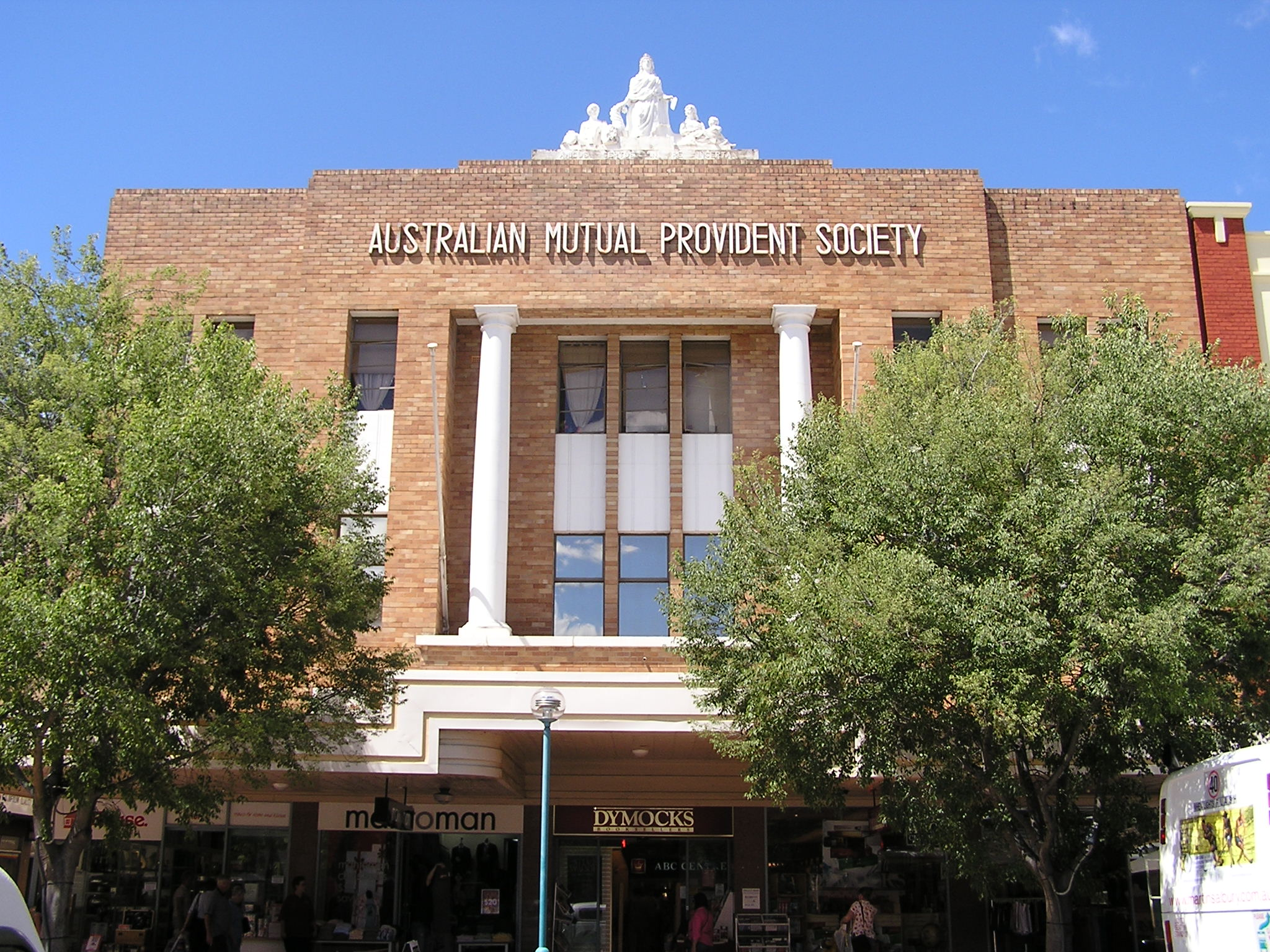
AMP building in Albury

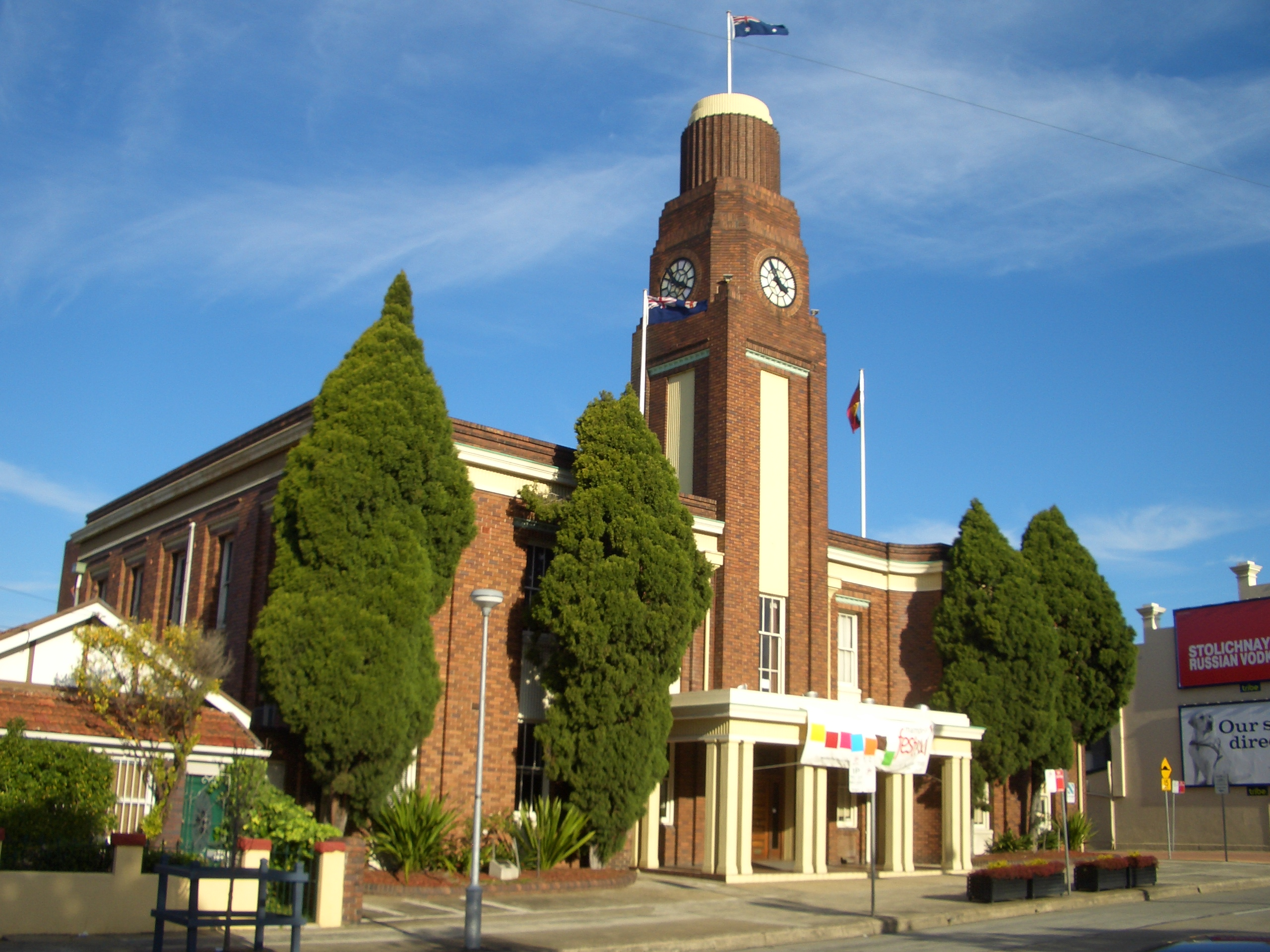
Petersham Town Hall; designed in 1938

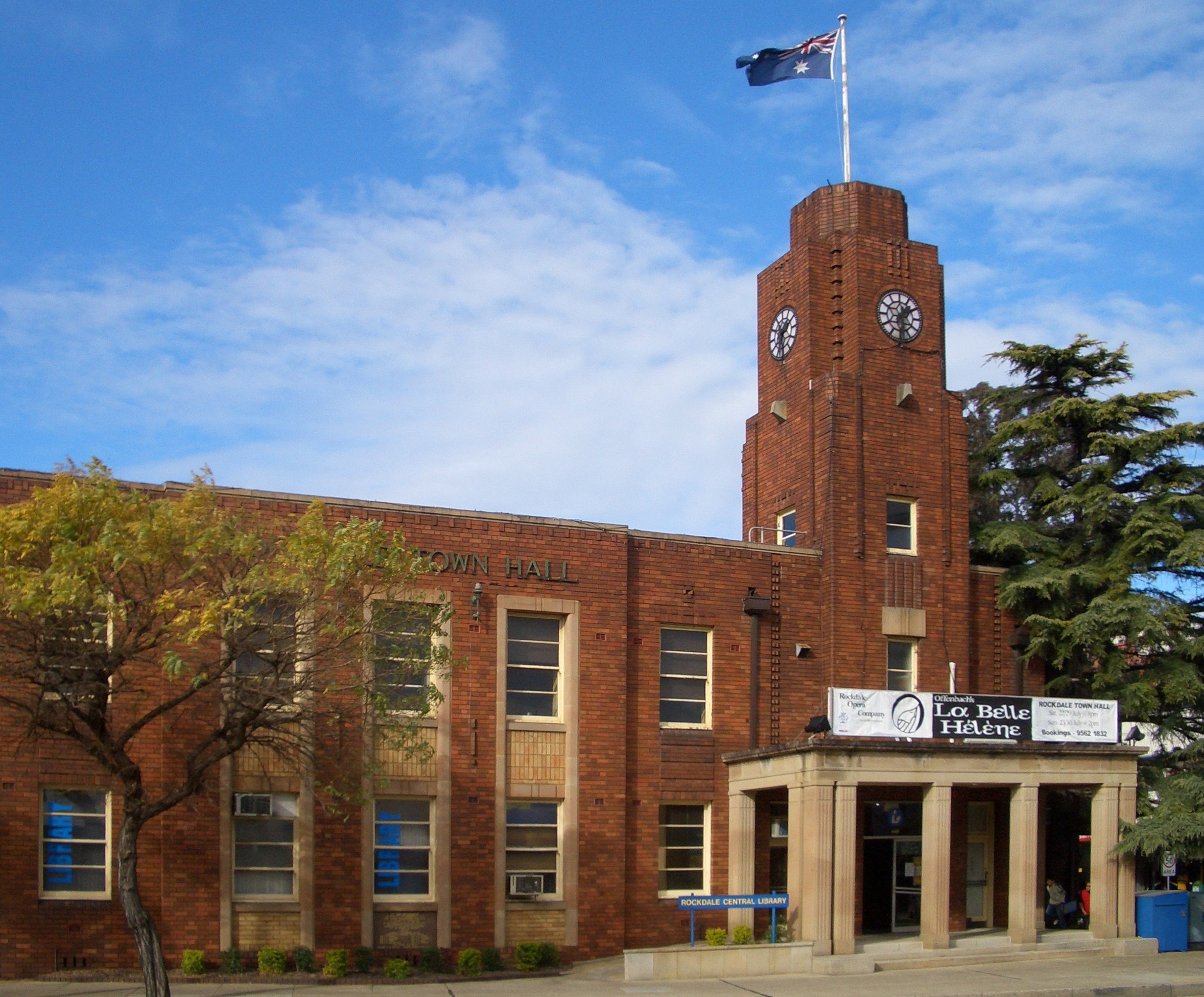
Rockdale Town Hall; designed in 1940

=== Inter-war Commercial Palazzo ===
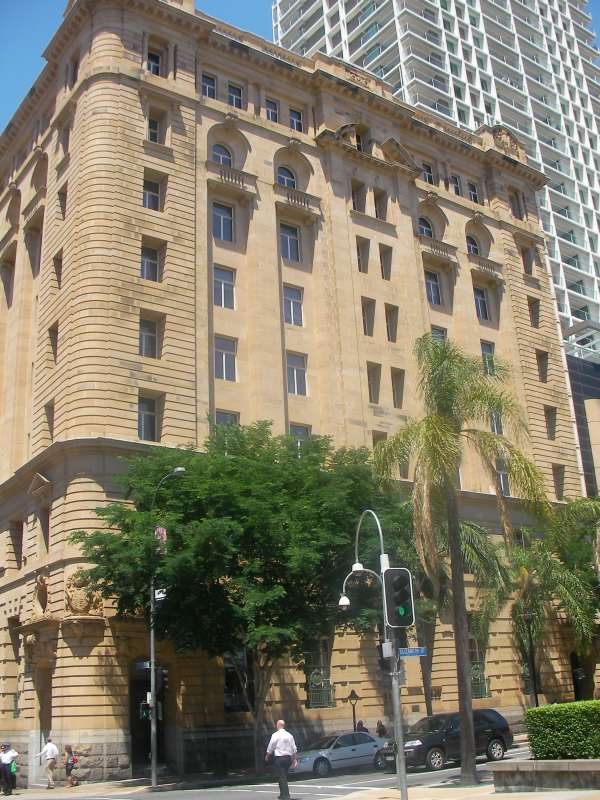
Westpac Bank building. 33 Queen Street, Brisbane; completed 1920

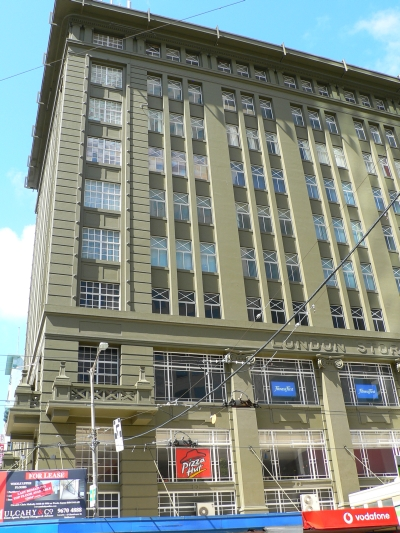
London Stores. Elizabeth Street, Melbourne; completed 1922

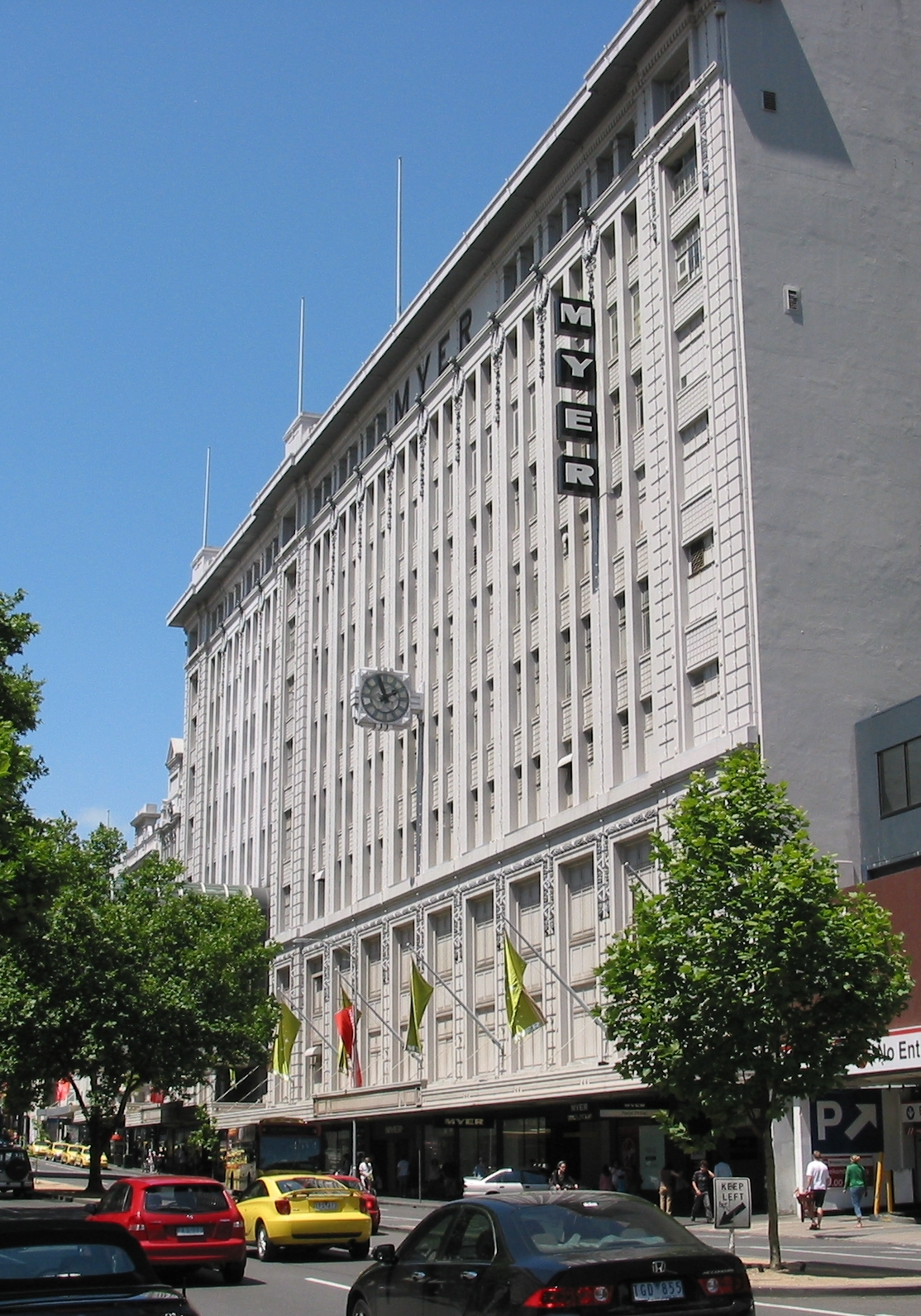
Myer Melbourne main store, Lonsdale Street, Melbourne; completed 1933

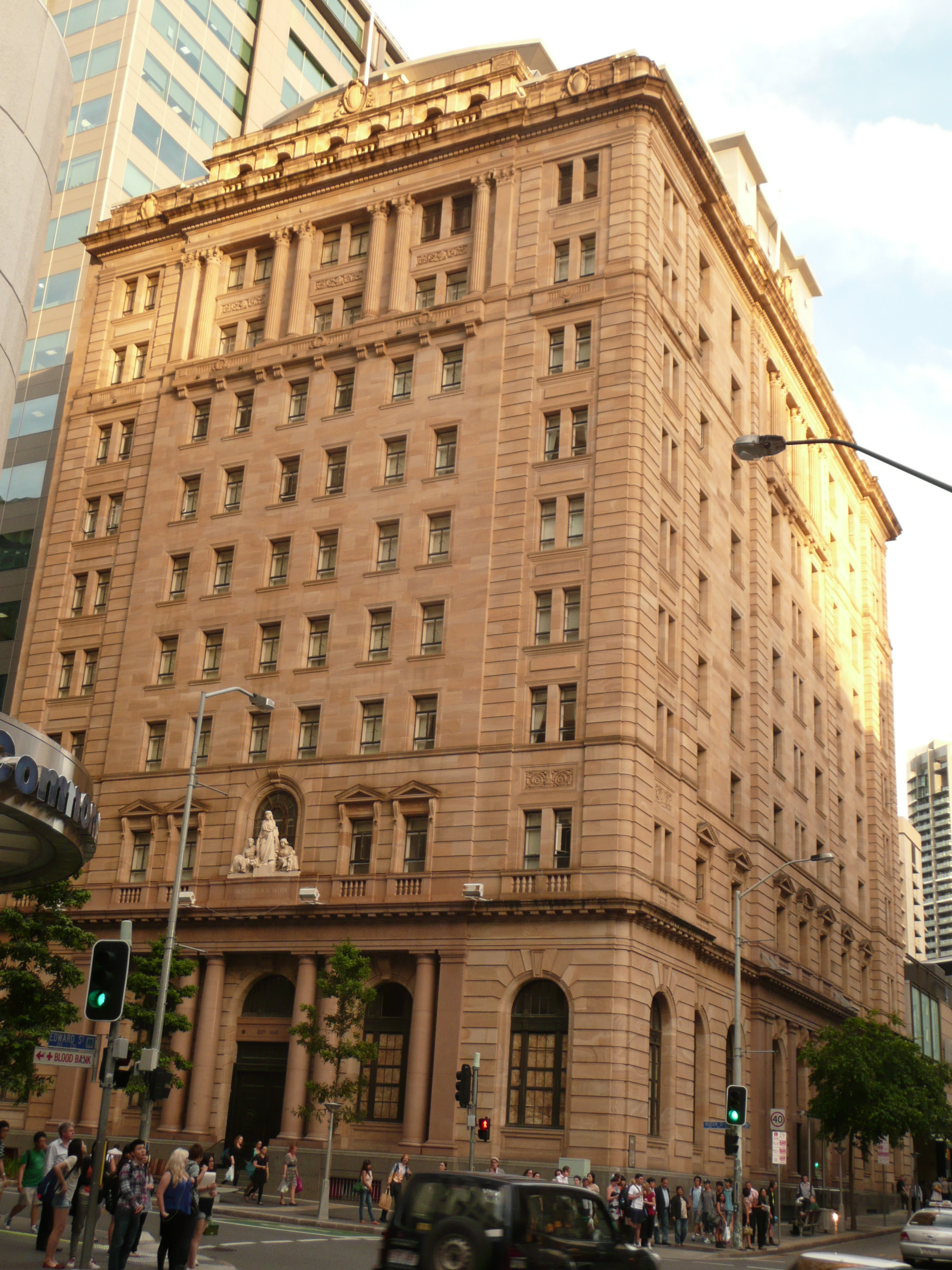
MacArthur Central. cnr Queen and Edward Streets, Brisbane; completed 1934

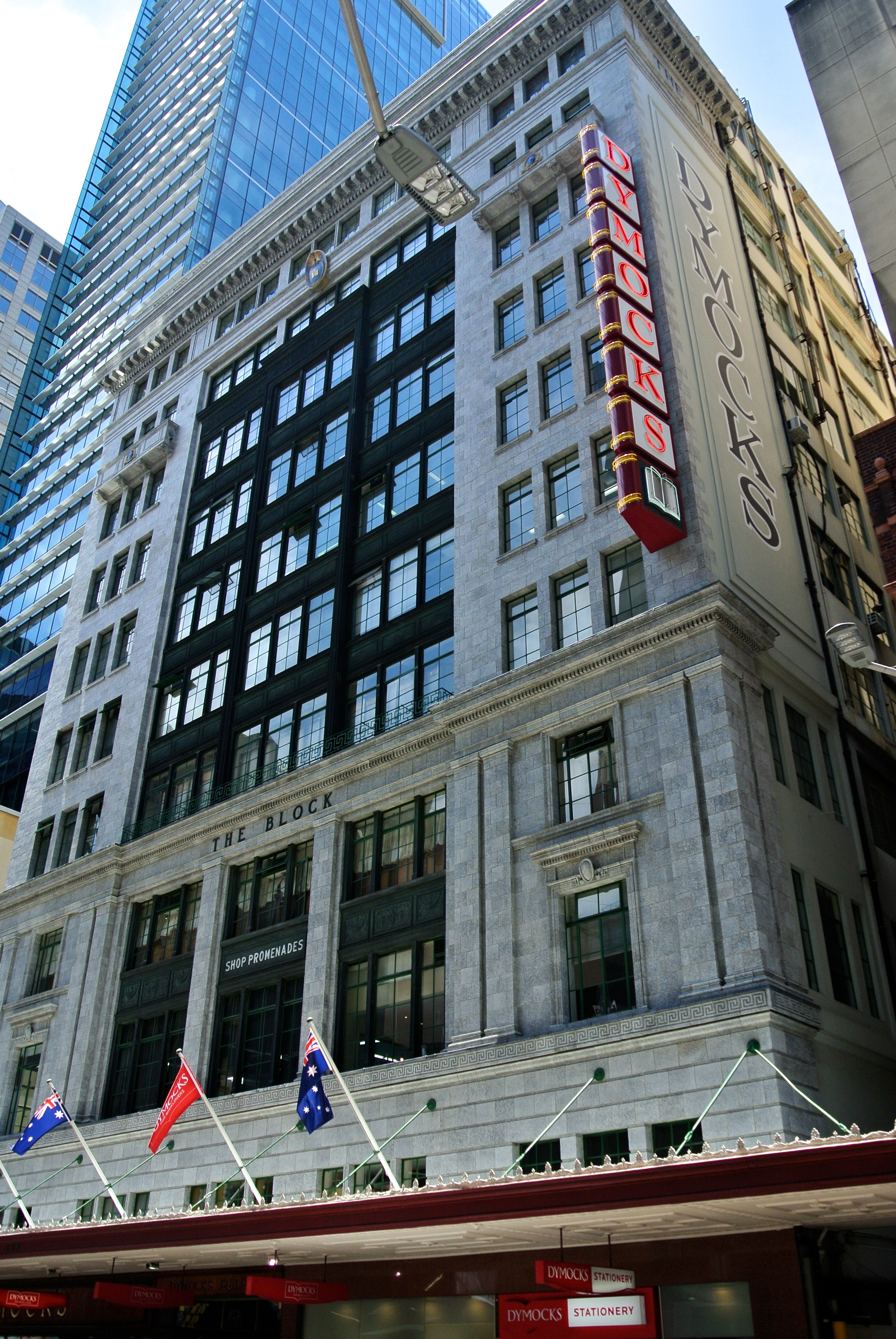
Dymocks Building, George Street, Sydney

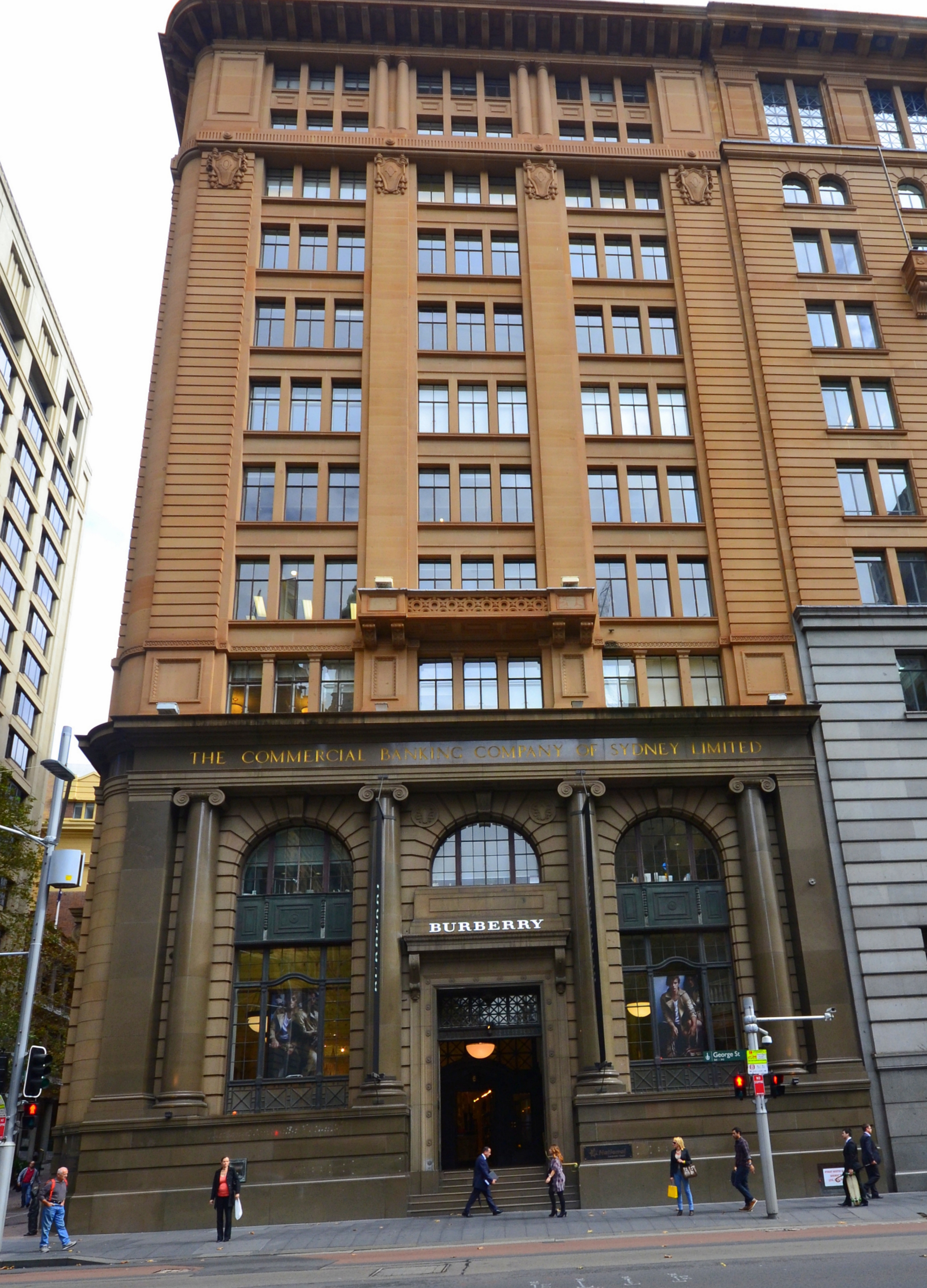
Commercial Banking Company, George Street, Sydney. Completed 1920s

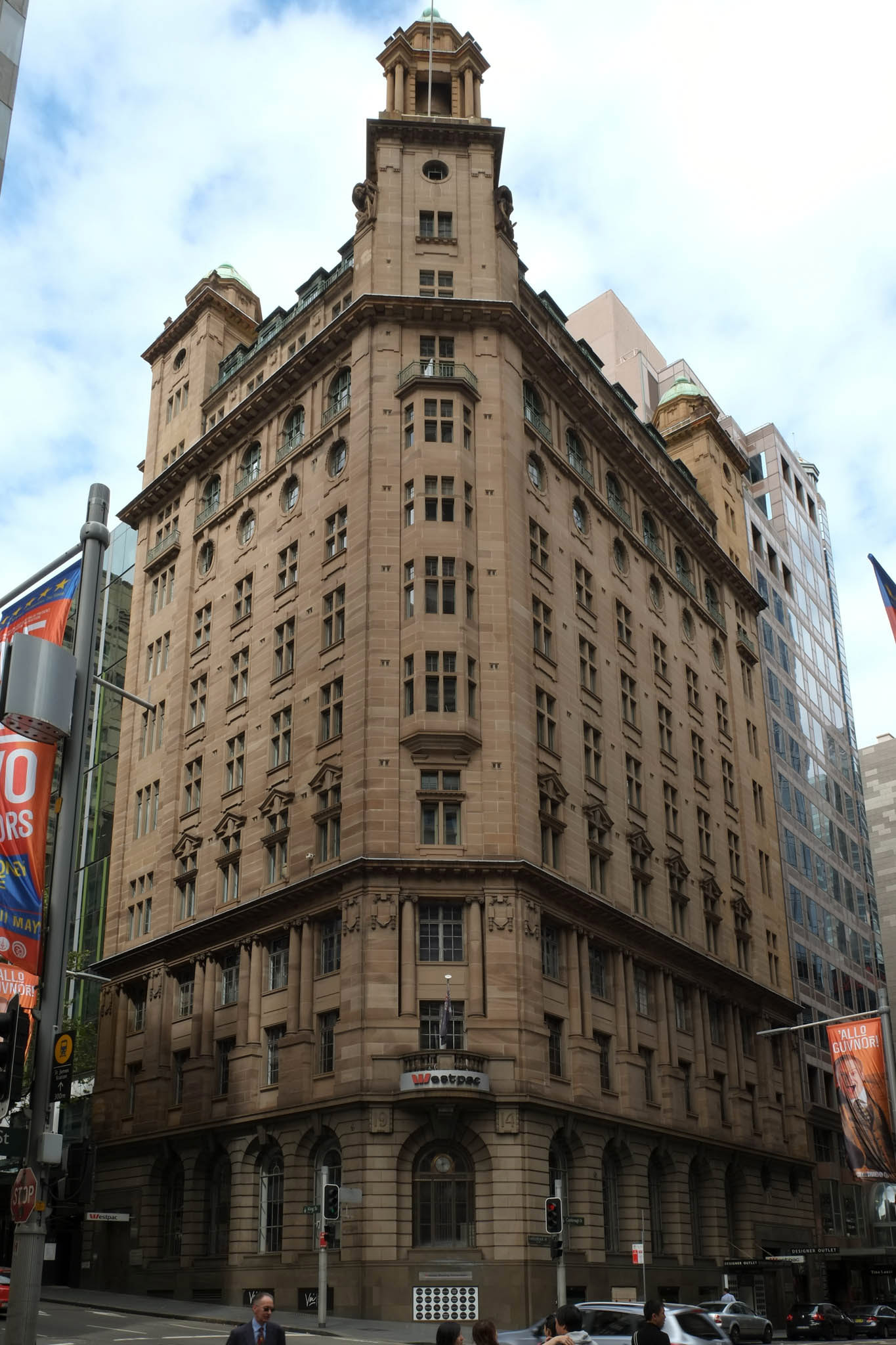
Trust Building; Sydney. Completed 1916

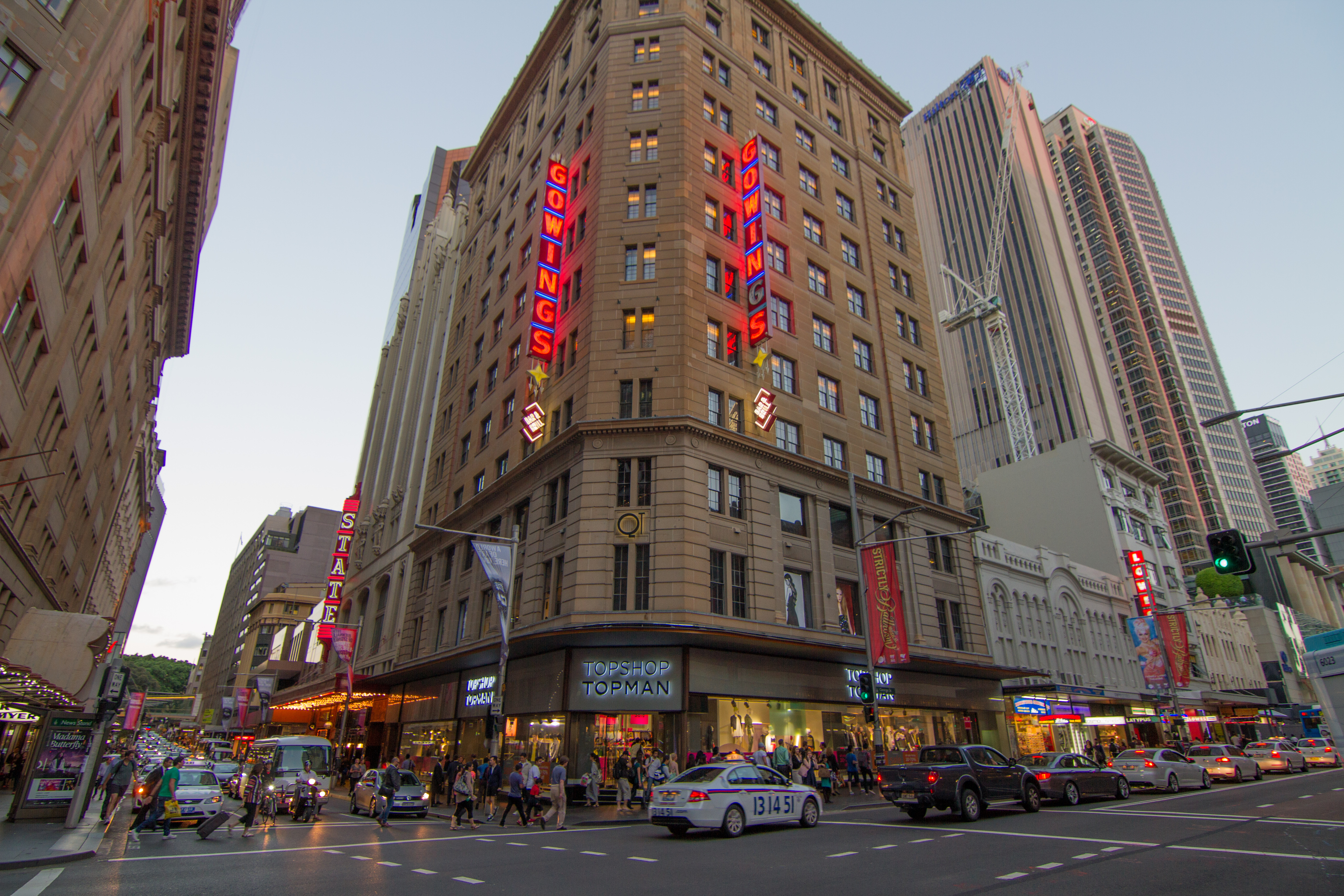
Gowings Building, Sydney. Completed 1929

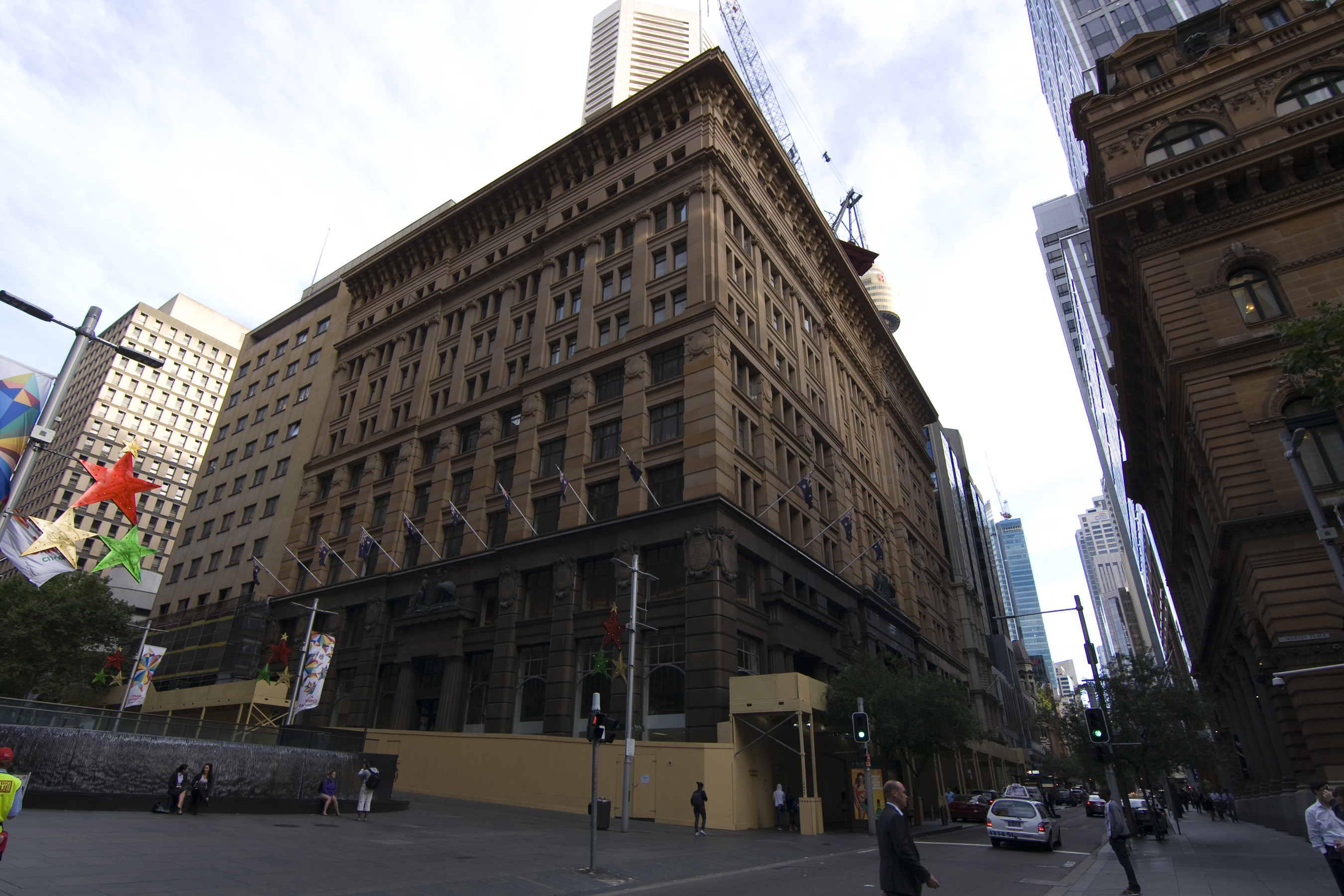
Commonwealth Trading Bank building, Sydney. Completed 1916

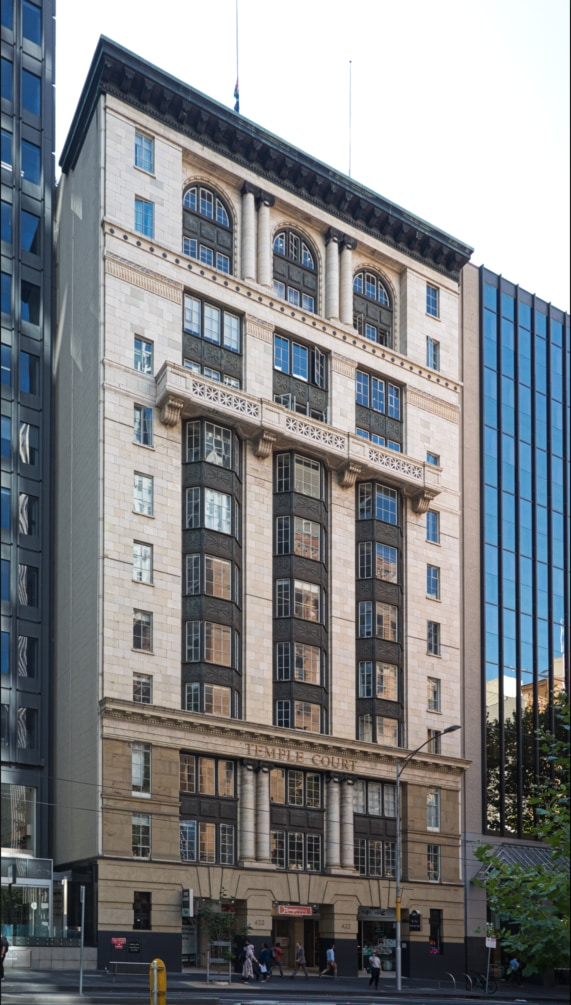
Temple Court Building, Melbourne

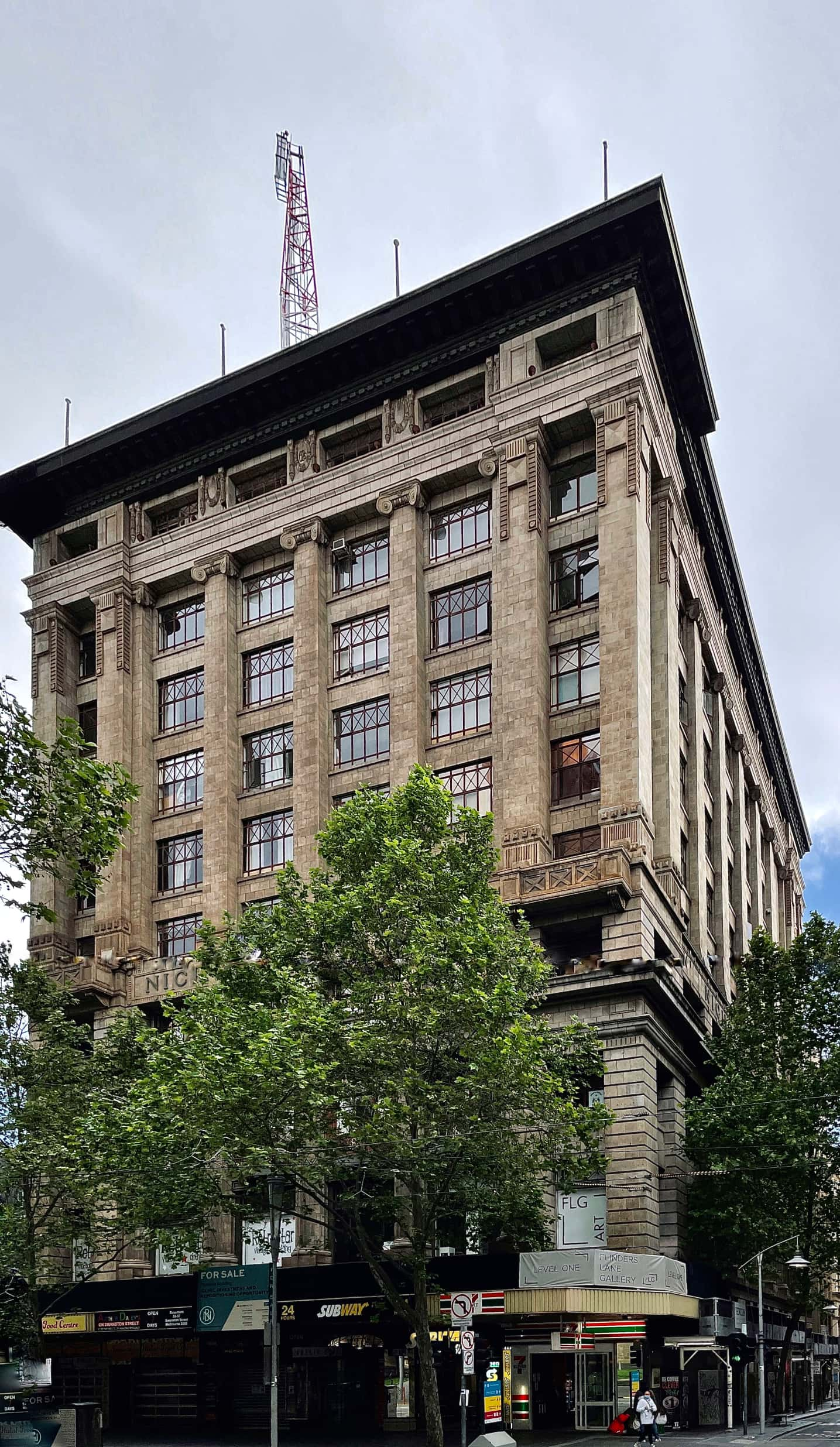
Nicholas Building. Swanston Street, Melbourne; completed 1925

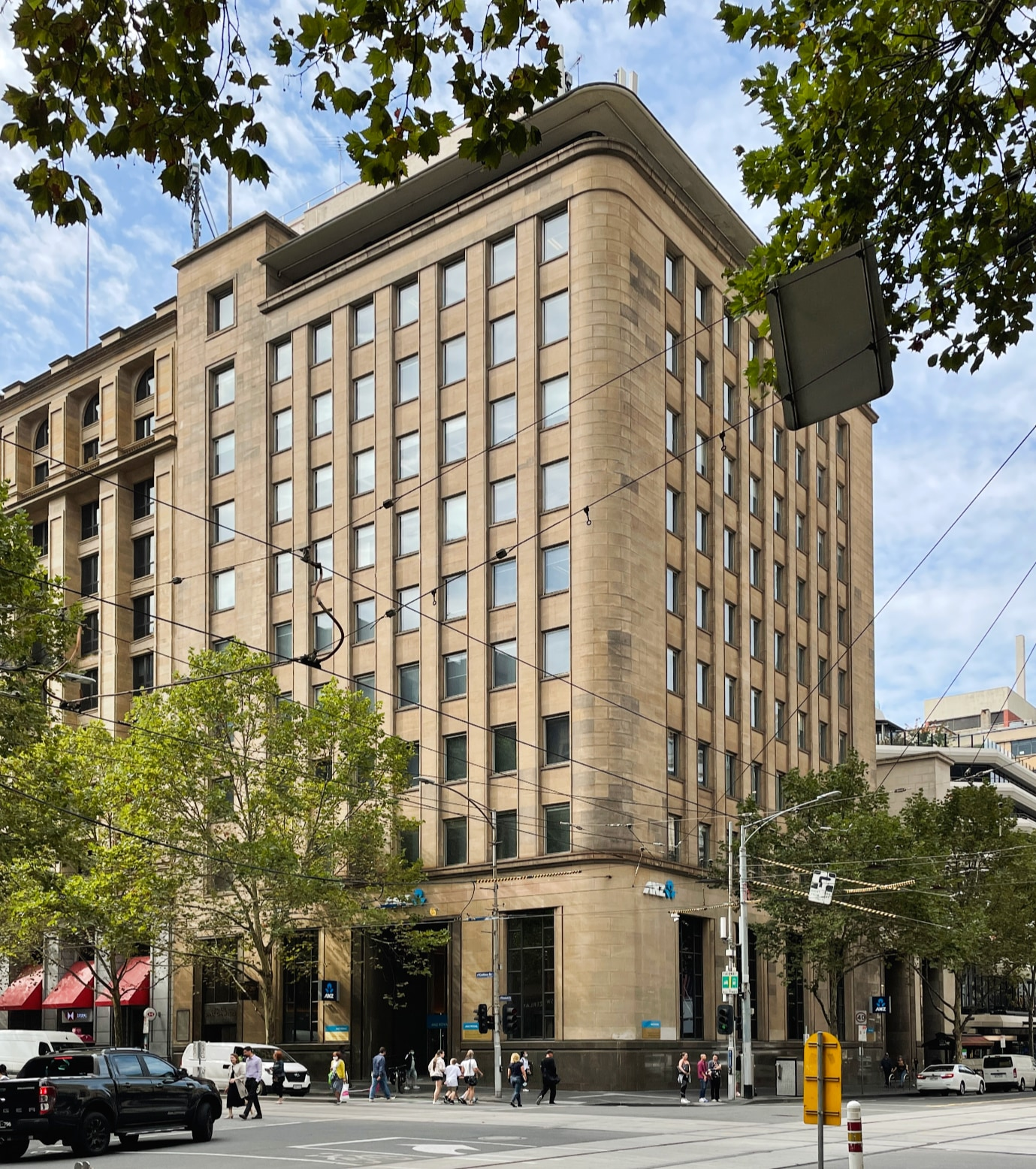
Former AMP Building. Collins Street, Melbourne; completed 1927

=== Inter-war Mediterranean ===
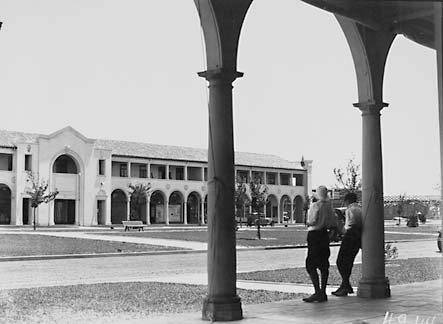
Sydney and Melbourne buildings, City Centre, Australian Capital Territory; commenced building 1920s

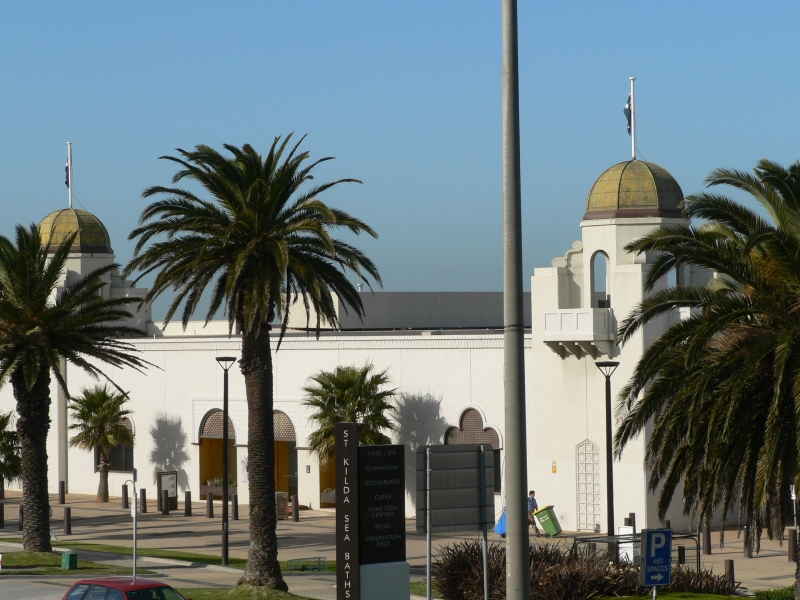
St Kilda Sea Baths. St Kilda

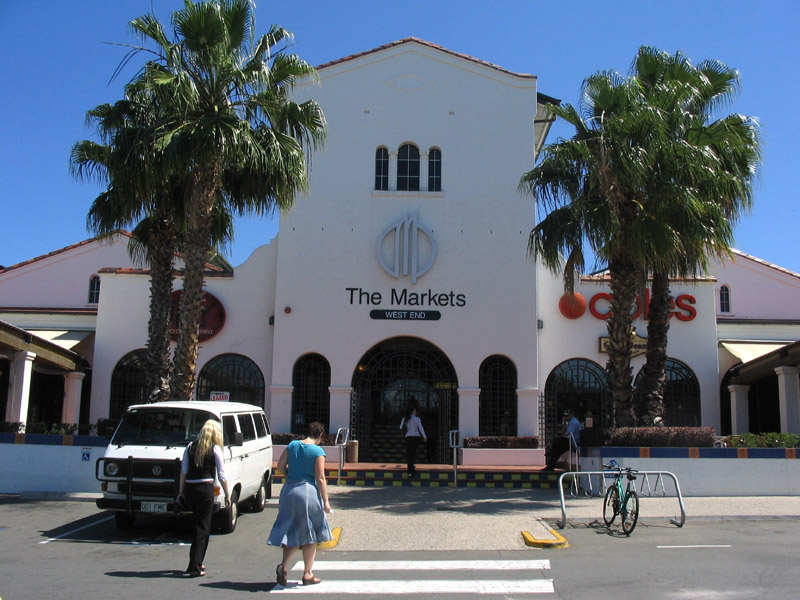
Markets, West End

=== Inter-War Spanish Mission ===
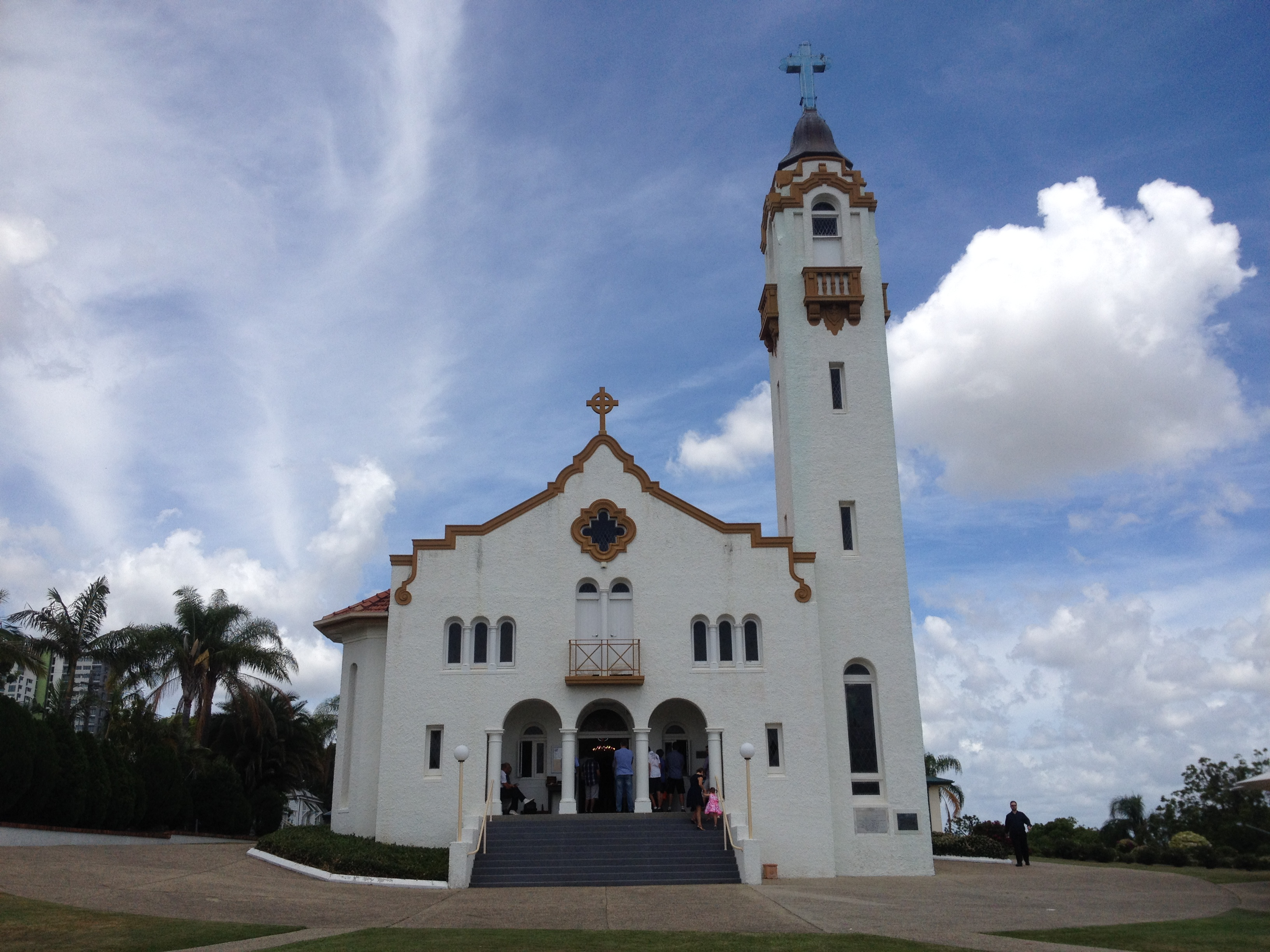
Our Lady of Victories Church, Bowen Hills. Built 1924–25; architects likely to be Thomas Ramsay Hall and George Gray Prentice.

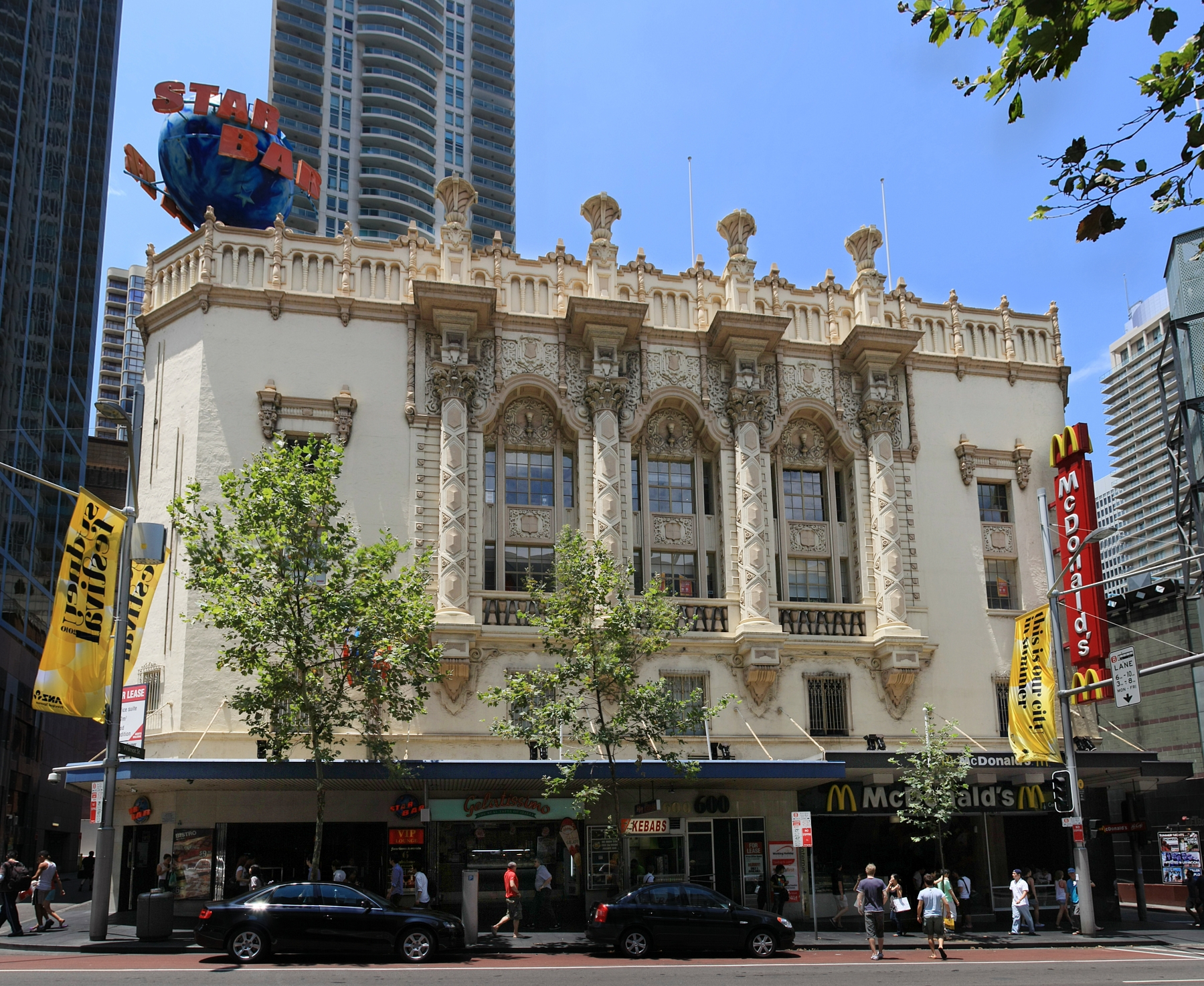
Plaza Theatre, Sydney. Built 1929–30; architect, Eric Heath.

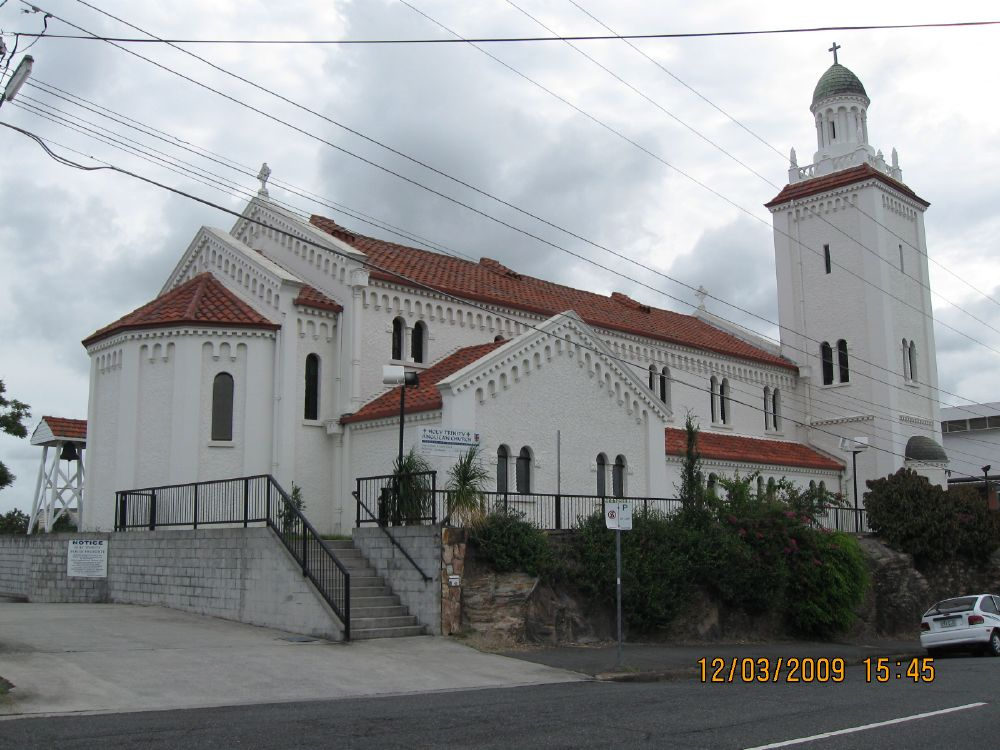
Holy Trinity Anglican Church, Woolloongabba. Completed 1930; architect, Eric Ford.

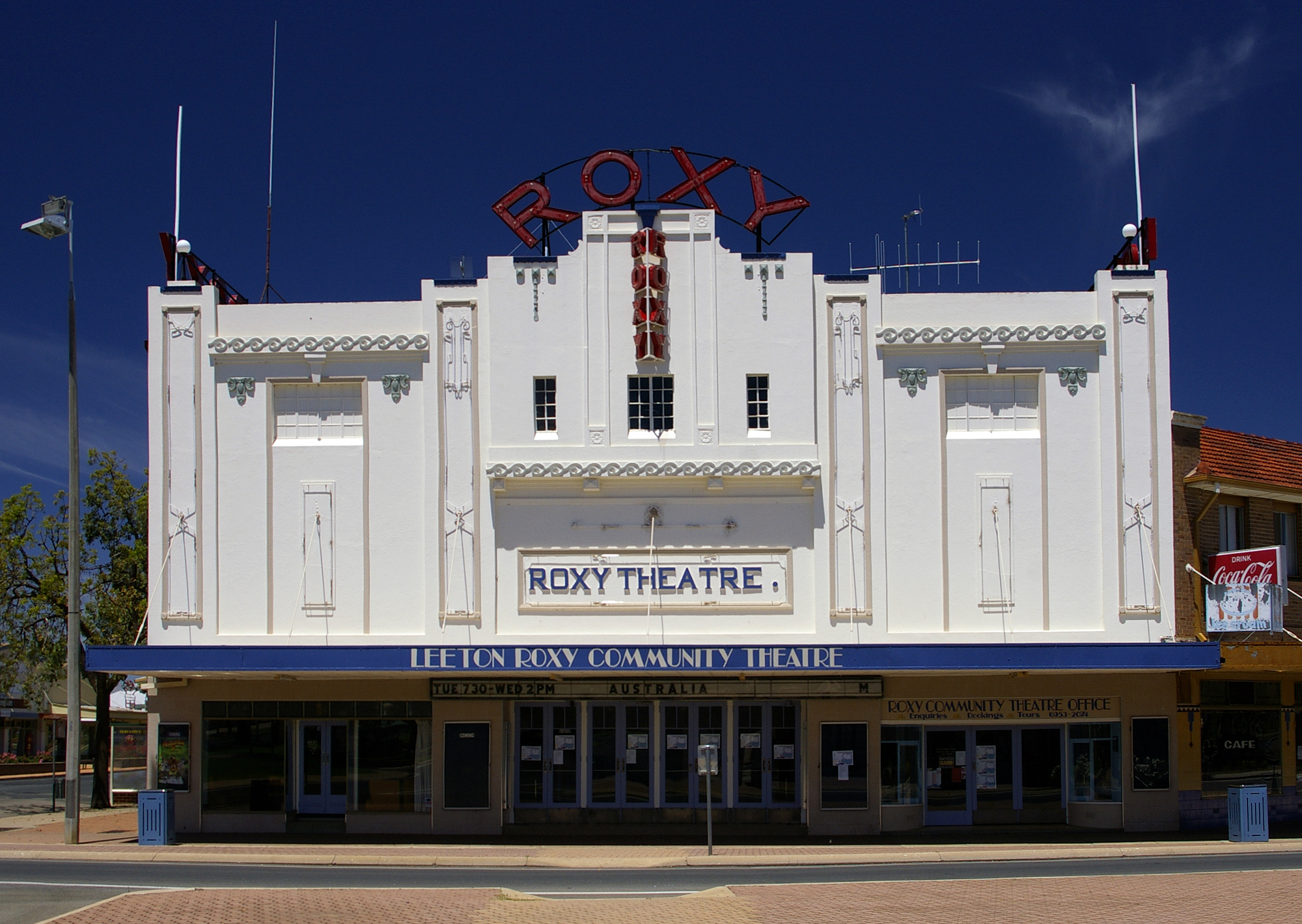
Roxy Community Theatre, Leeton. Built 1929–30; architects, Kaberry & Chard.

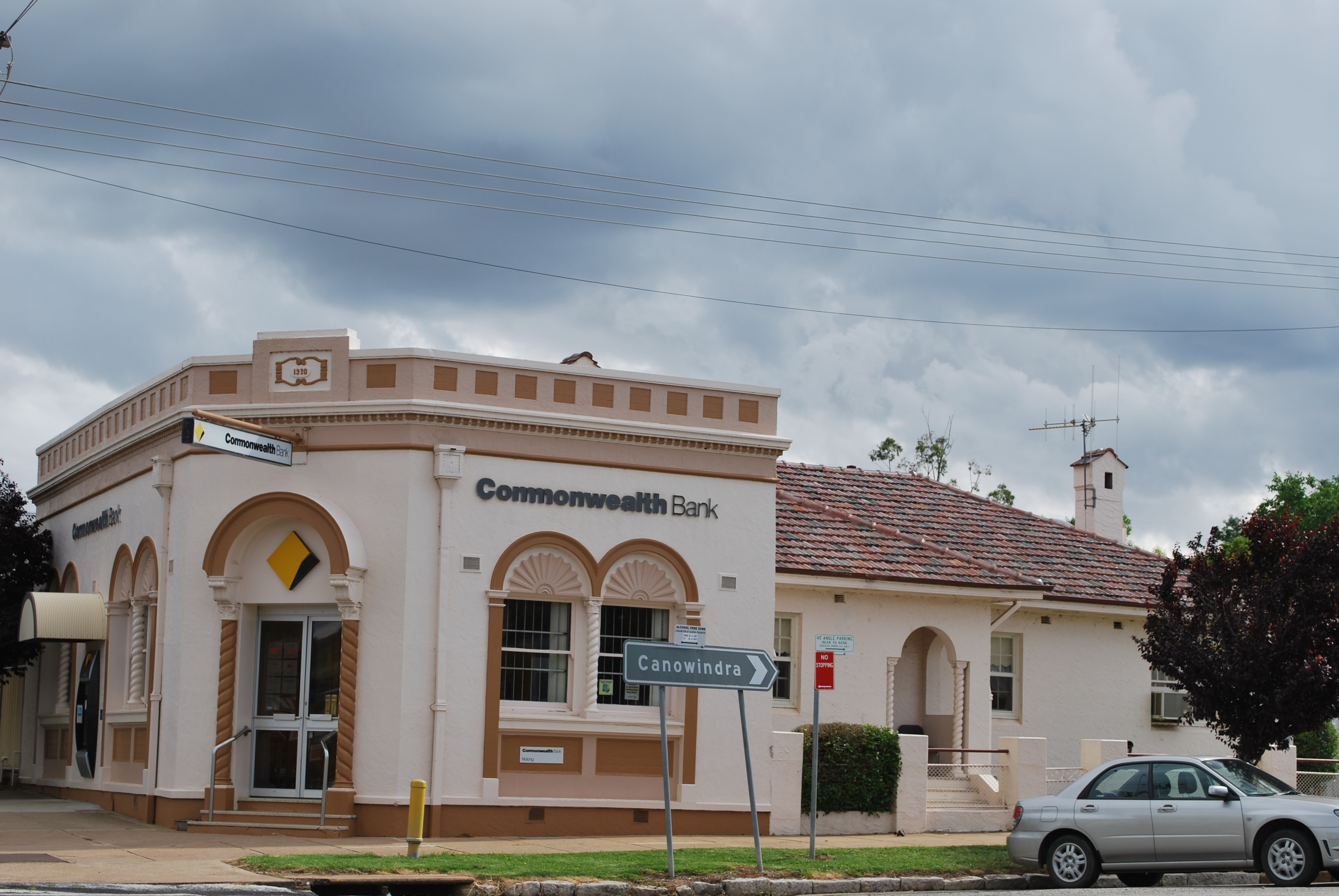
Commonwealth Bank, Molong: built 1930.

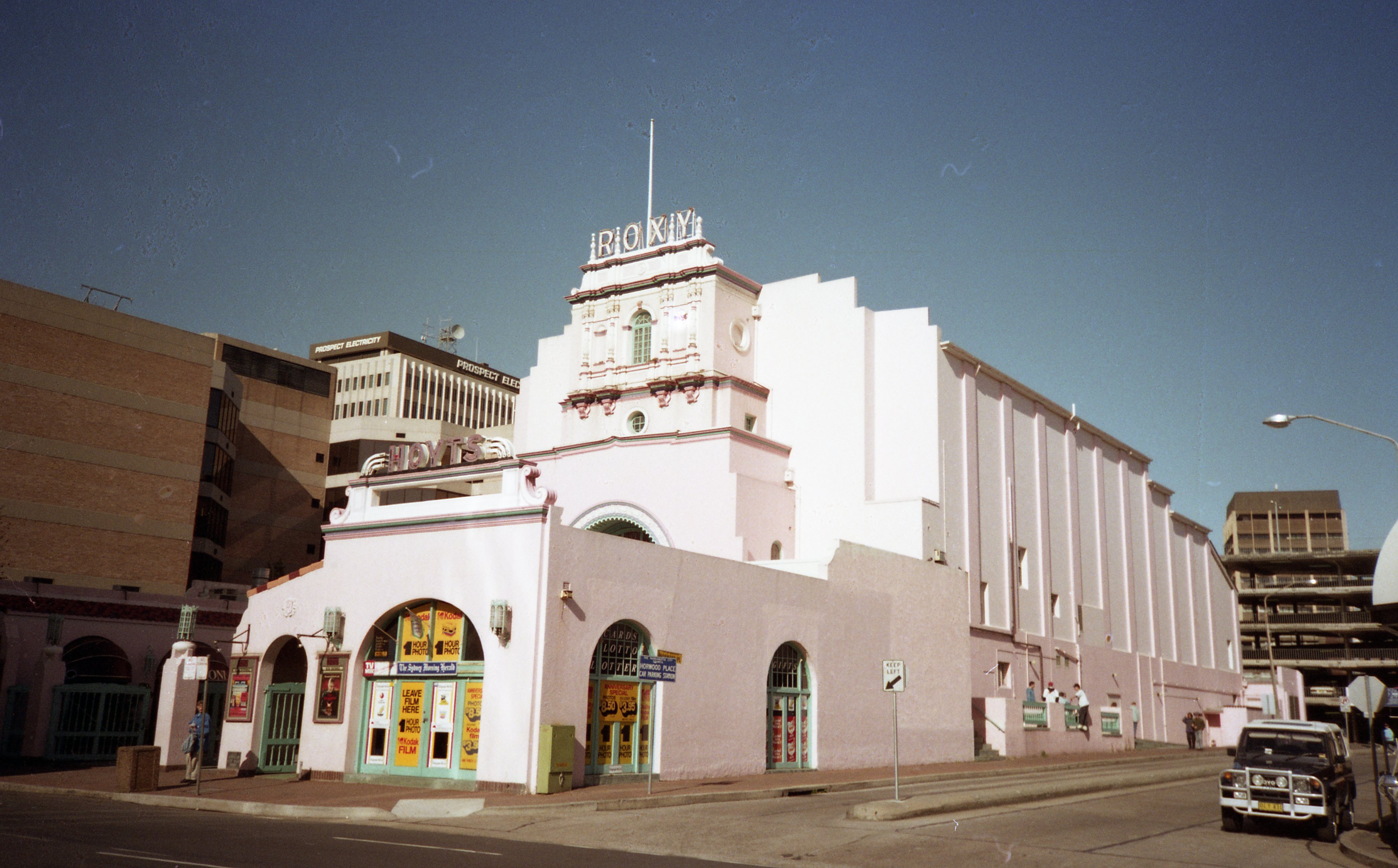
Roxy Theatre, Parramatta. Completed 1930; architects L. F. Herbert and E. D. Wilson.

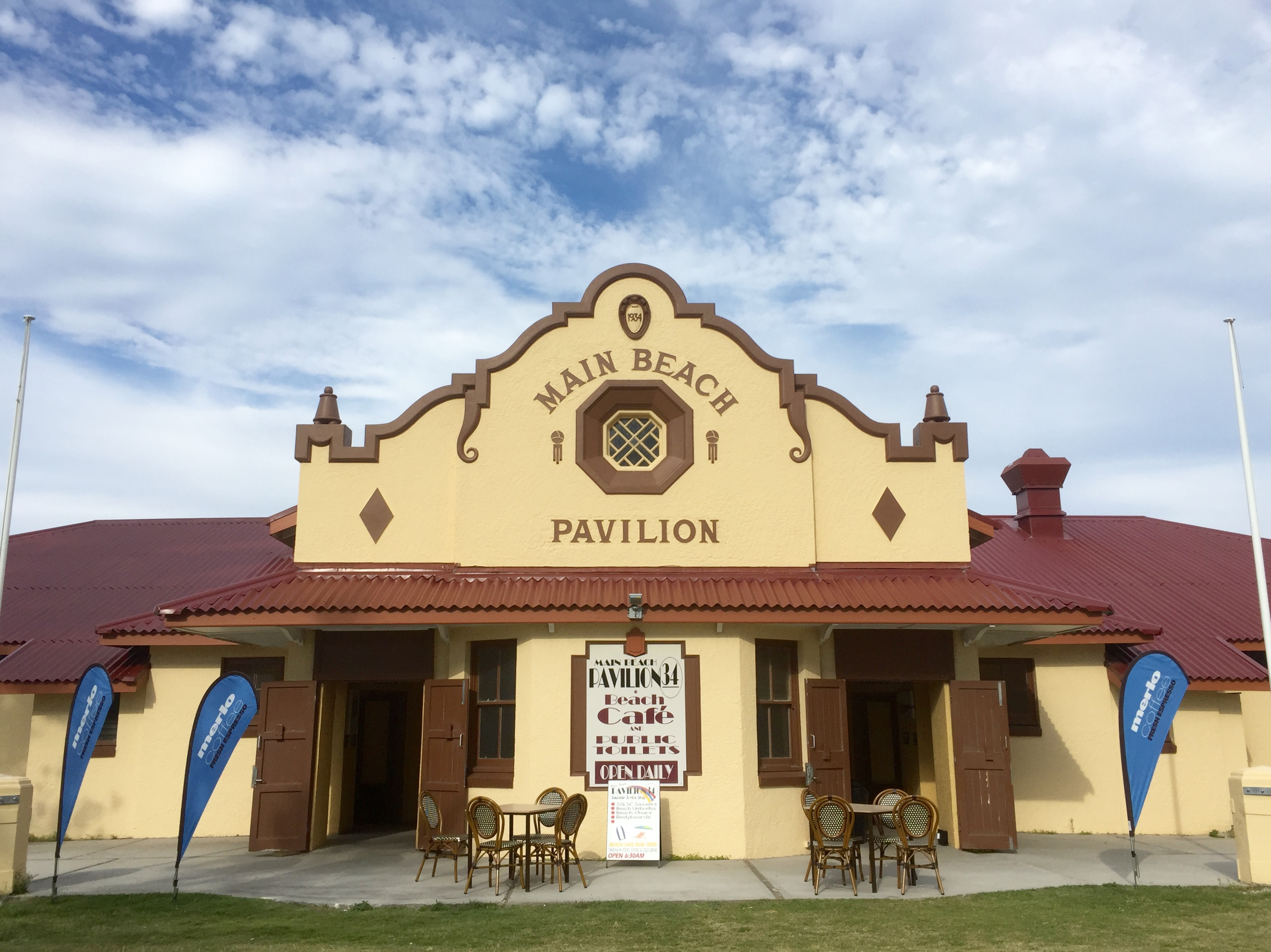
Main Beach Pavilion, Southport; built 1934; Hall & Phillips, architects.

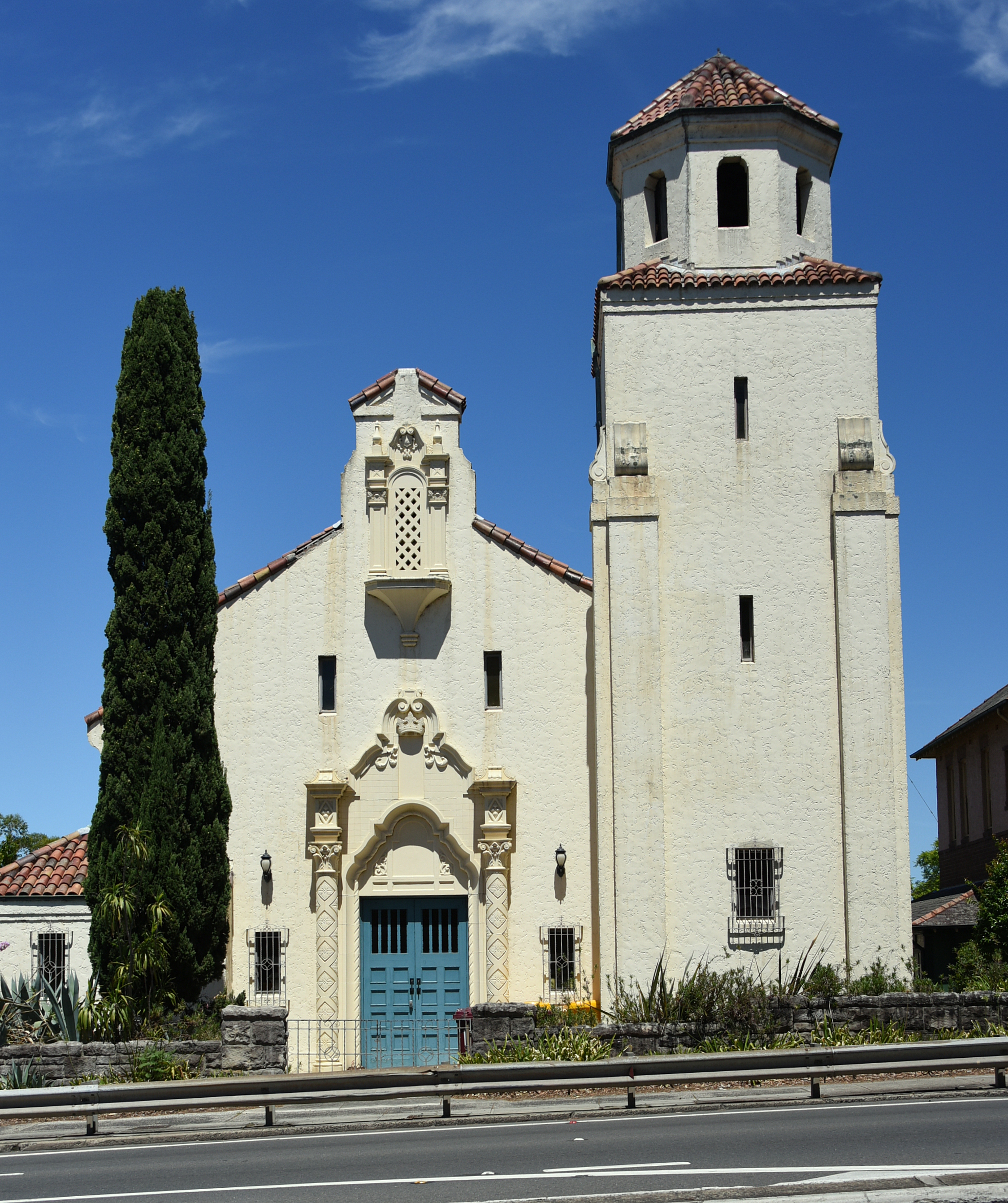
Sacred Heart Catholic Church, Pymble. Built 1934. Now Ku-ring-gai Town Hall.

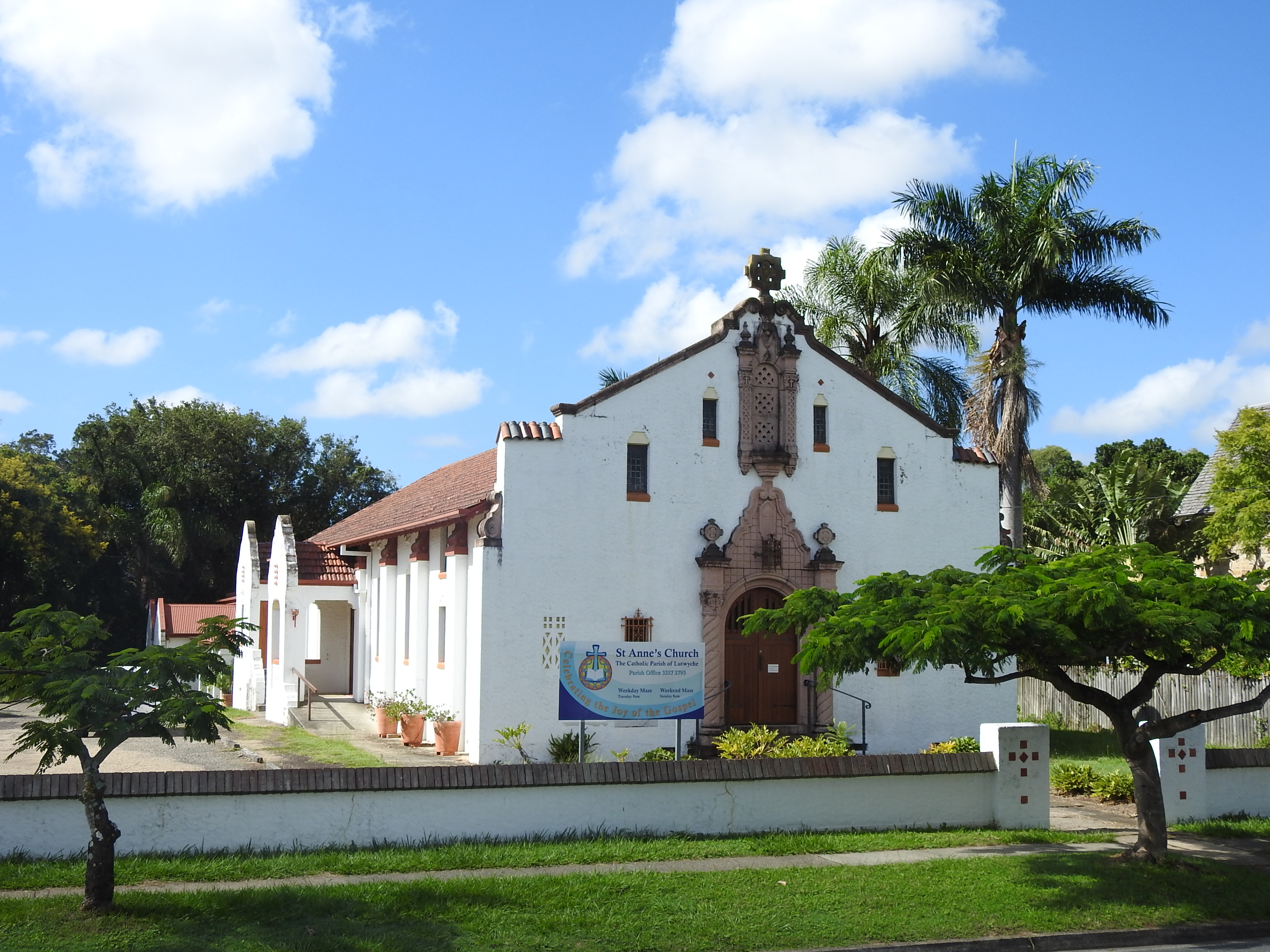
St Anne's Catholic Church, Kalinga. Built 1934–35; architects, Hennessey and Hennessey.

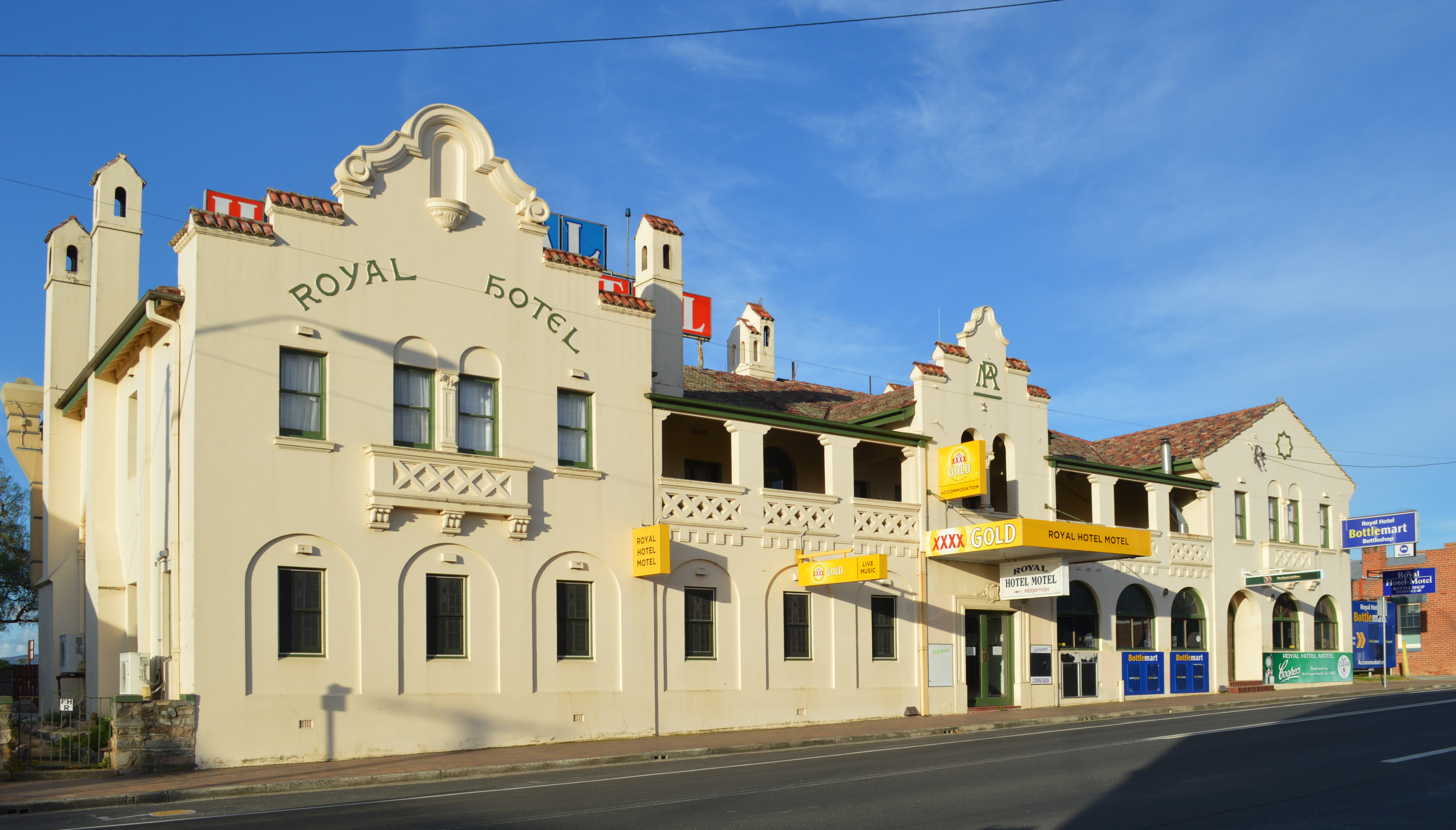
Royal Hotel, Tenterfield. 1935 remodel by J P Donoghue, architect.

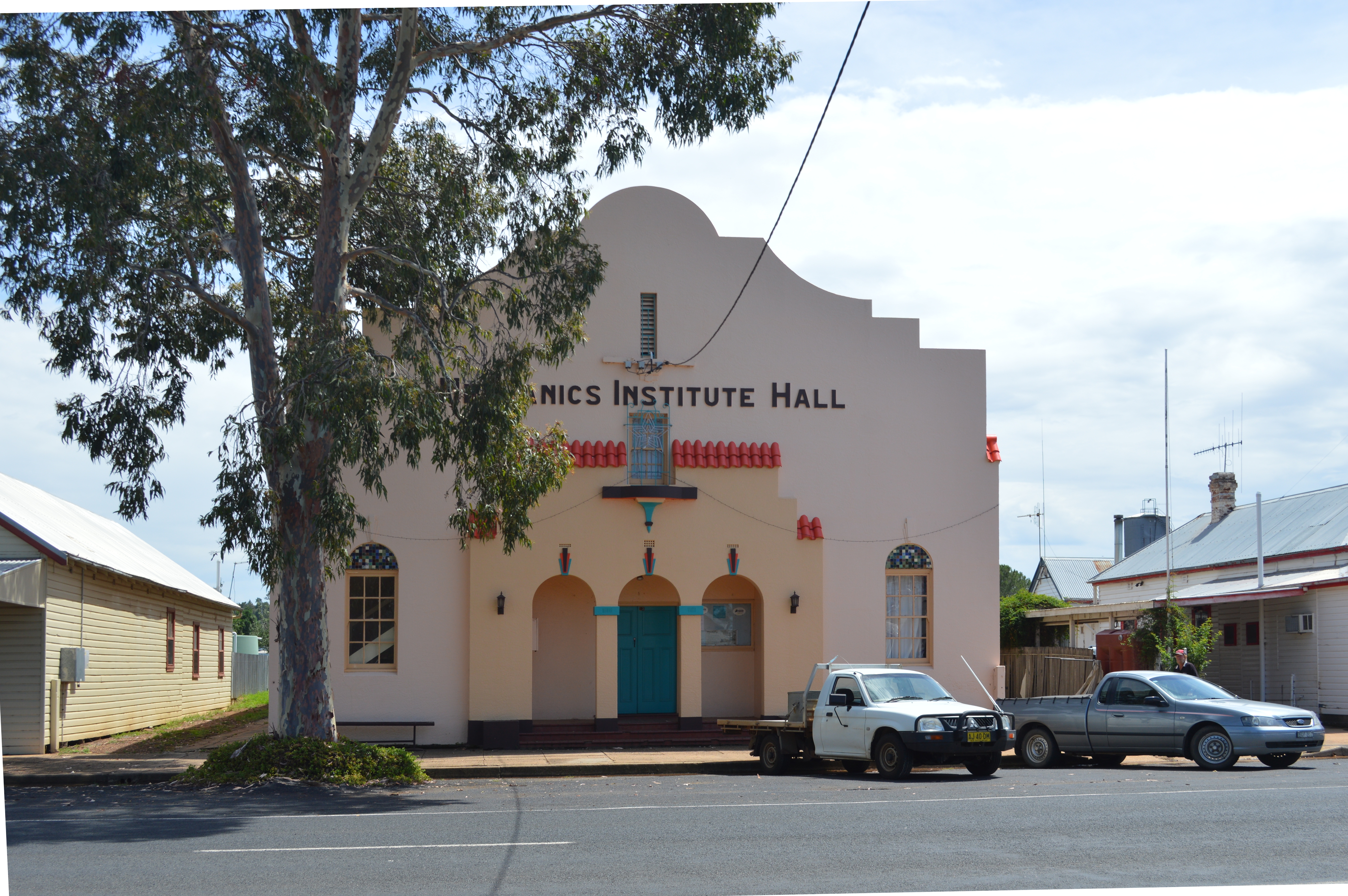
Mechanics Institute Hall, Mendooran. Completed 1935. Designed by Walter Innes-Kerr.

=== Inter-war Art Deco ===
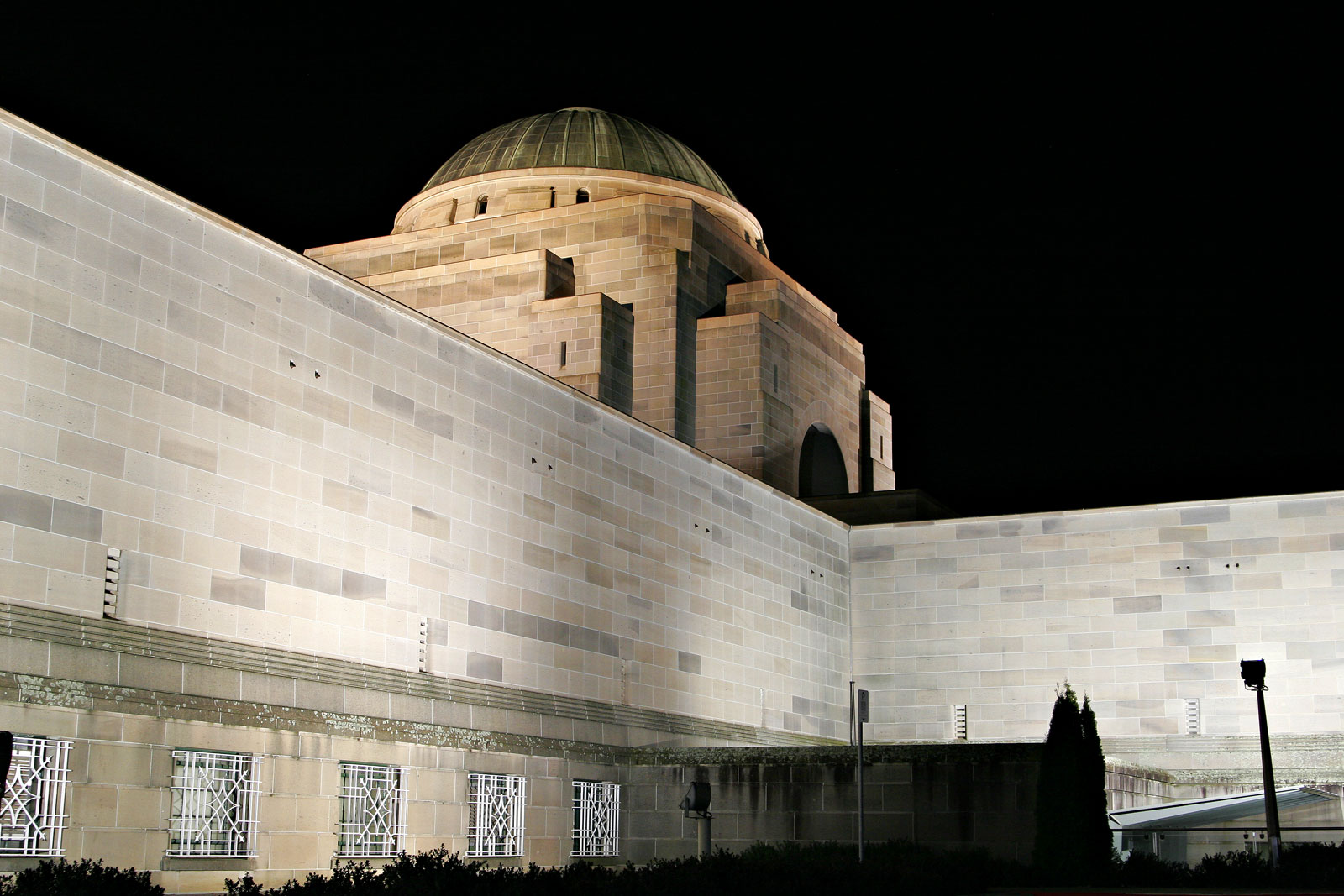
Australian War Memorial; building completed 1941; Byzantine architecture style with strong styling elements of art deco throughout

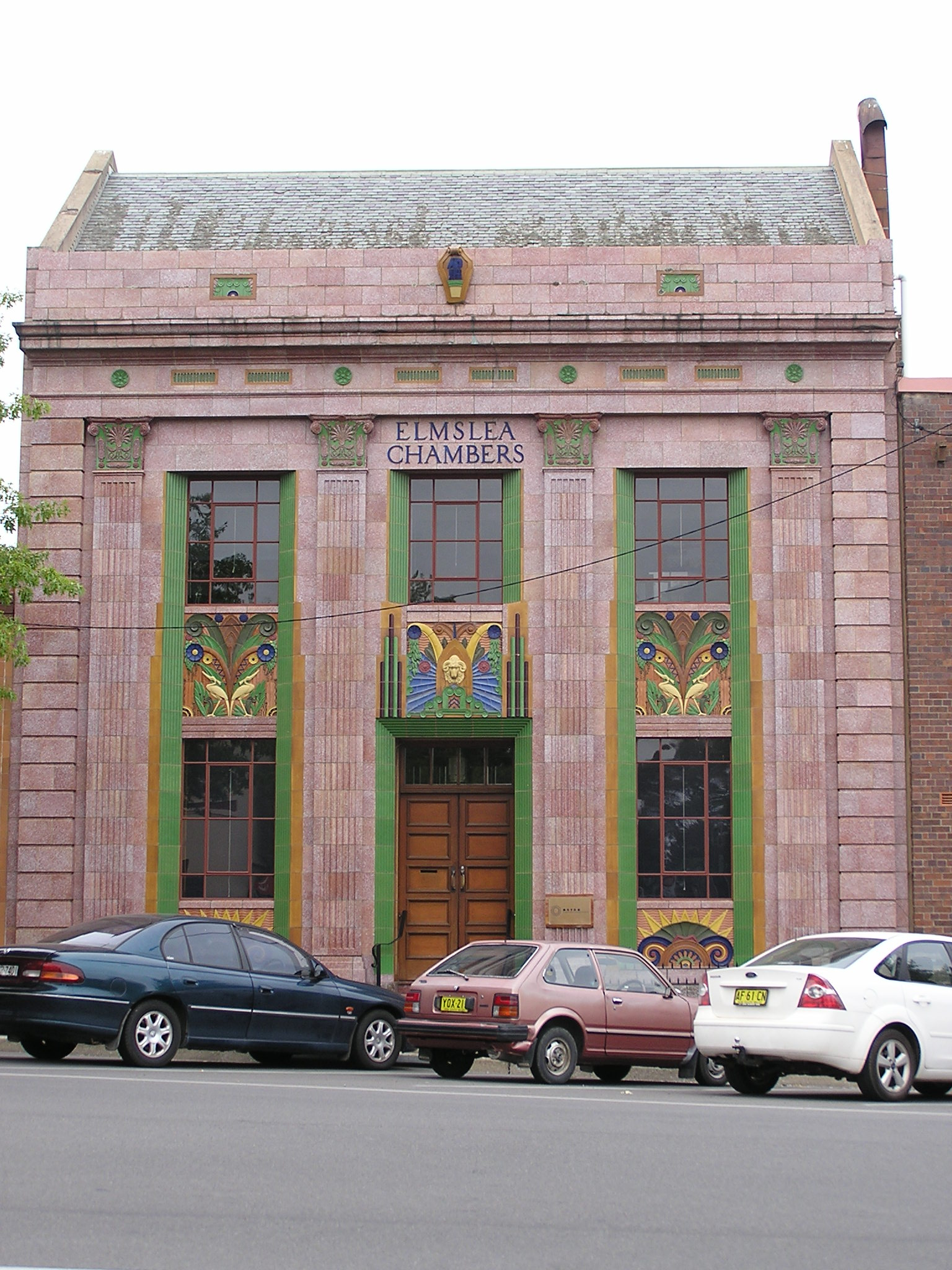
Elmslea Chambers, Goulburn; built 1933; it was one of the first buildings in Australia to use Glazed architectural terra-cotta in its façade

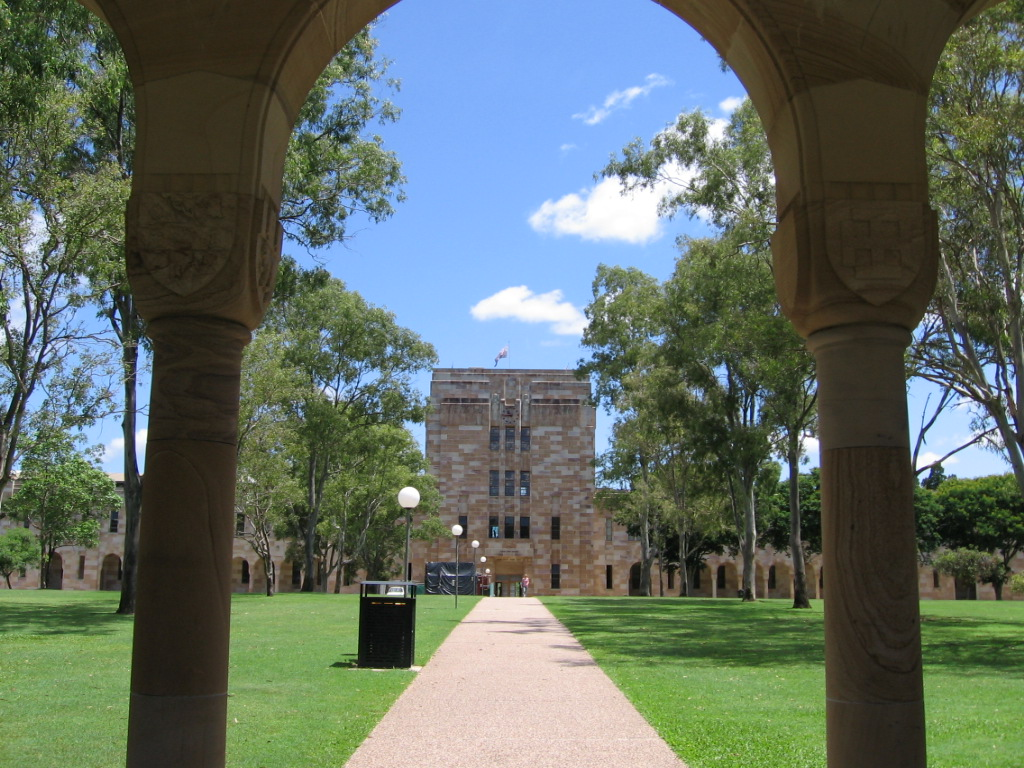
Forgan Smith Buildings and Great Court, University of Queensland; completed 1927

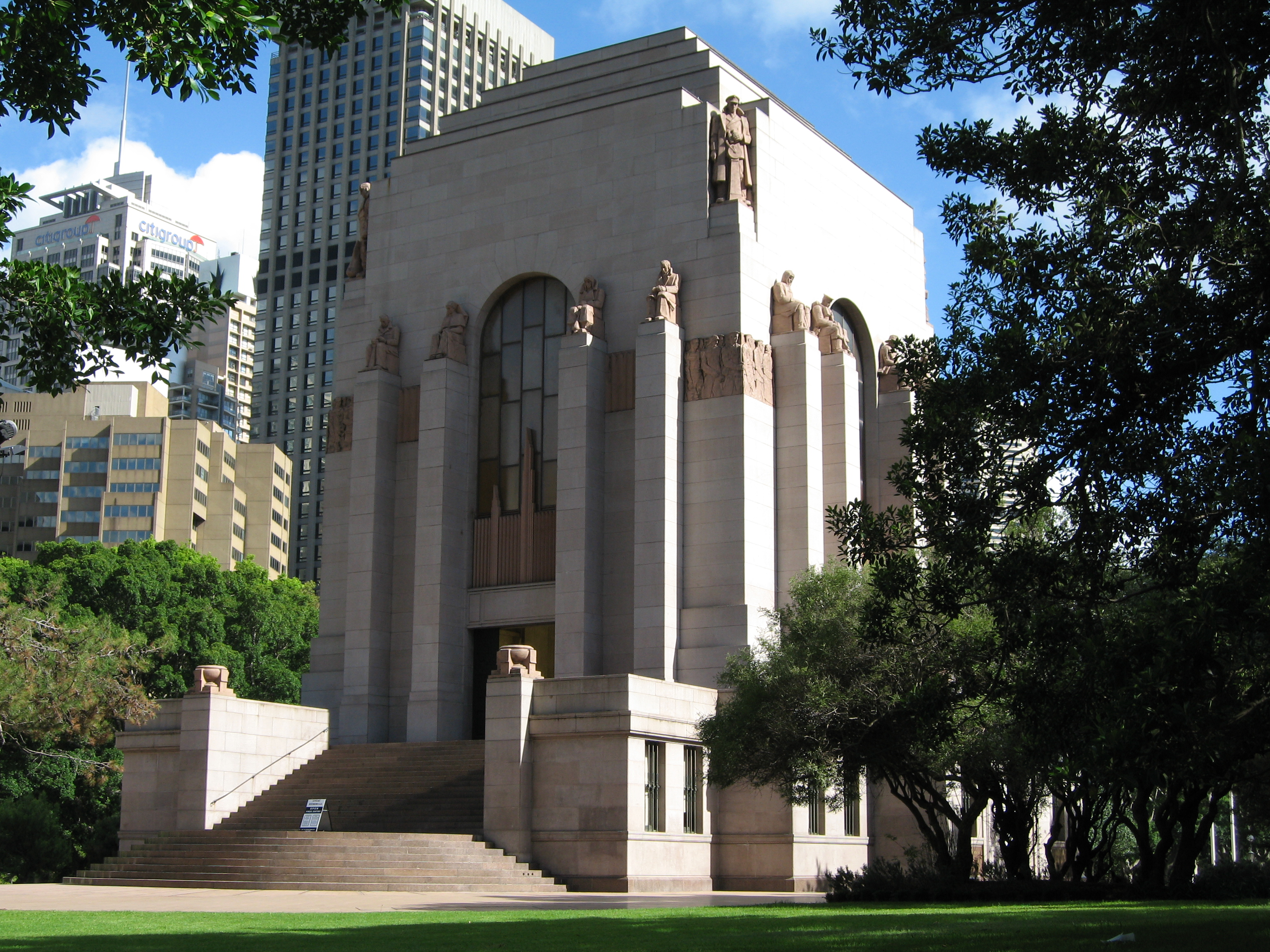
Anzac War Memorial, Sydney; completed 1934.

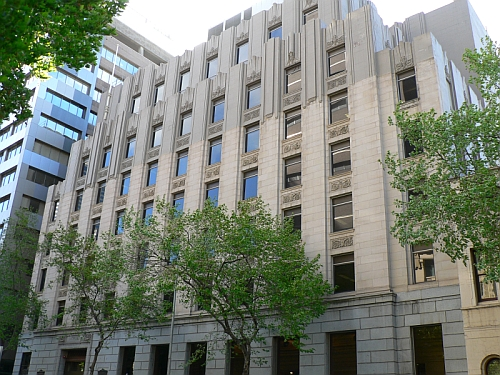
Art Deco office building. Lonsdale Street, Melbourne. Obvious influences of North American skyscraper planning

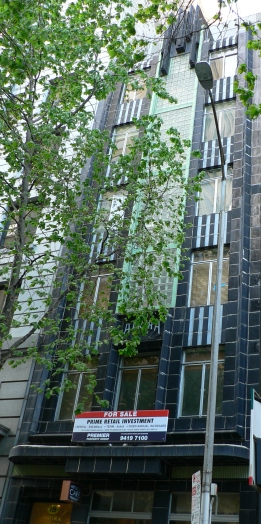
Alkira House, Queen Street, Melbourne. One of the most striking Glazed architectural terra-cotta and glass brick clad Art Deco buildings in Australia

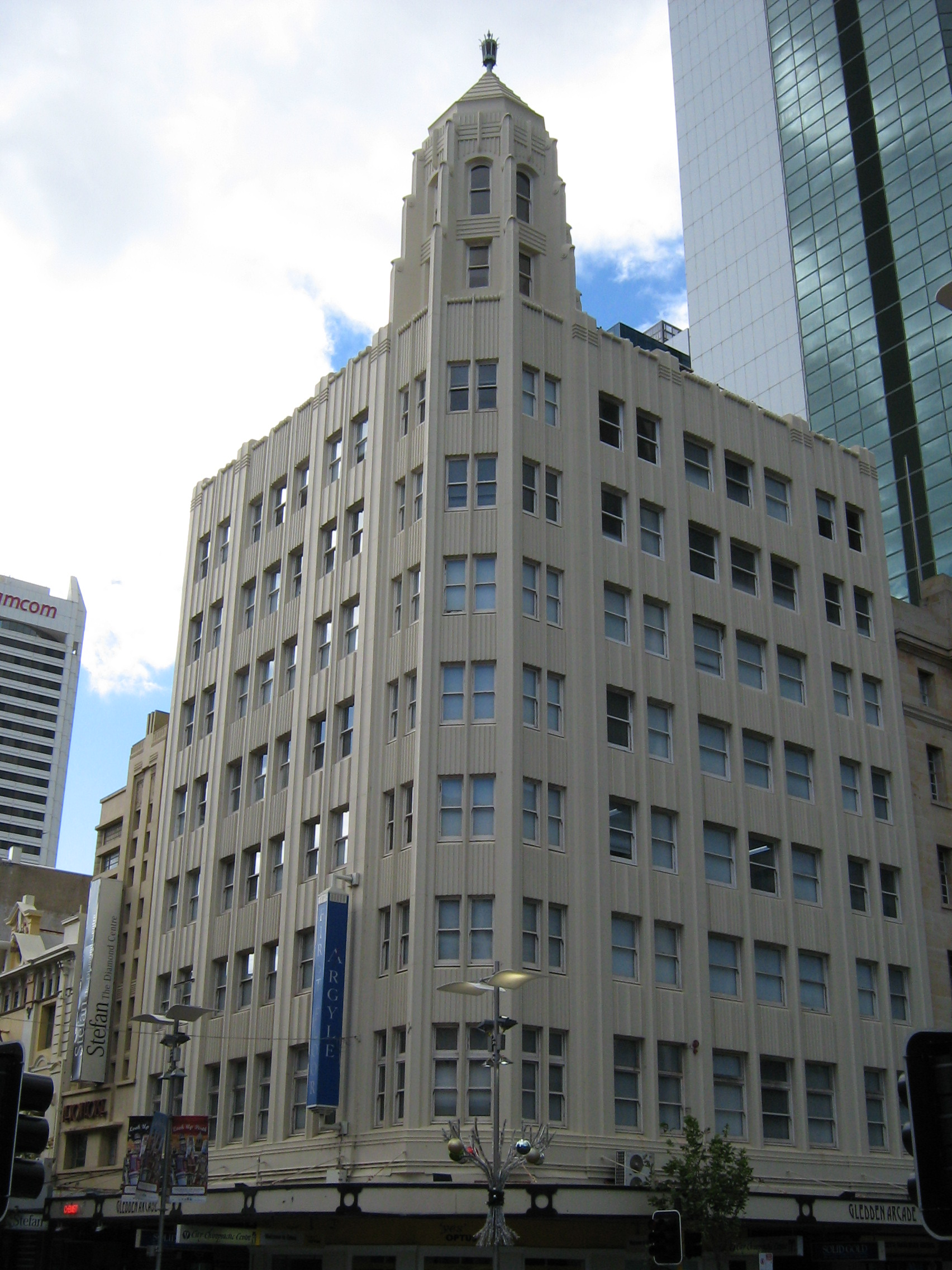
Gledden Building, Perth; completed in 1935. The Gledden Building was the only large commercial building in the Art Deco style ever built in Western Australia

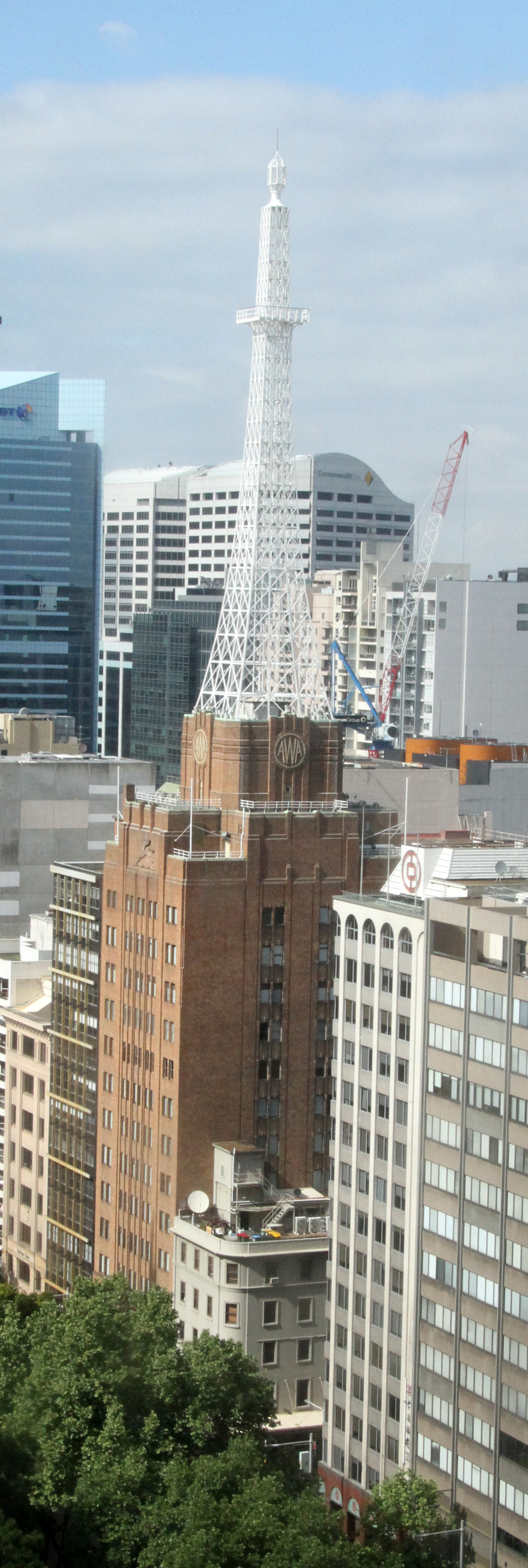
AWA Tower, Sydney

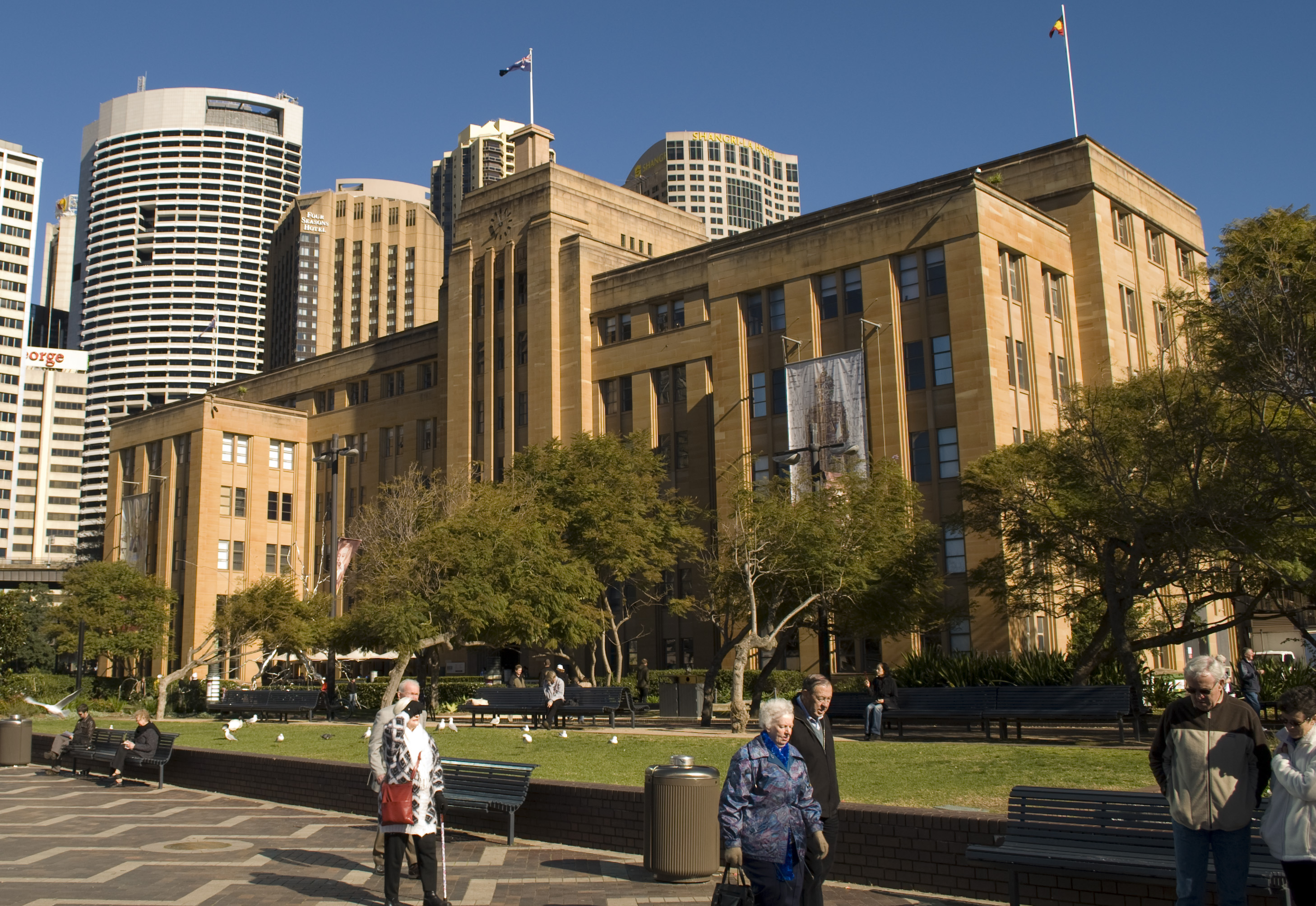
Museum of Contemporary Art, Sydney. Completed 1940s

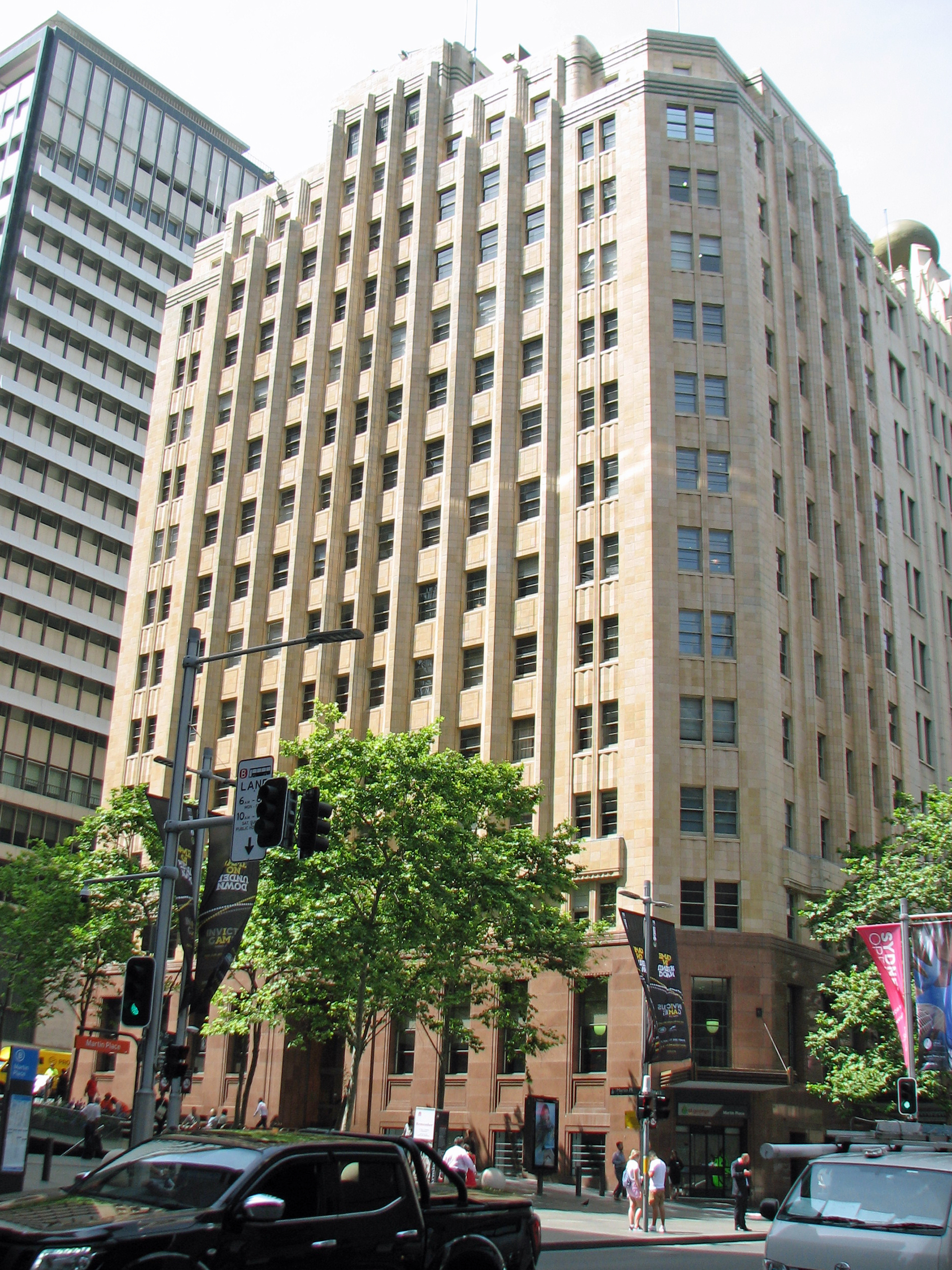
APA Building Martin Place, Sydney

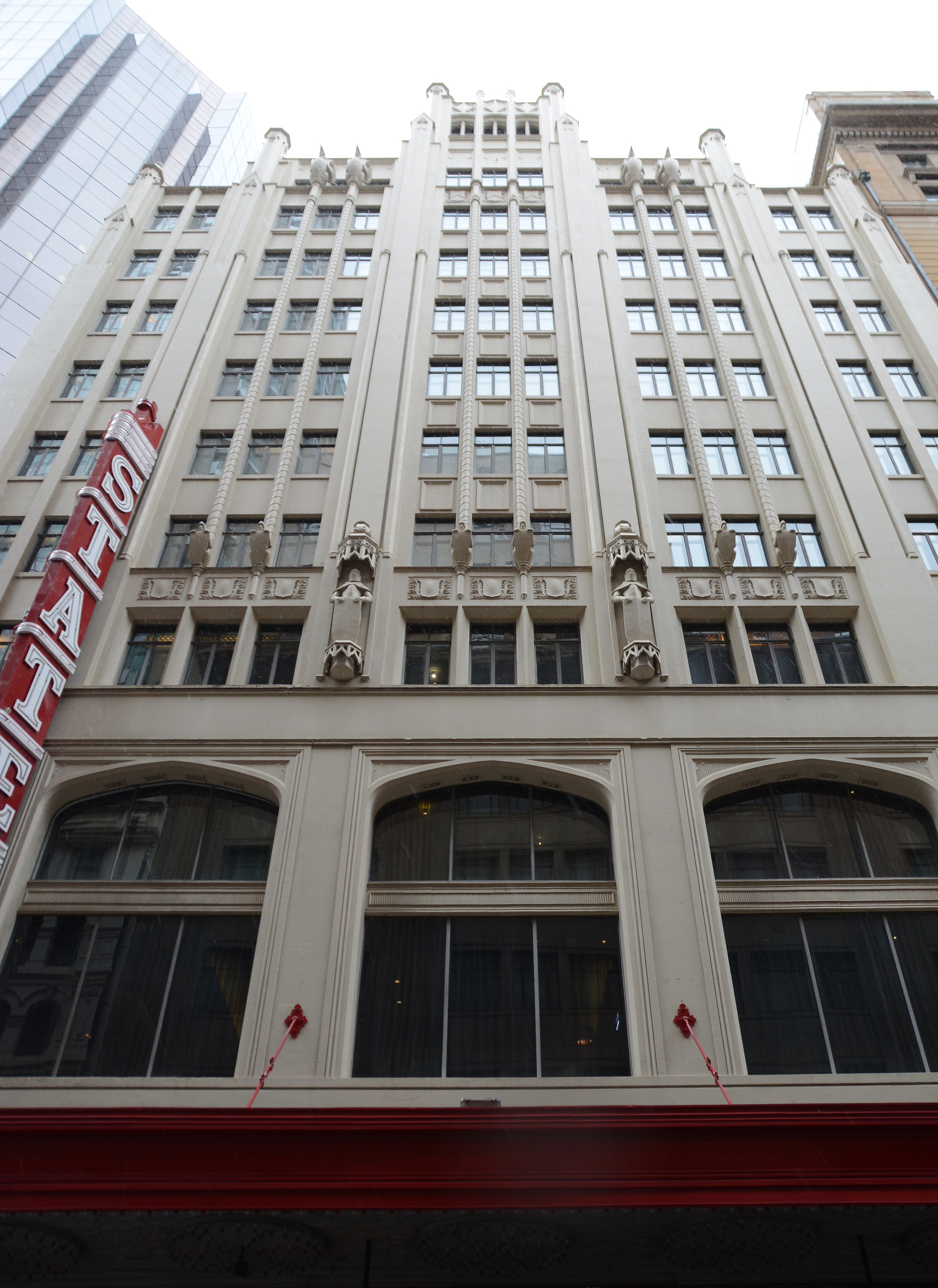
State Theatre, Sydney. Competed 1929

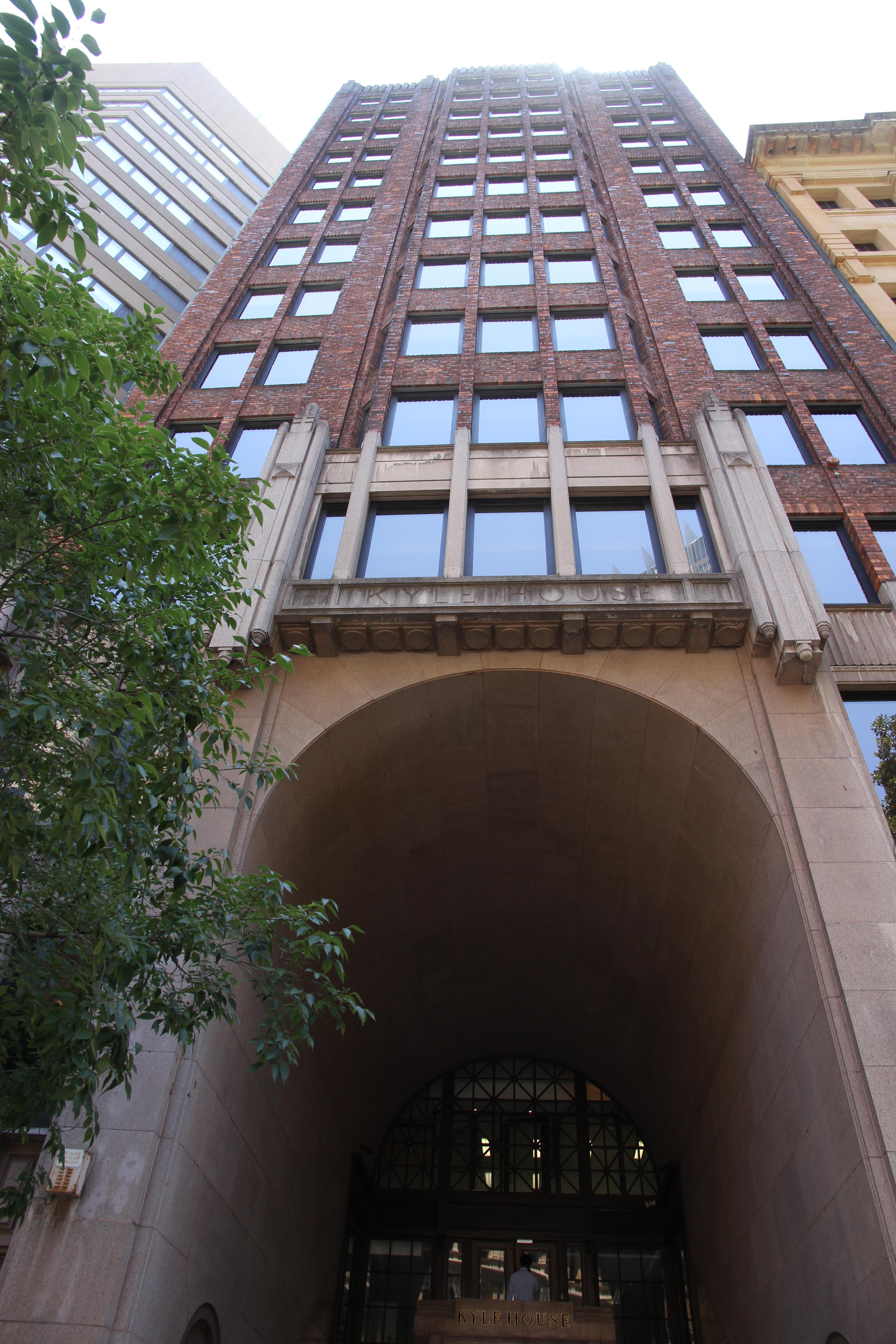
Kyle House, Sydney

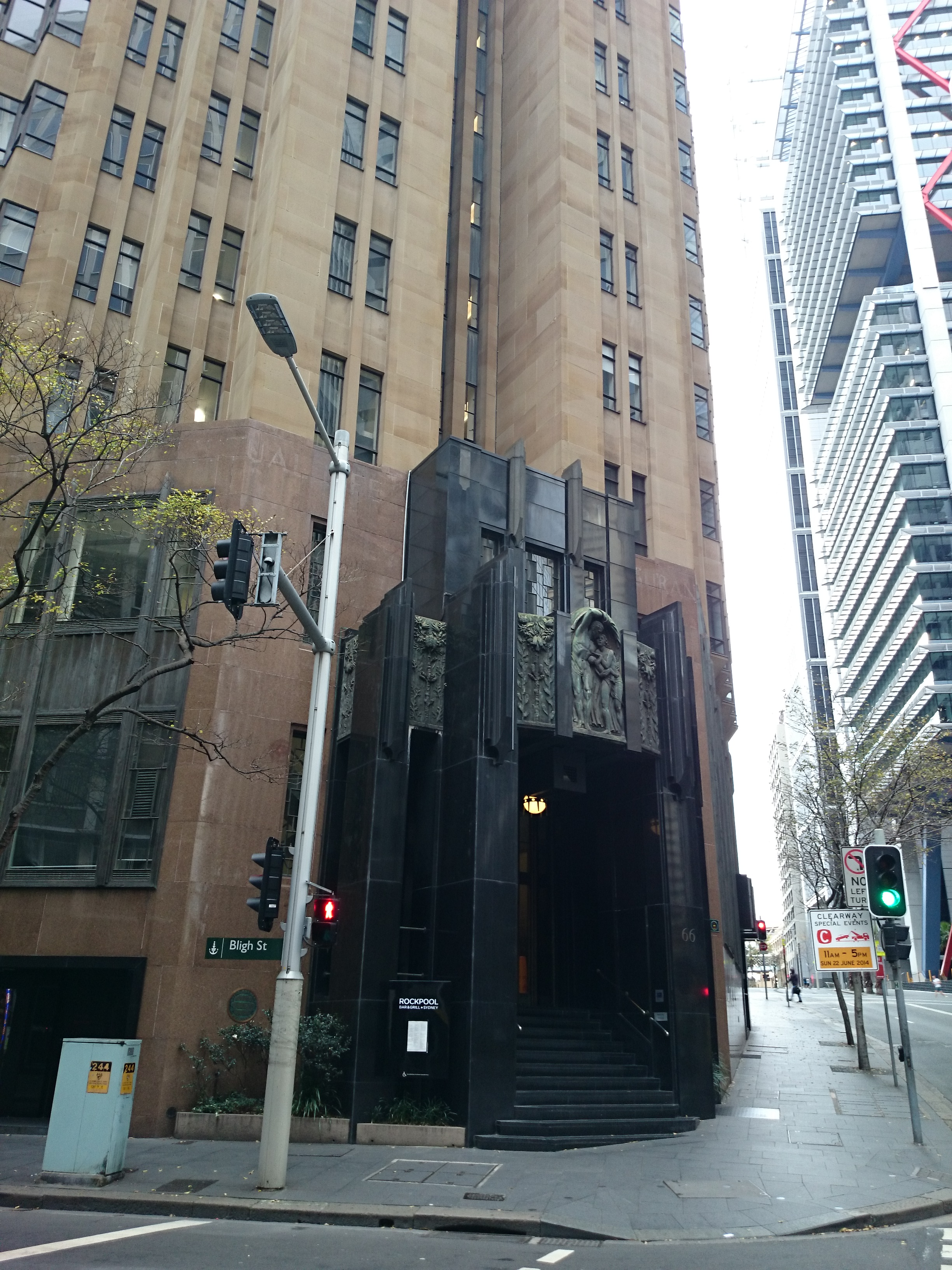
City Mutual Life Assurance Building, Sydney. Completed 1936

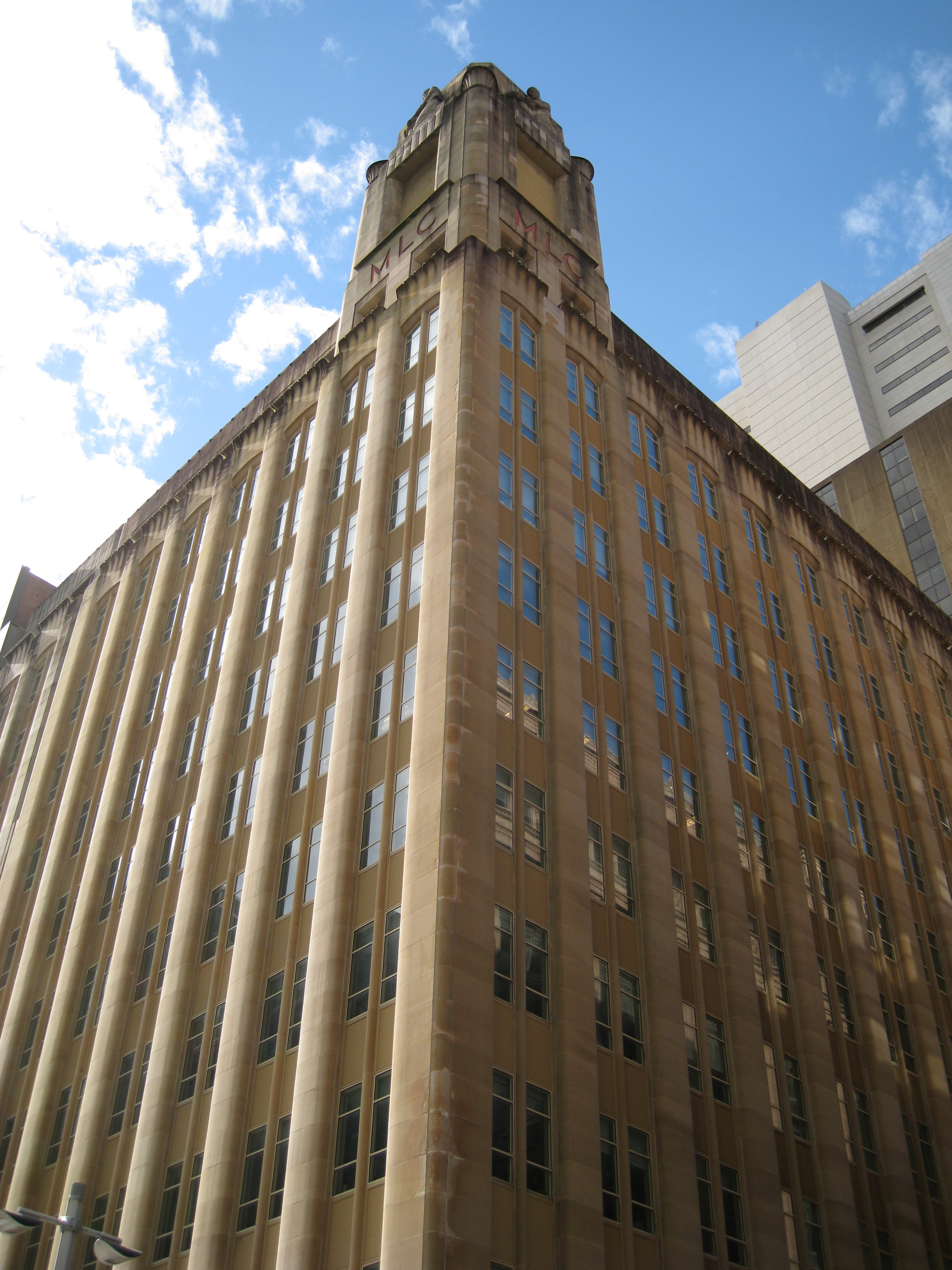
Henry Davis York Building, Sydney.

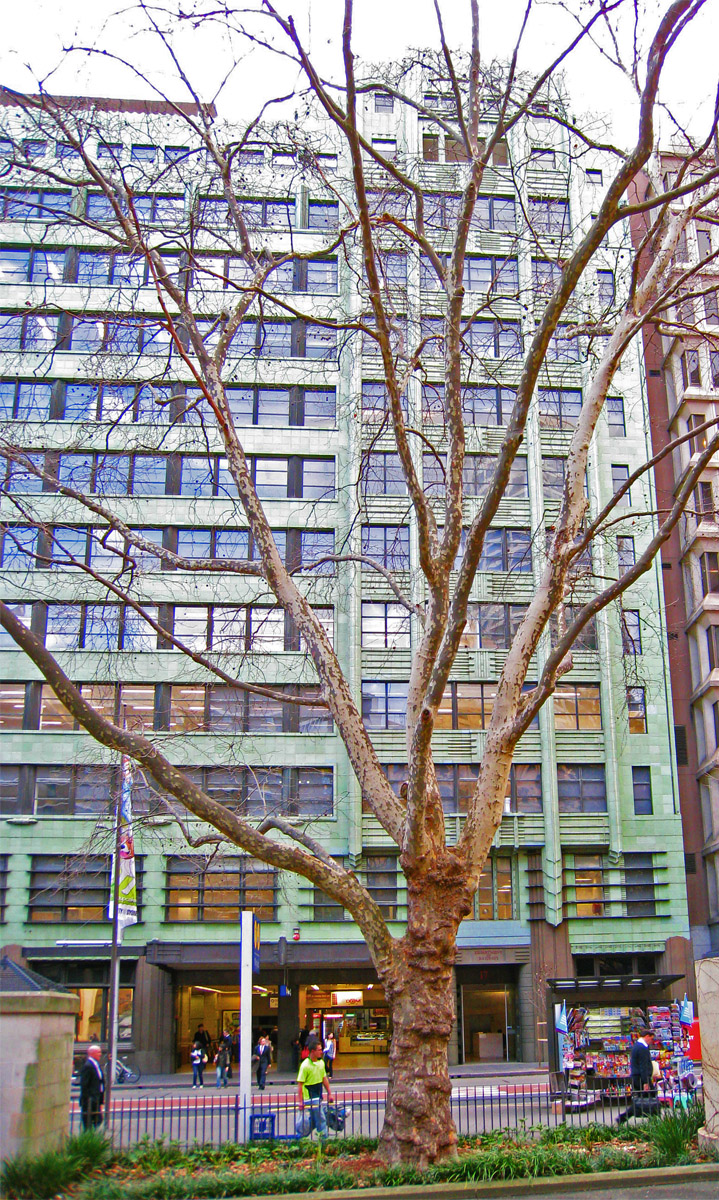
Railway House, York Street, Sydney

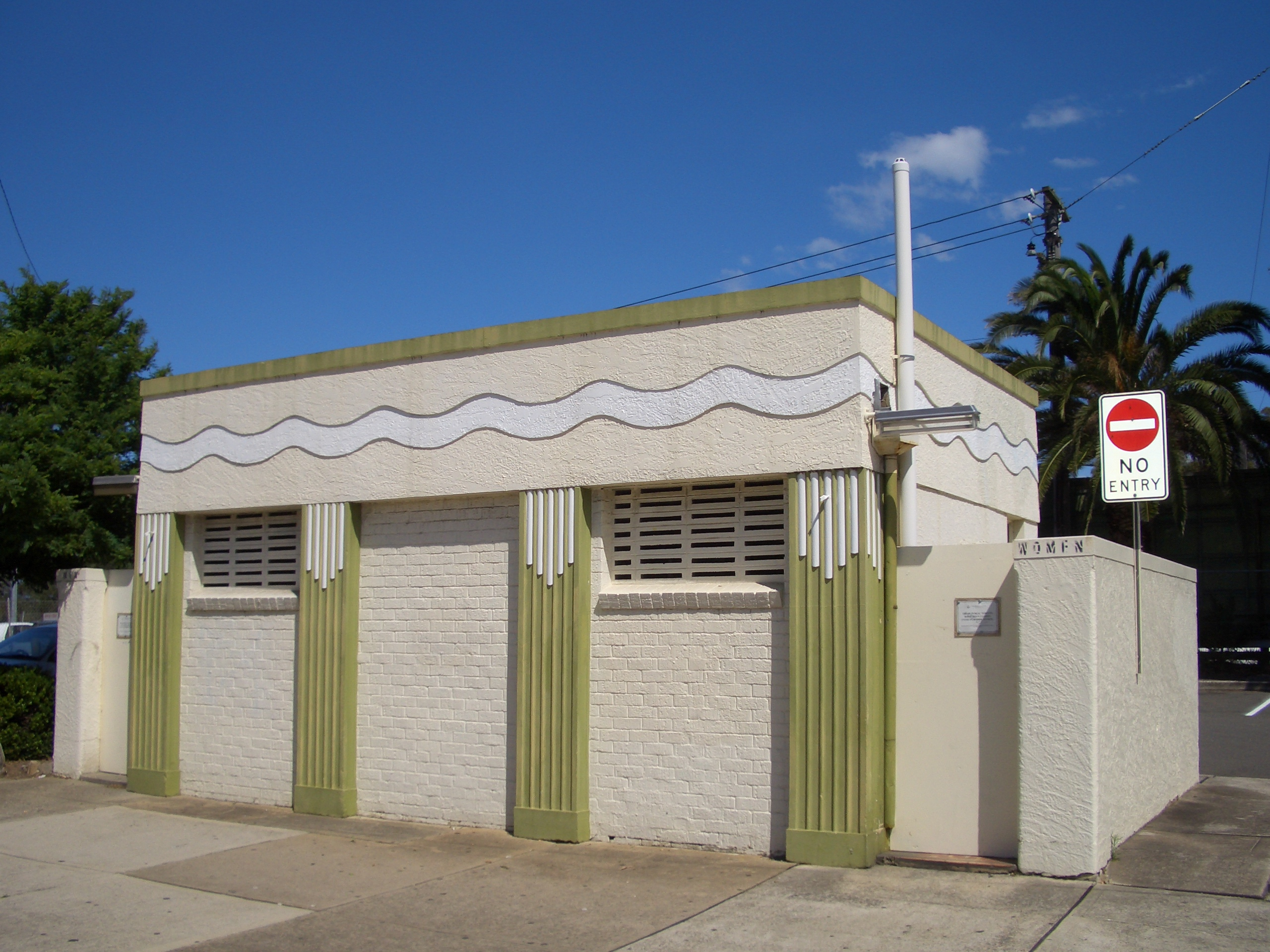
Toilet Block, Belmore.

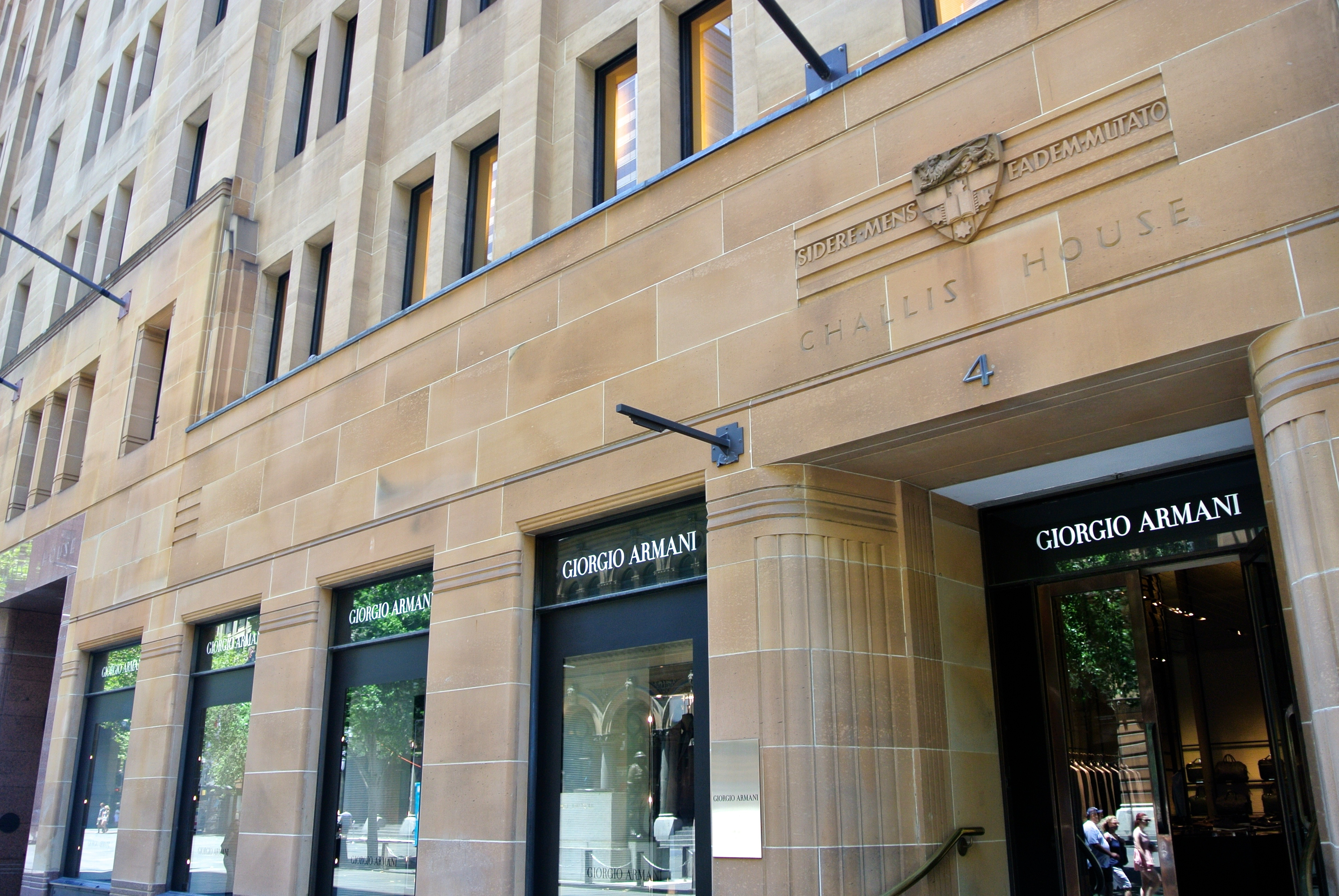
Challis House, Martin Place, Sydney. Completed 1938

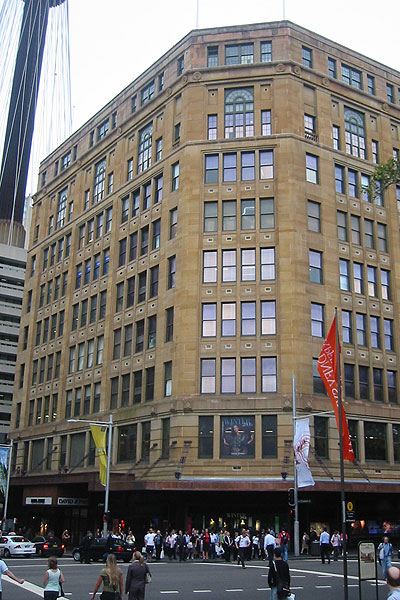
David Jones Building, Elizabeth Street, Sydney

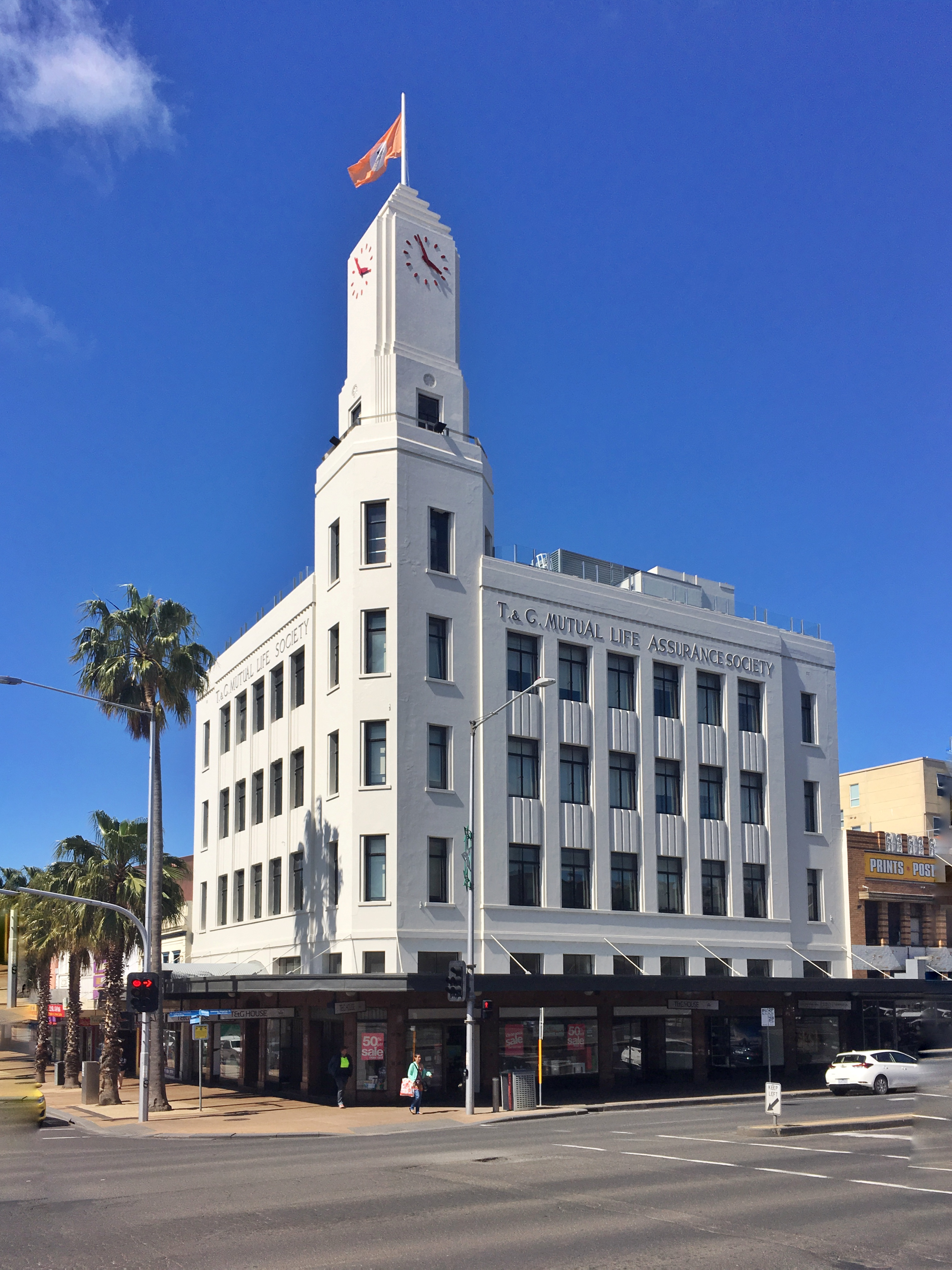
T&G Geelong, 1934

=== Skyscraper Gothic ===
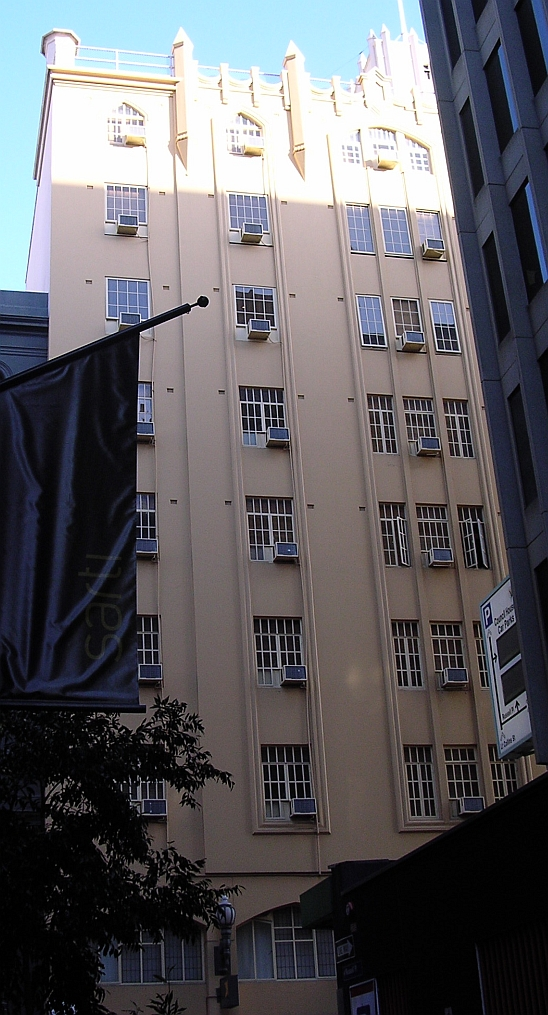
Victoria Hotel on Little Collins Street, Melbourne

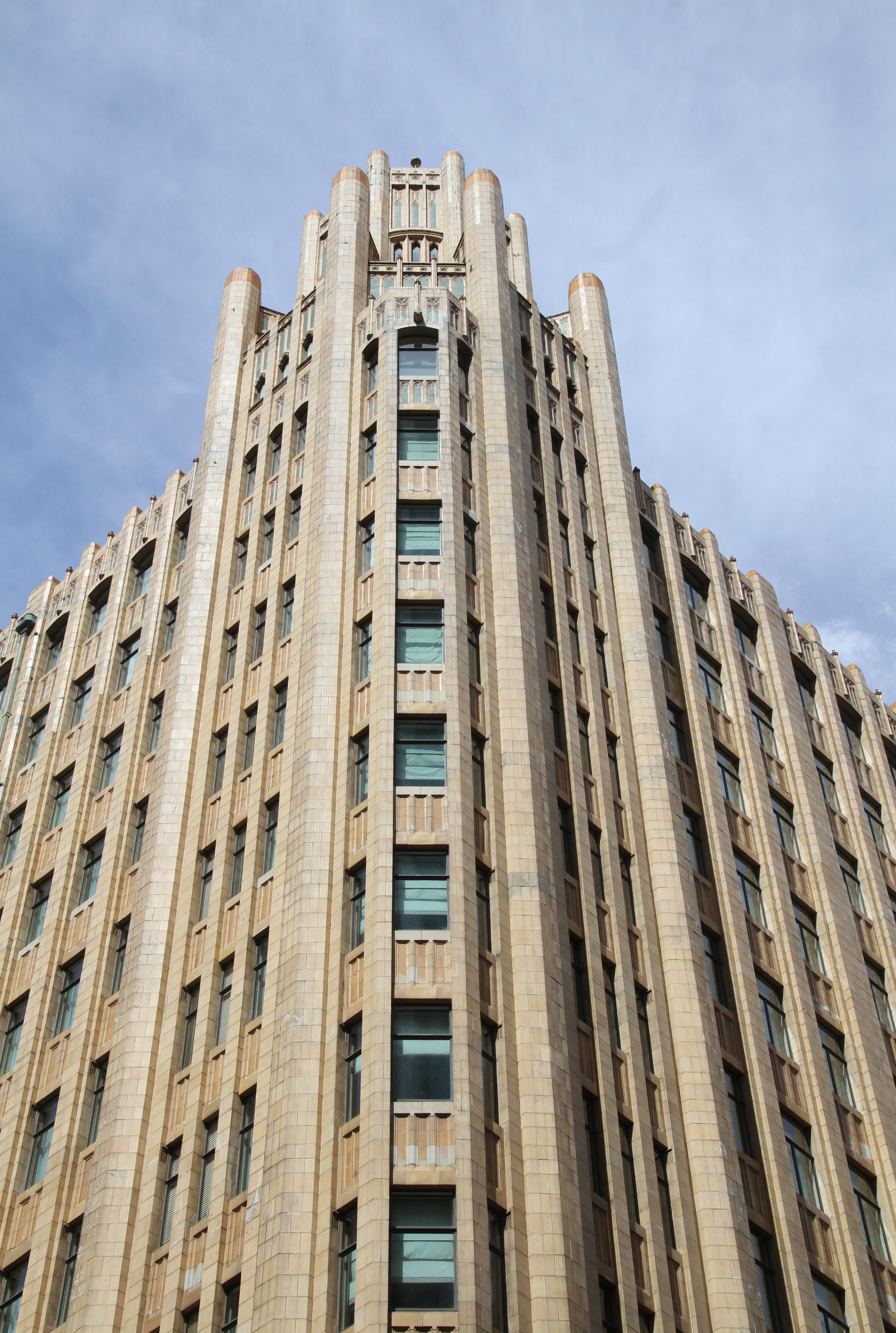
Grace Building, Sydney

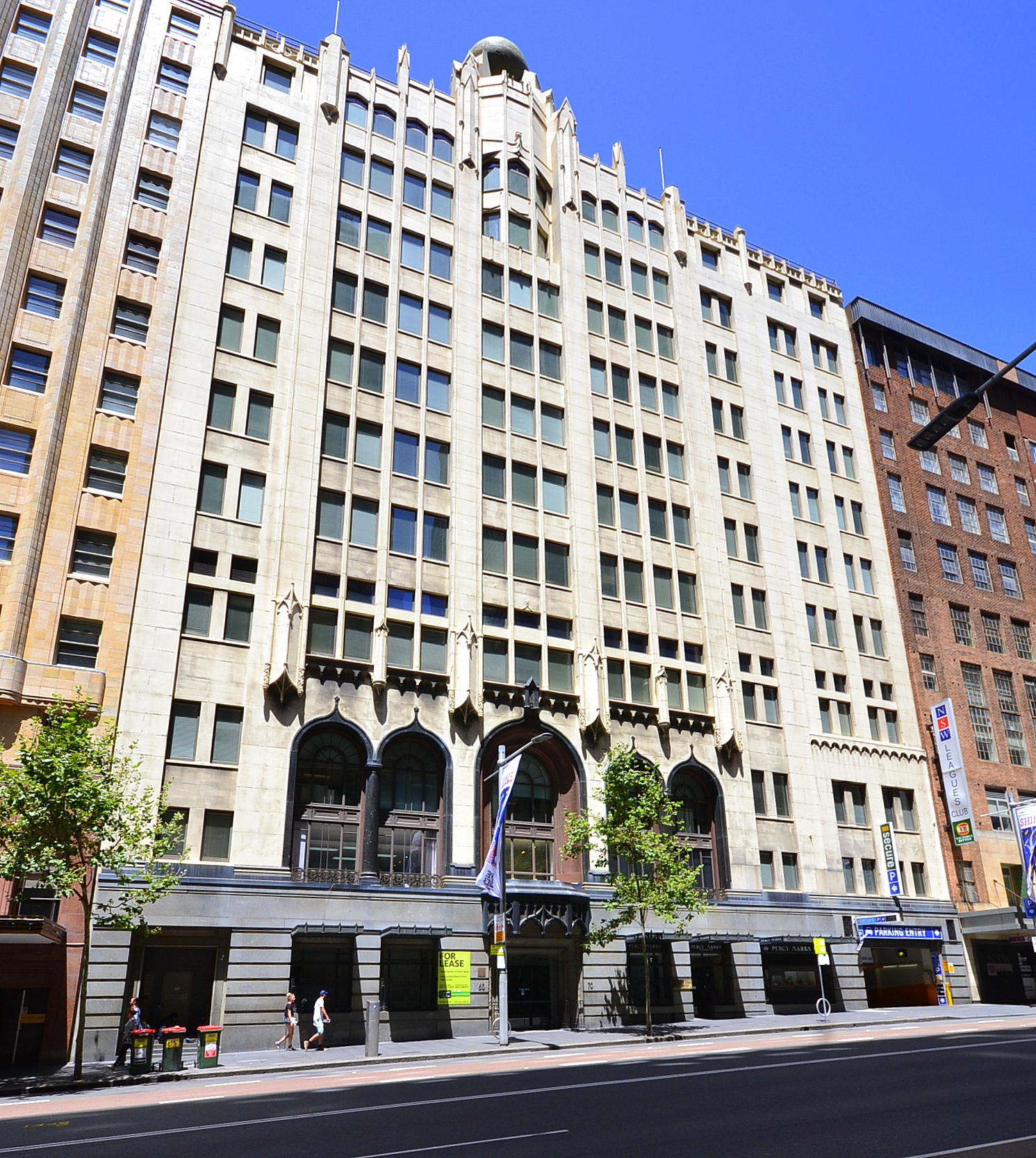
Former Sun building

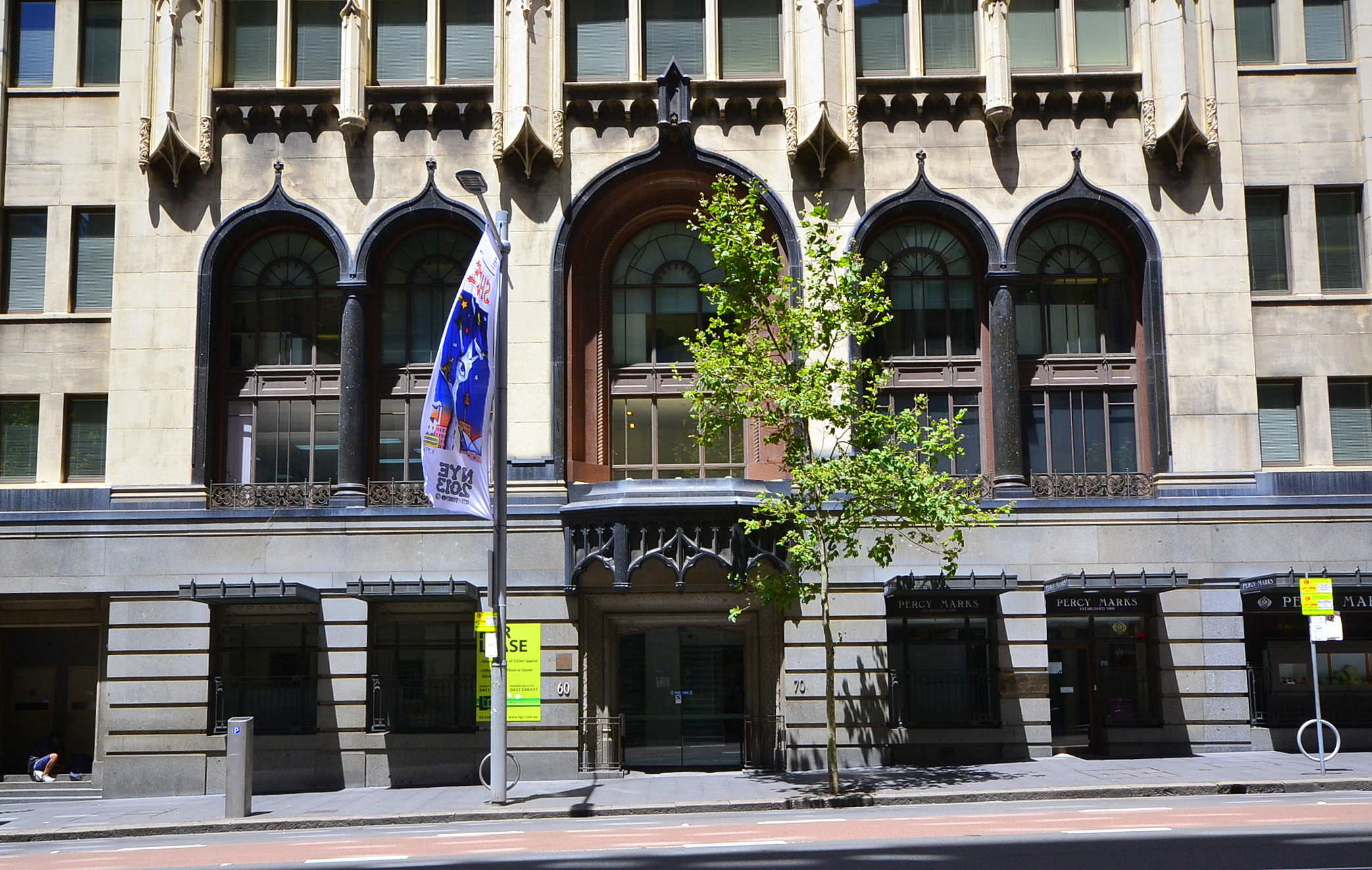
Former Sun building, Elizabeth Street, Sydney

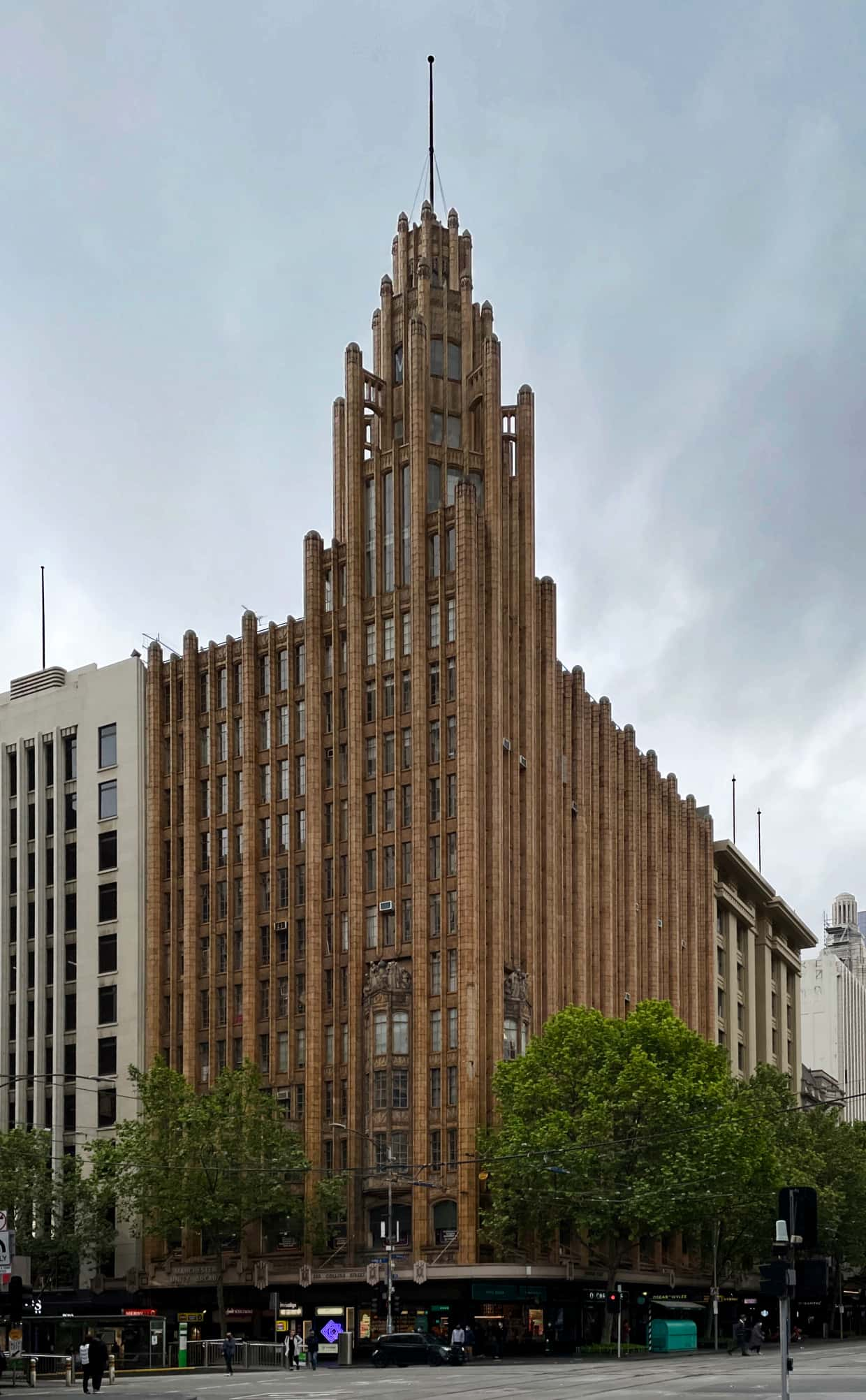
Manchester Unity Building, Collins Street, Melbourne

=== Inter-war Chicagoesque ===
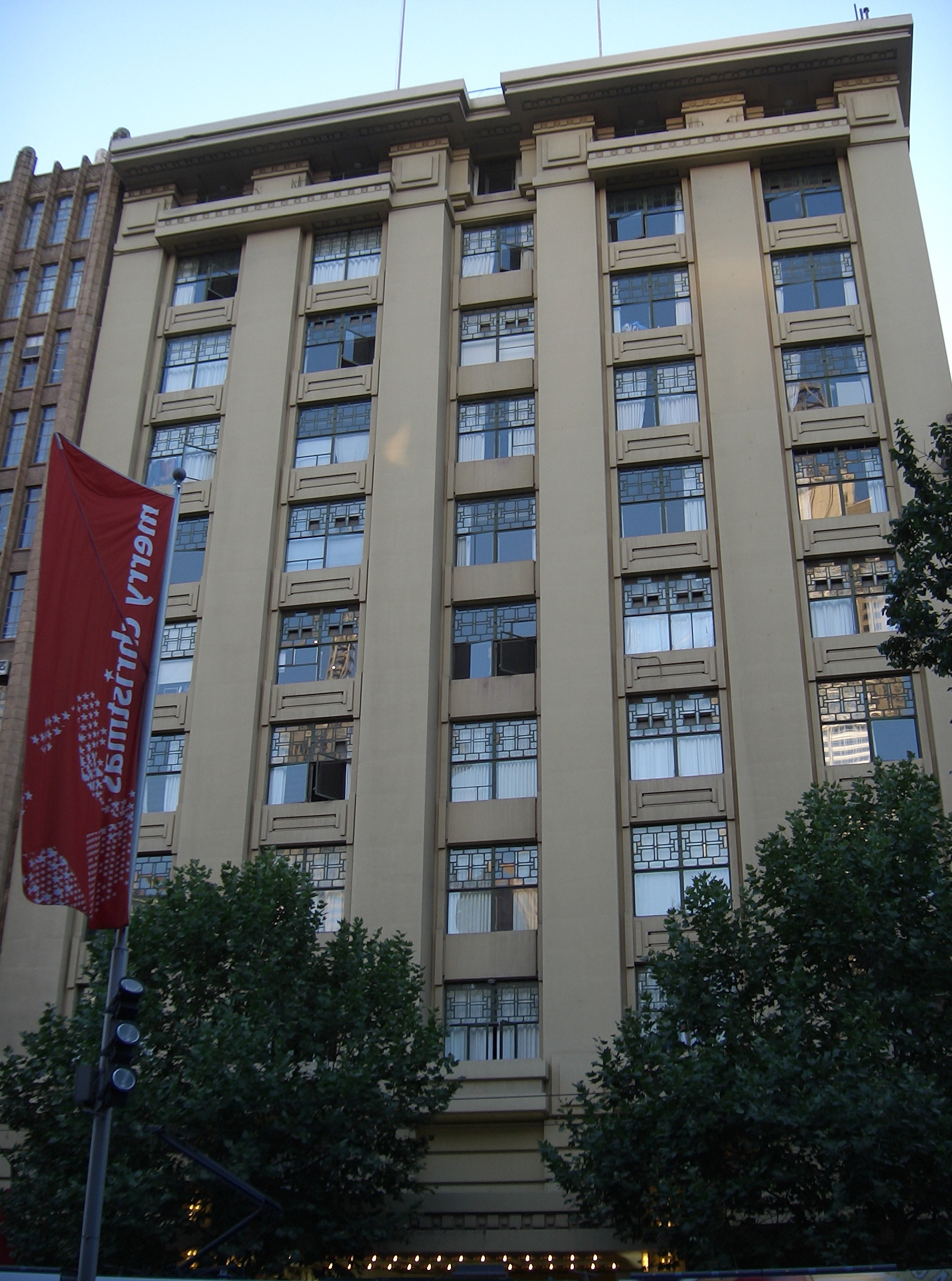
Capitol Theatre, Swanston Street, Melbourne; opened in 1924

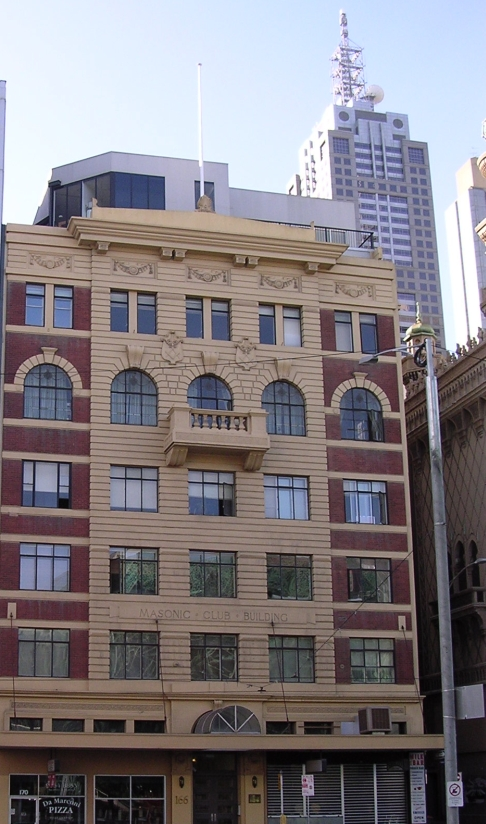
Former Masonic Club, Flinders Street, Melbourne

Powerhouse, Brisbane

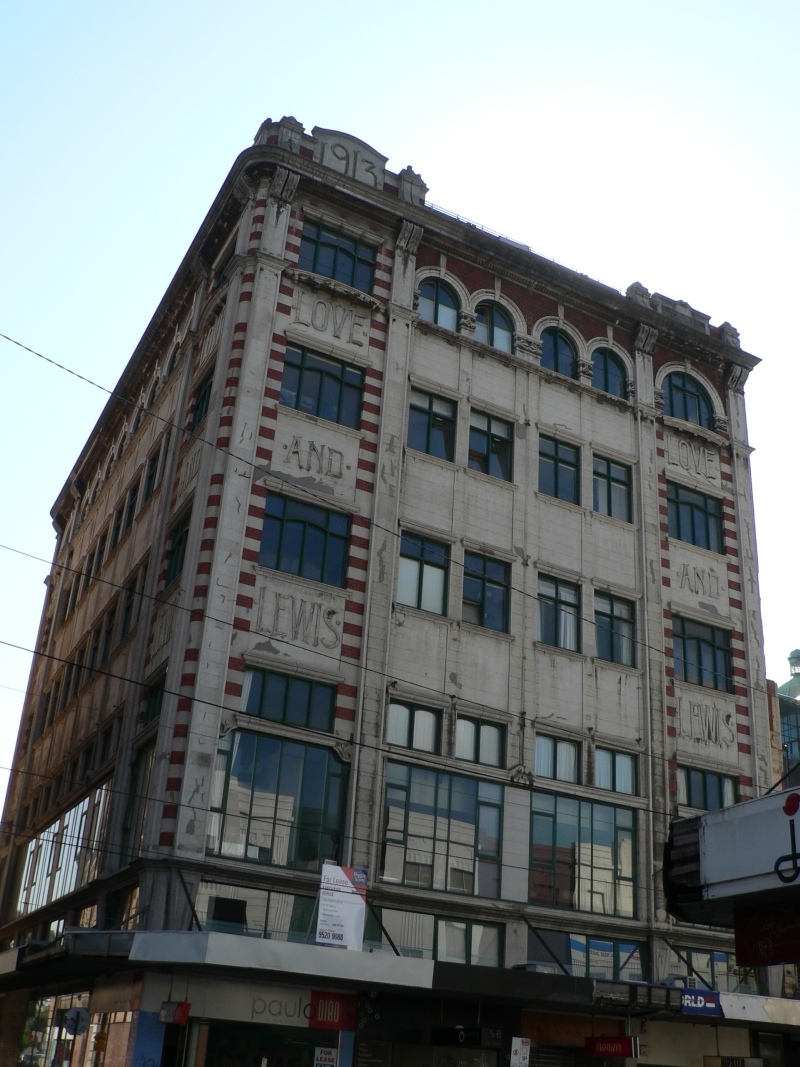
Love and Lewis building. Prahran; completed in 1928

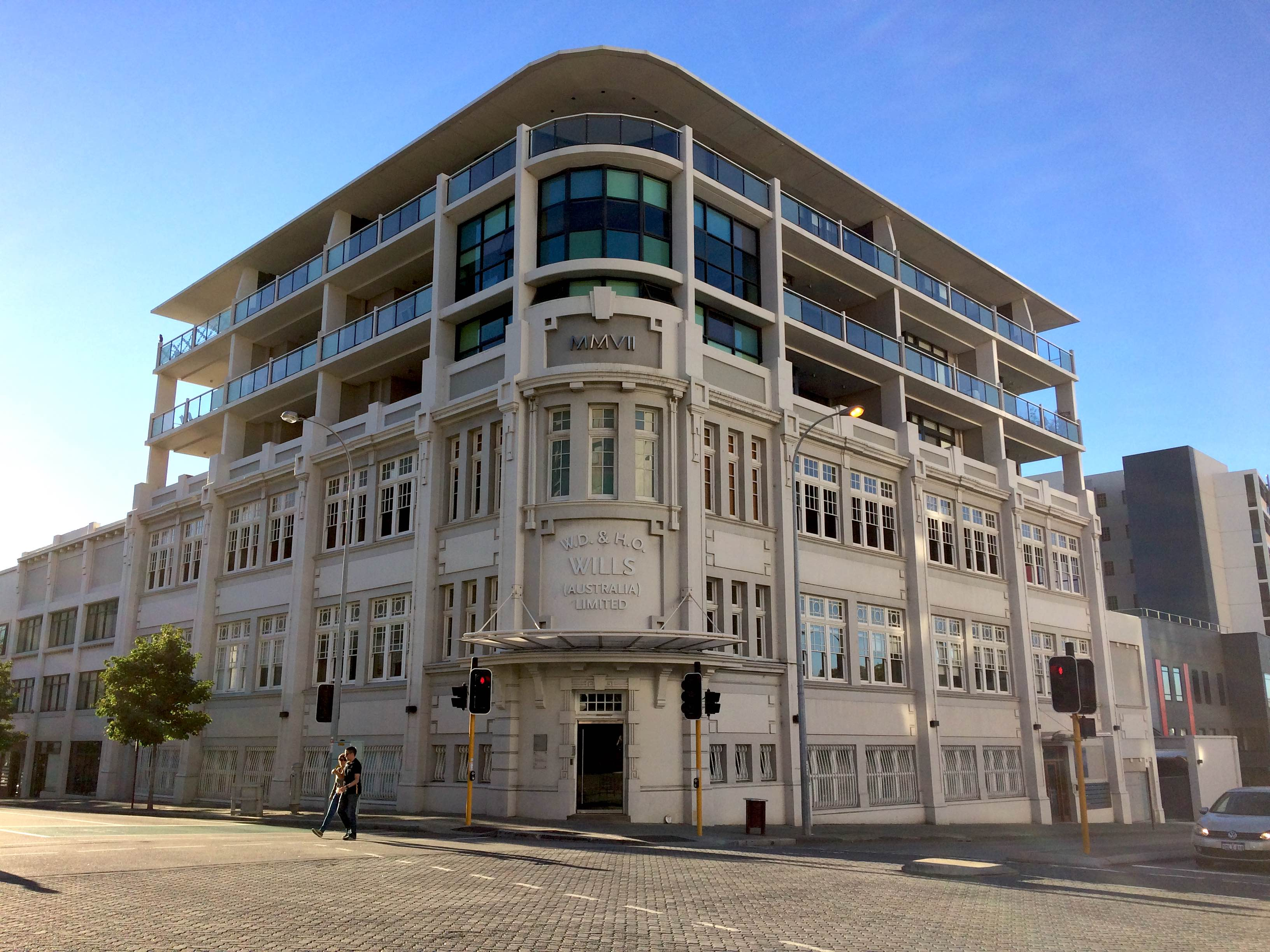
WD and HO Wills Building, Perth, Western Australia; completed 1927

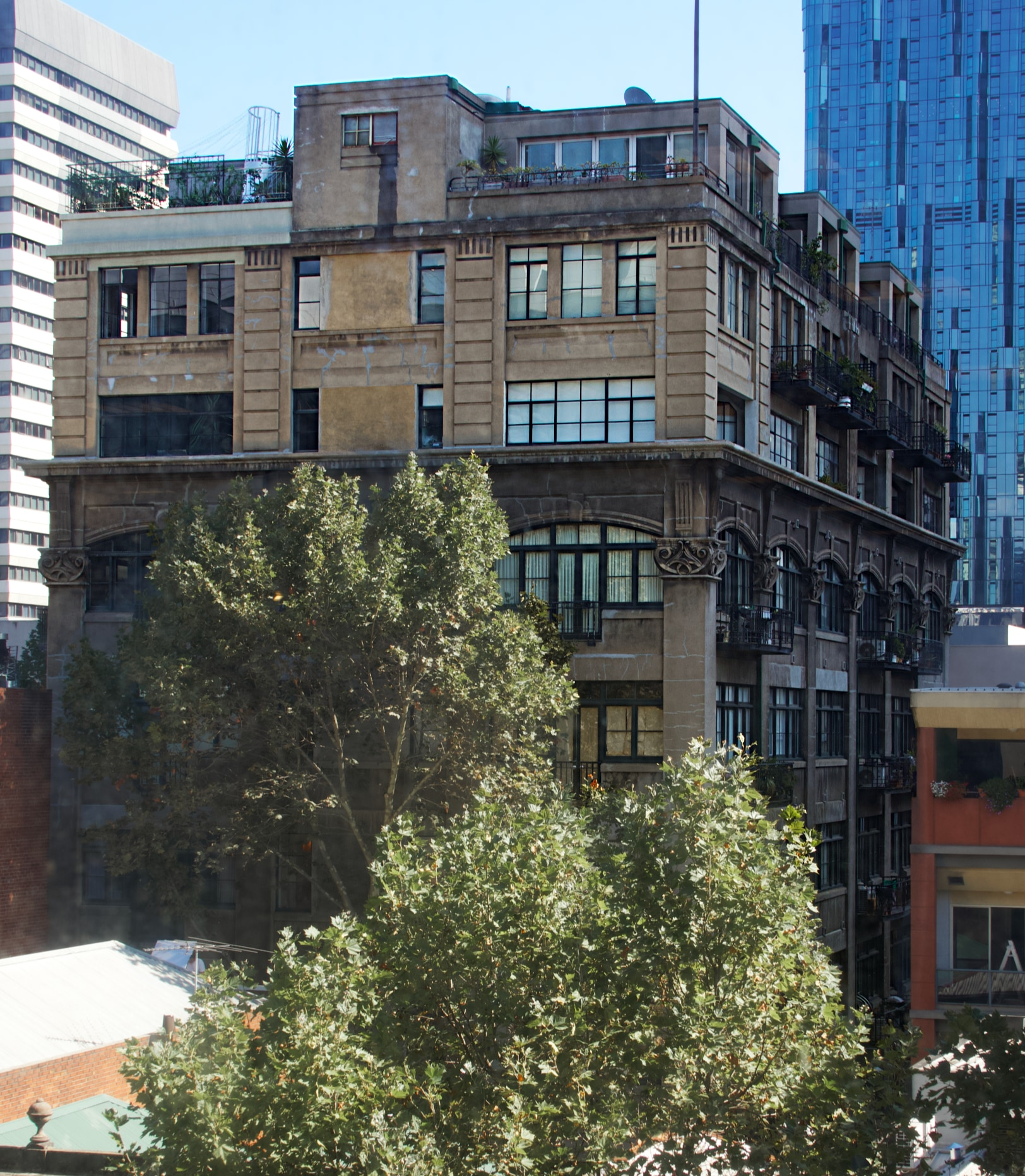
Dovers Building, by Hugh Ralston Crawford; completed 1908
- Ballarat House, Wentworth Avenue, Surry Hills; 1915
- Former Cleveland Shoe Company Factory, Victoria Street, Erskineville; 1923
- Former Wrigley's Factory, Crewe Place, Rosebery; 1919

=== Inter-war Functionalist & Moderne ===
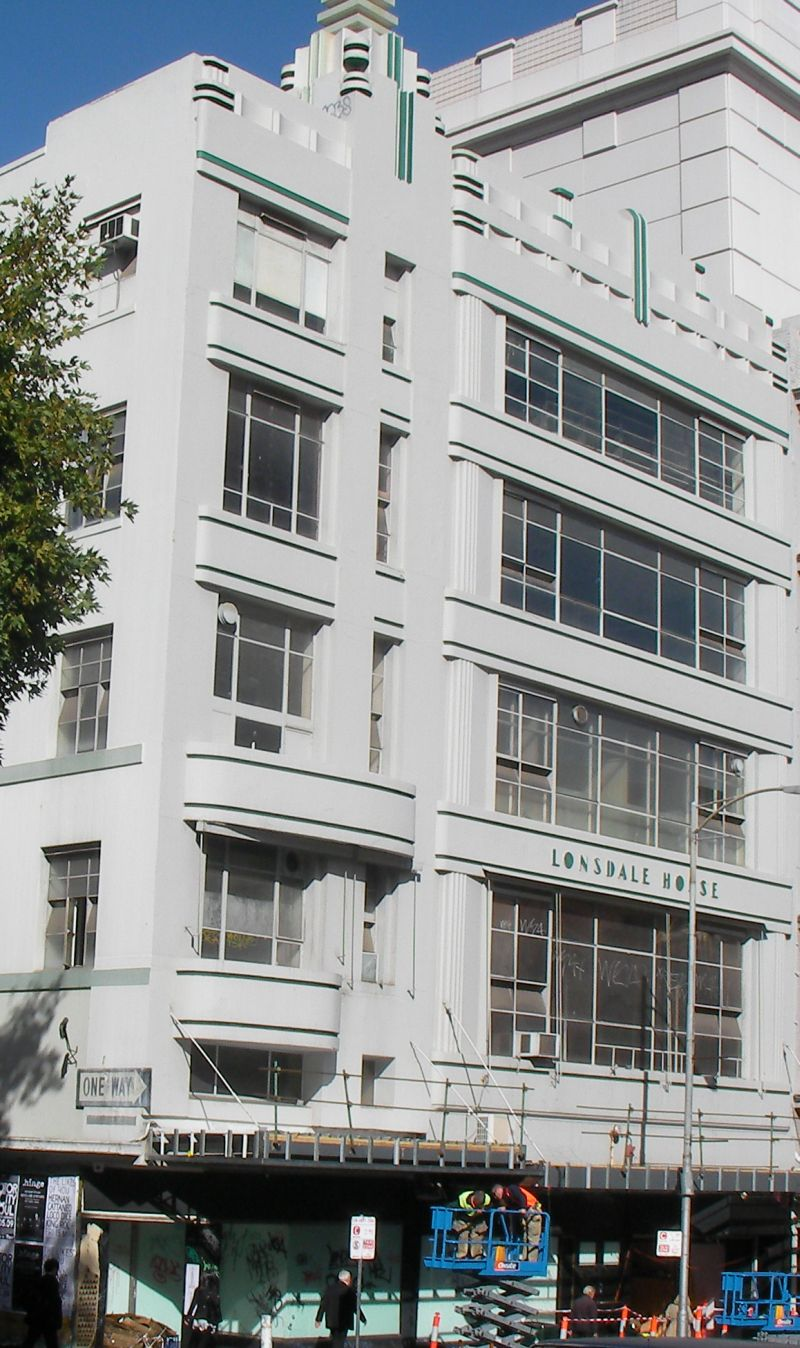
Lonsdale House, Lonsdale Street, Melbourne; architect IG Anderson; completed 1937; demolished 2010

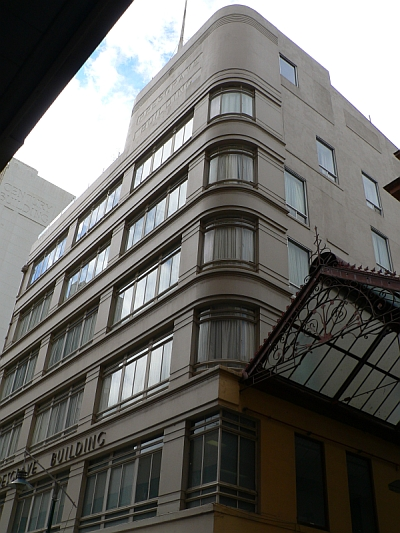
Presgrave Building, Little Collins Street, Melbourne; completed 1938

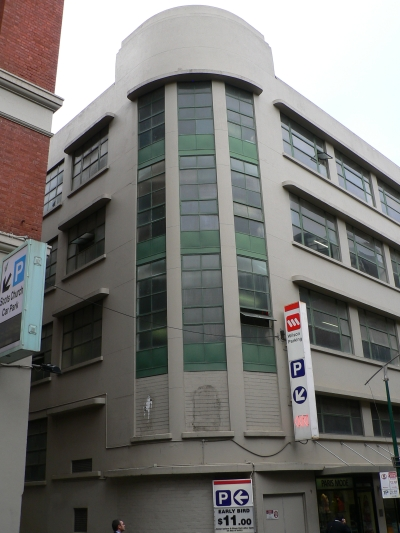
Former Victoria carpark, Little Collins Street, Melbourne; completed 1939; Melbourne's oldest multi-storey carpark in the streamline moderne style

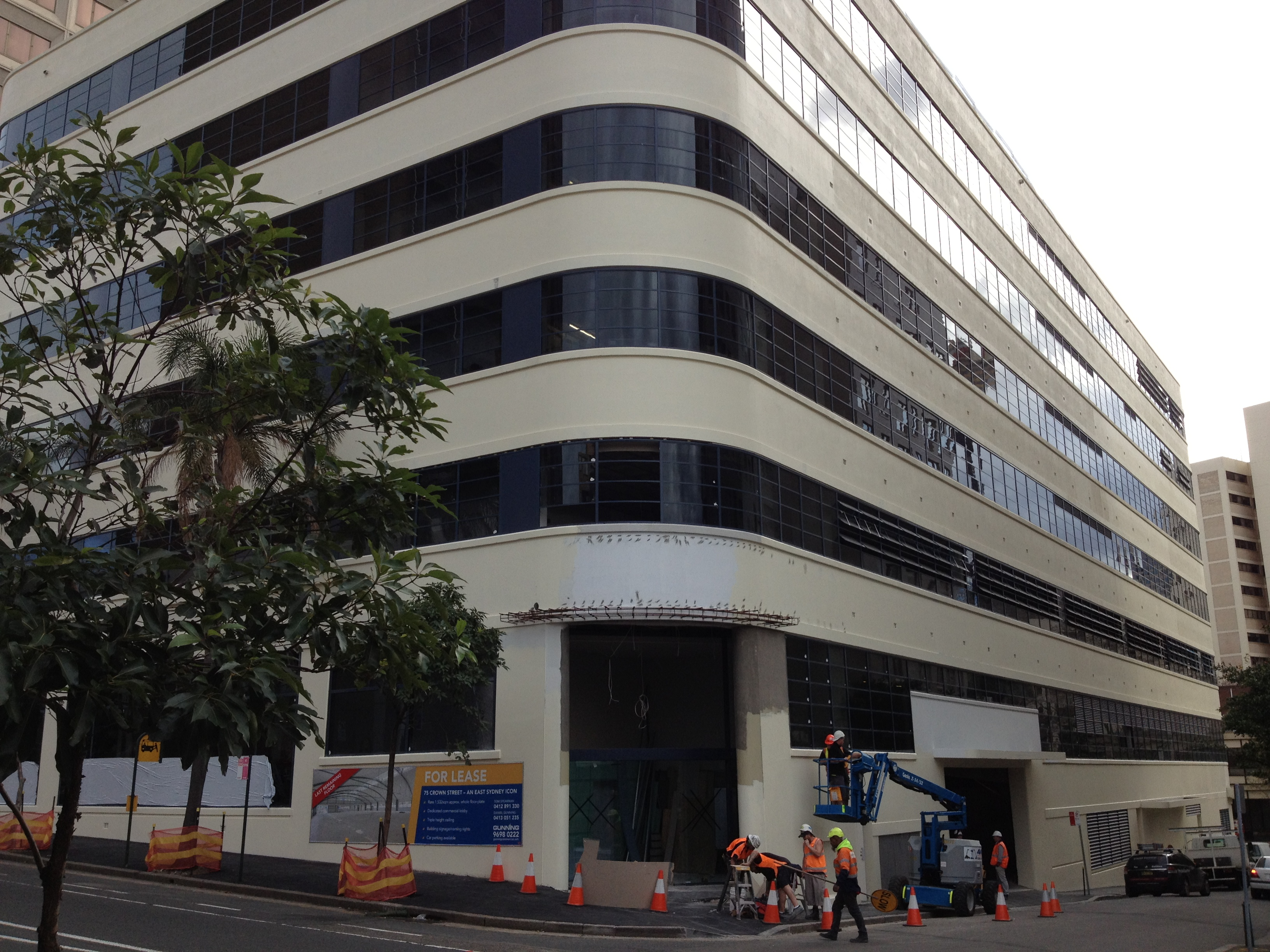
Hastings Deering, Crown Street, Woolloomooloo; Architects Lipson & Kaad; completed 1938; refurbished 2013

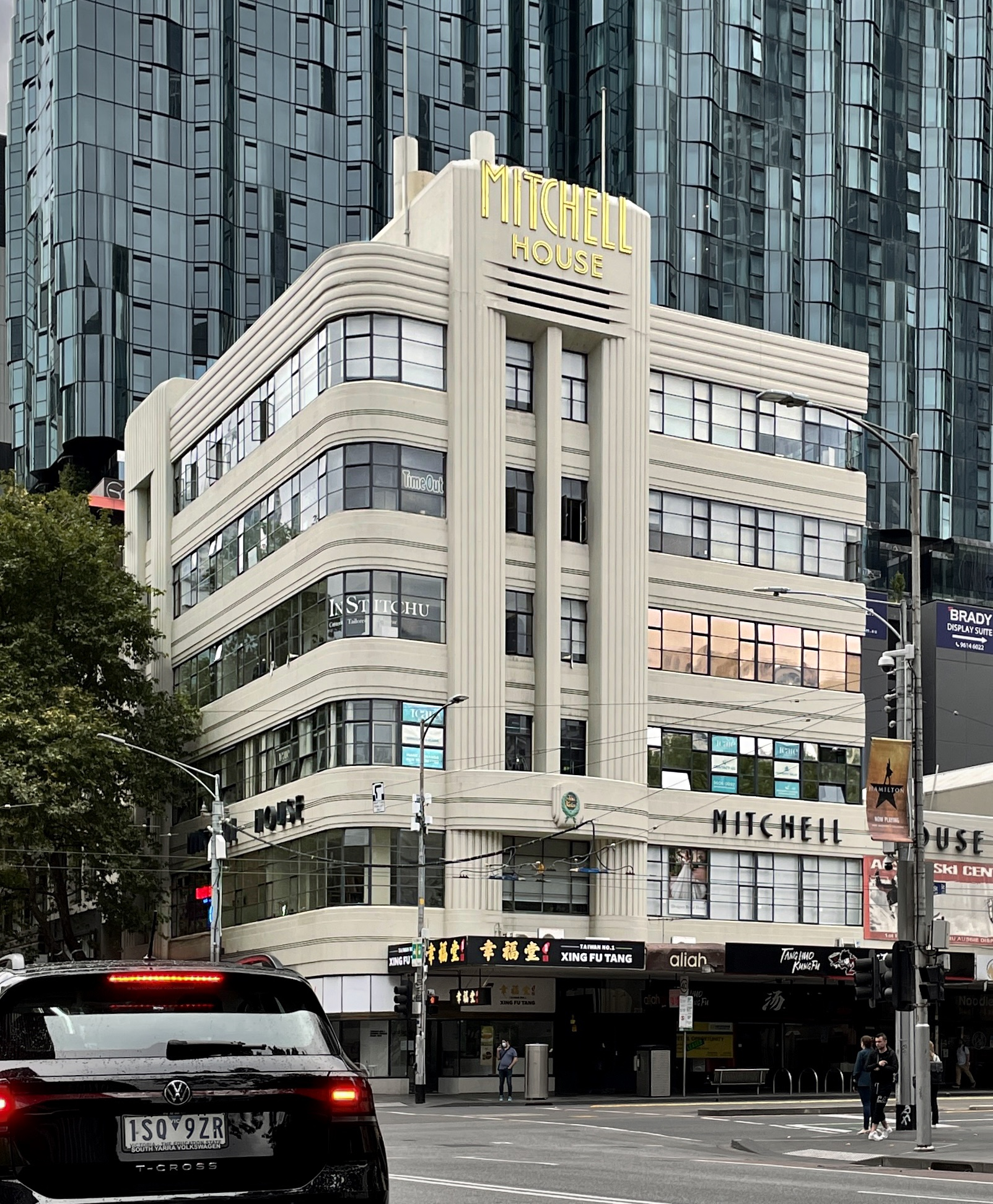
Mitchell House, a 1937 Streamline Moderne style building built in 1937 Melbourne

=== Interwar Gothic ===
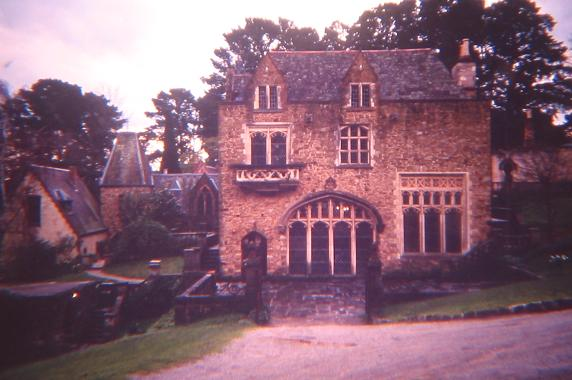
Montsalvat artists colony (Great Hall), Eltham; re-uses architectural elements from demolished Collins Street buildings; completed 1938

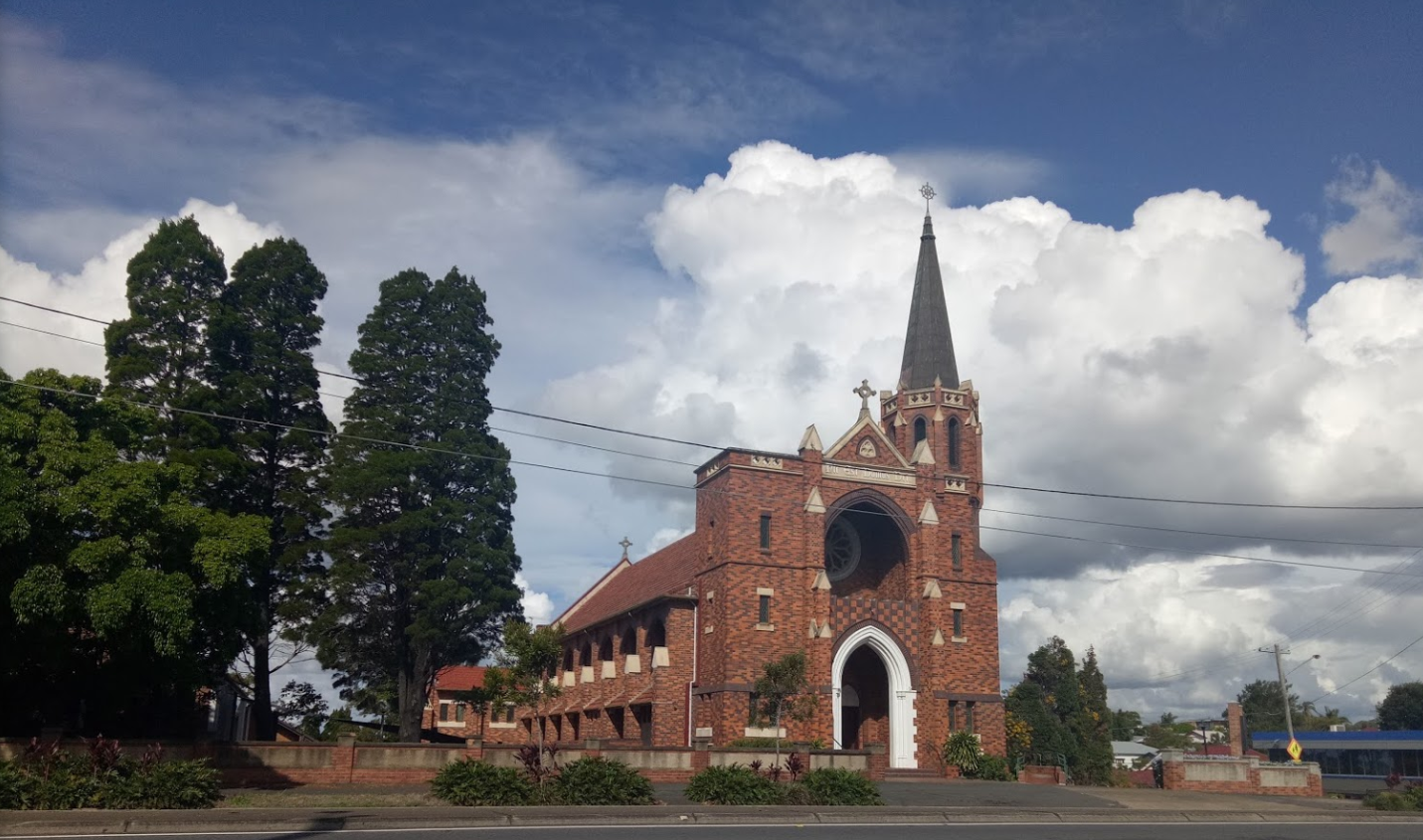
Mary Immaculate Church, in Annerley, Brisbane, built between 1931 and 1939.

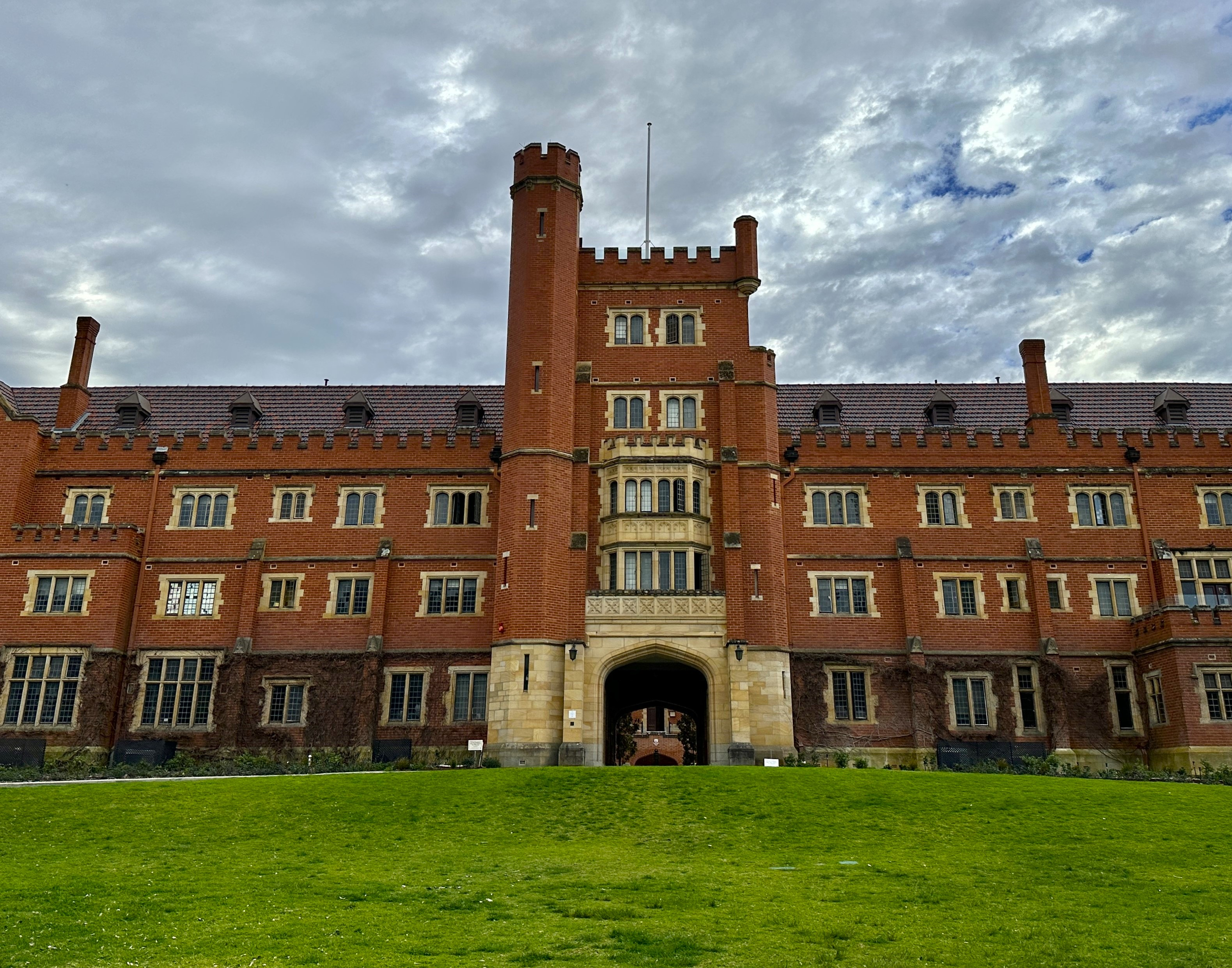
St George's College, Perth; opened 1931 and partially modelled after Selwyn College, Cambridge.

=== Inter-war Old English (20th Century Tudorbethan) ===
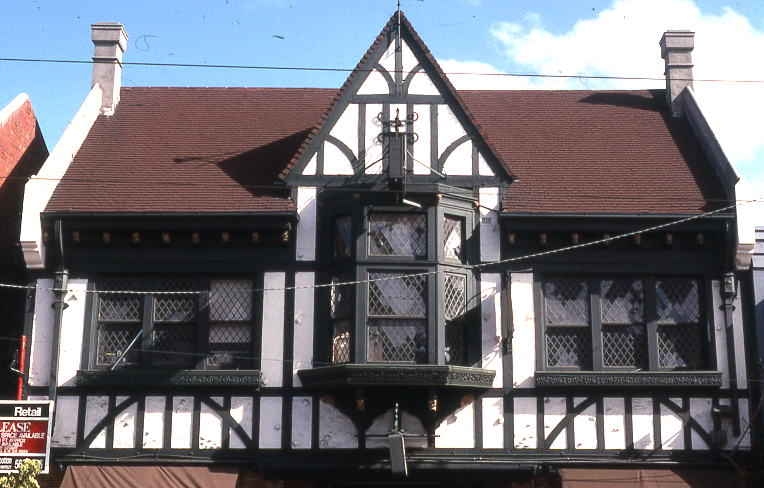
Shopfront in Toorak, Victoria

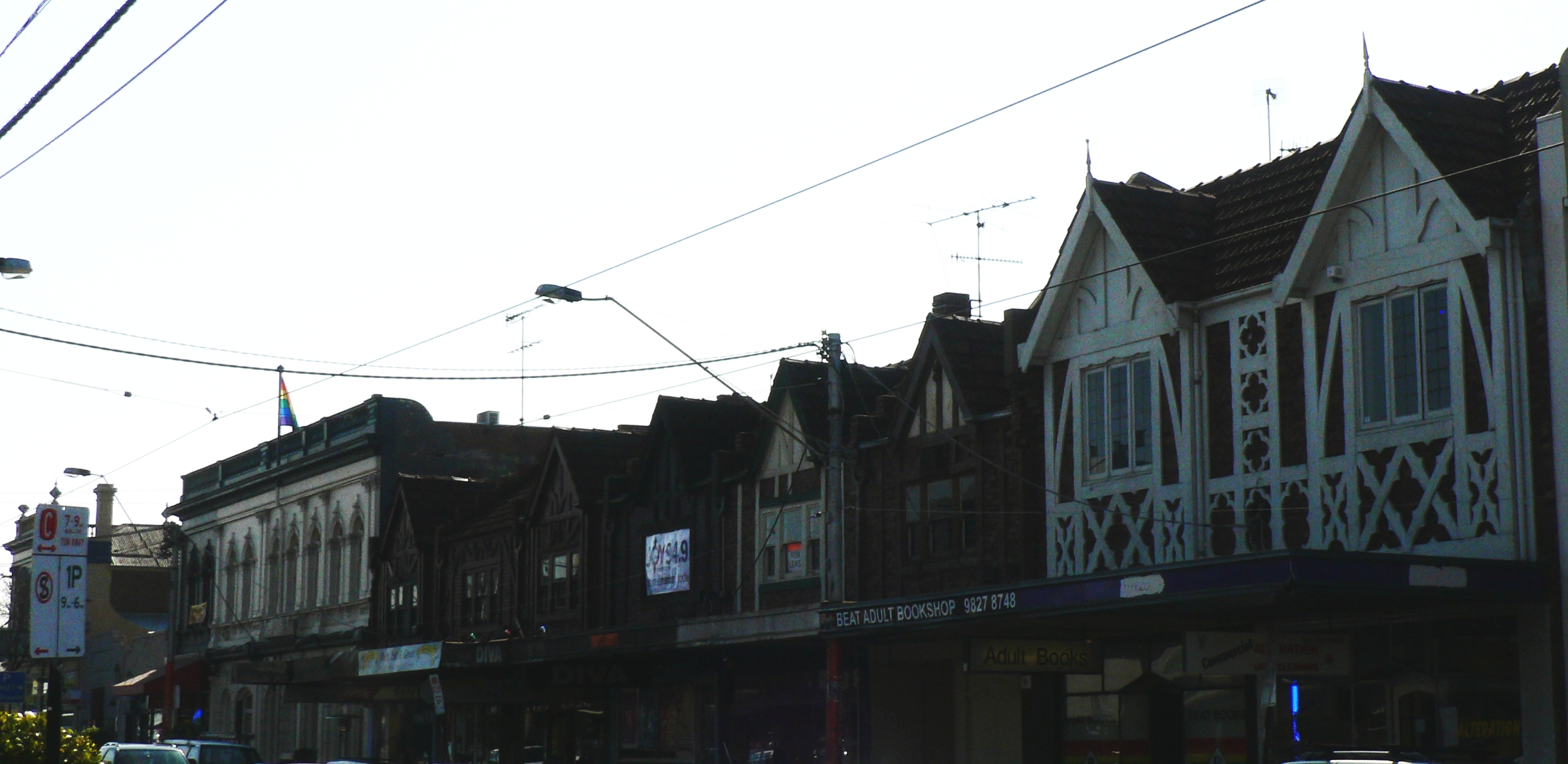
A mock Tudor row on Commercial Road, South Yarra

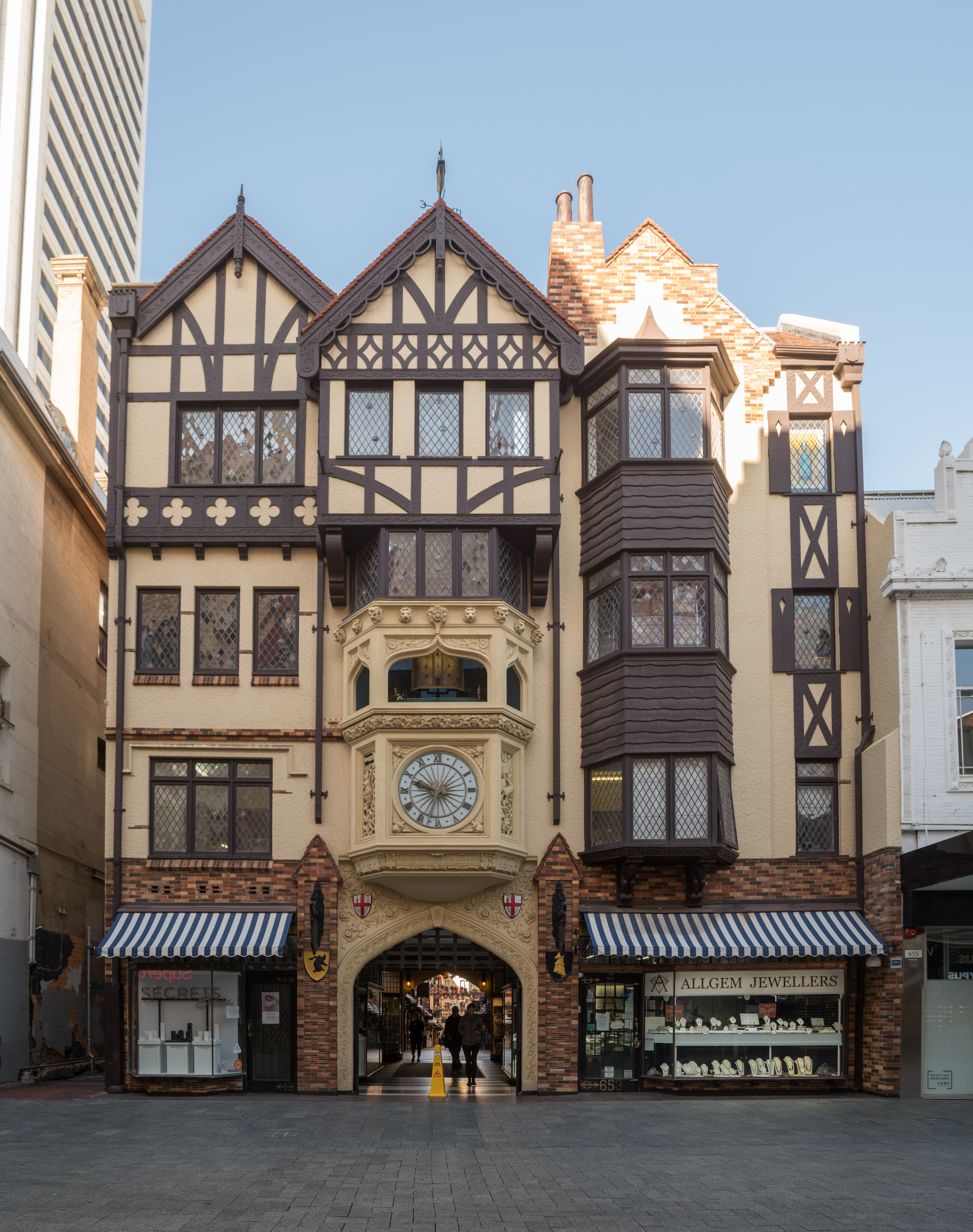
London Court shopping complex in Perth. Built 1937.

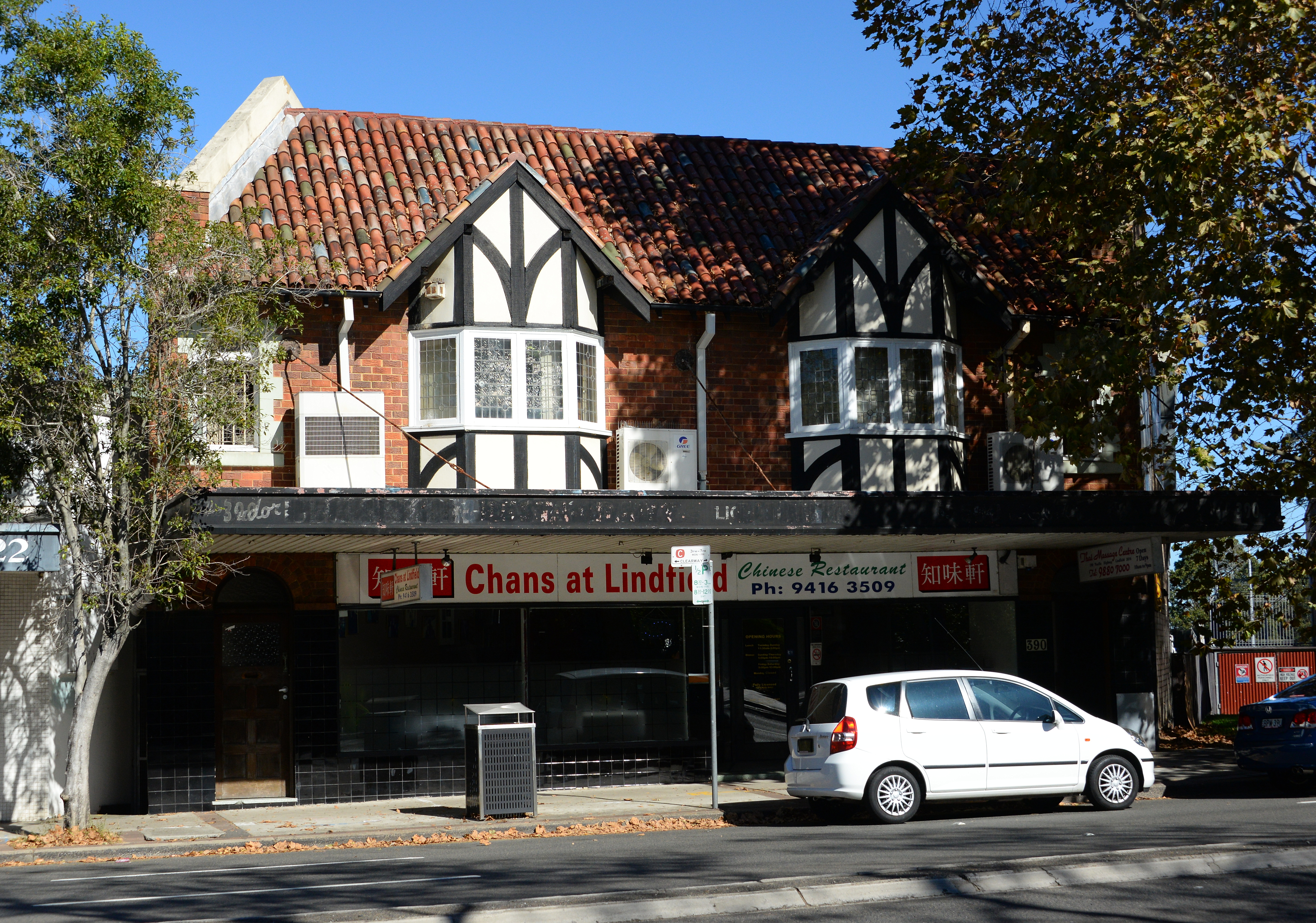
Old English style shops, Lindfield.

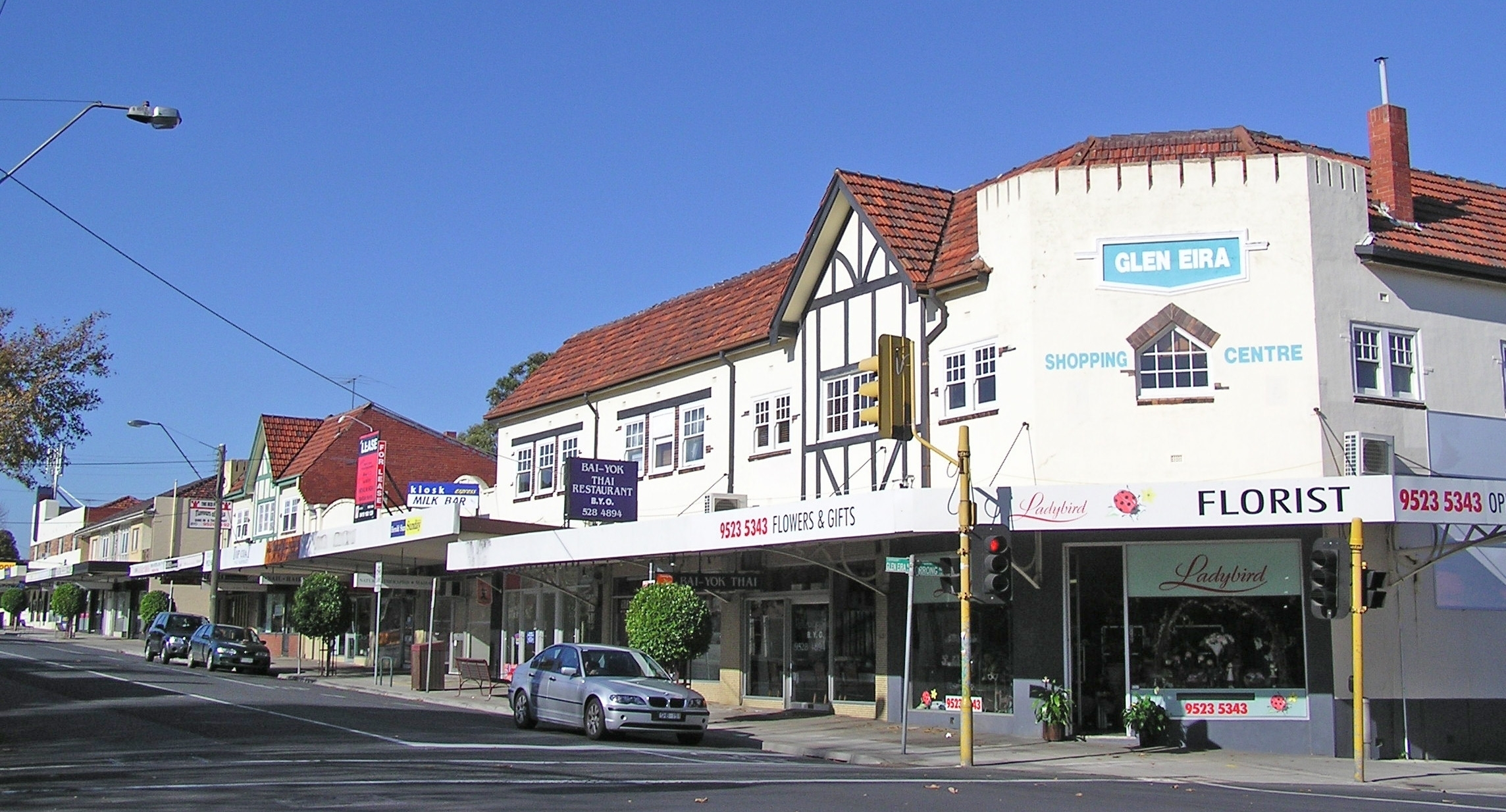
Old English shops, Elsternwick, Melbourne.

=== Inter-War Functionalist & Moderne ===
The functionalist and moderne style often used combinations of blonde and brown bricks in linear vertical or horizontal patterns. Notable examples include: Museum of Contemporary Art (Sydney); Captain's Flat Hotel (NSW); Russell Street Police Headquarters (Melbourne); Astor Theatre (St Kilda, Victoria); Ballarat Law Courts (Ballarat);

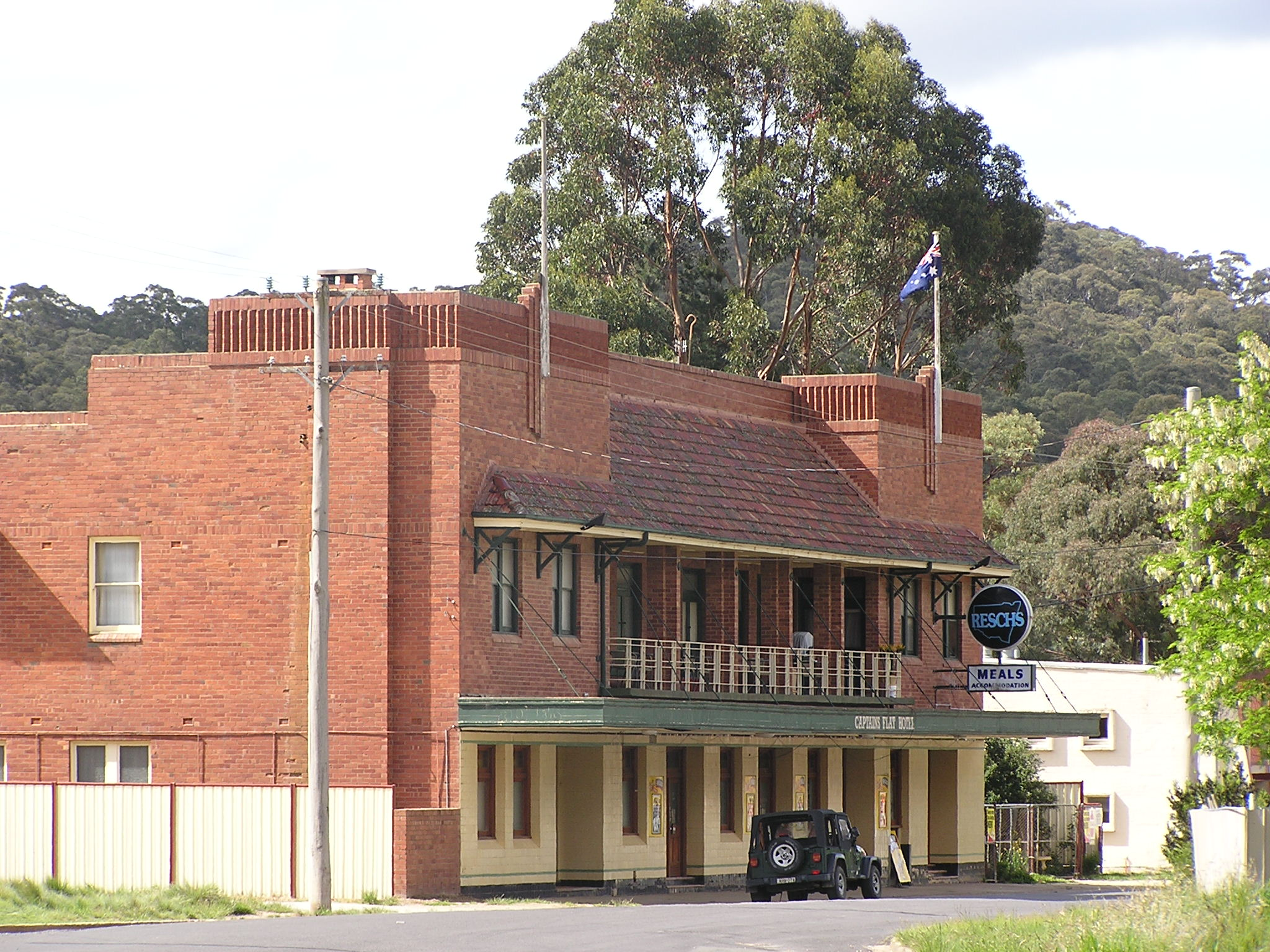
Hotel at Captains Flat built 1938; Functionalist

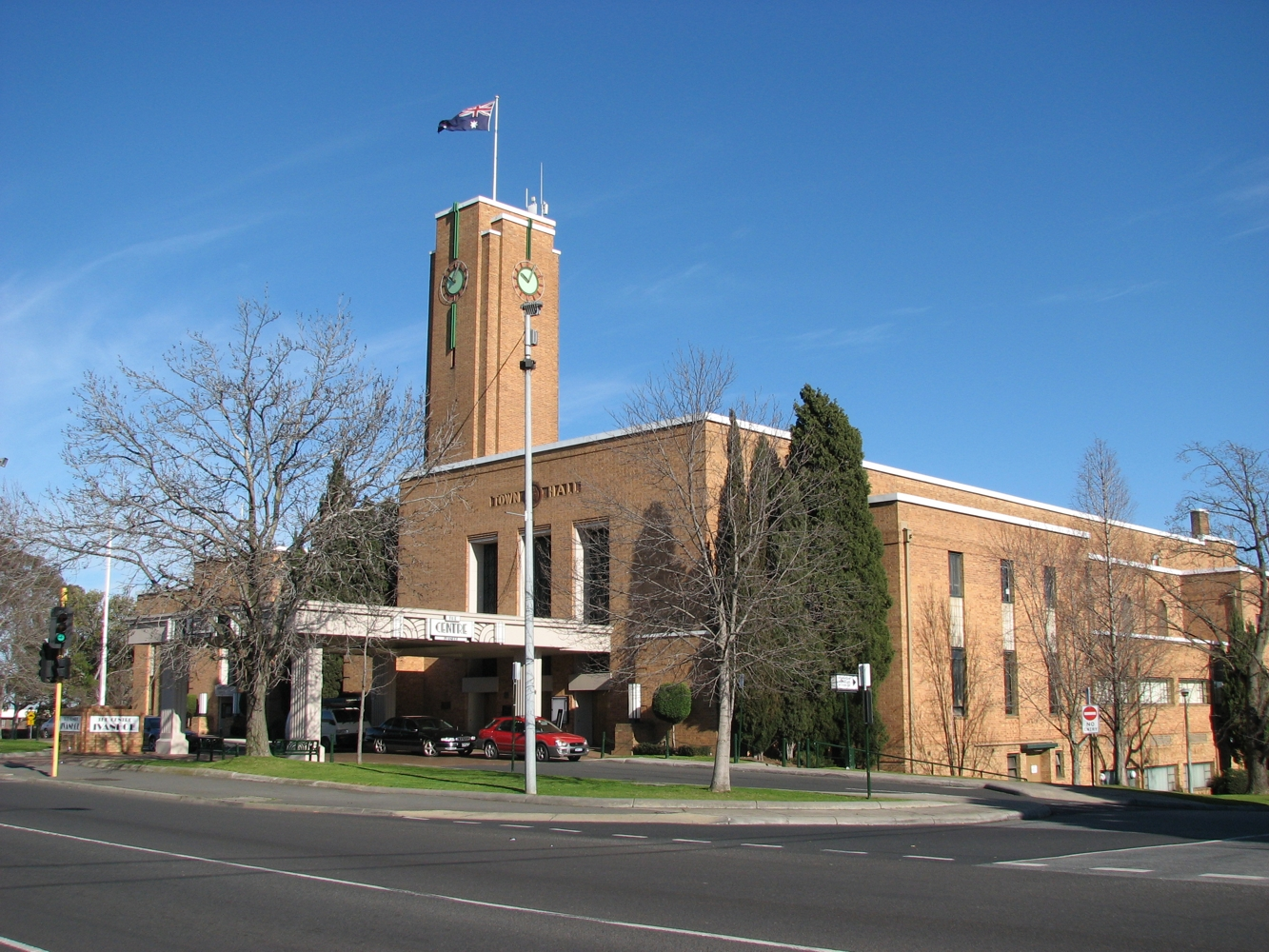
Heidelberg Town Hall, Heidelberg, Victoria; built 1937; a fine example of interwar brick moderne

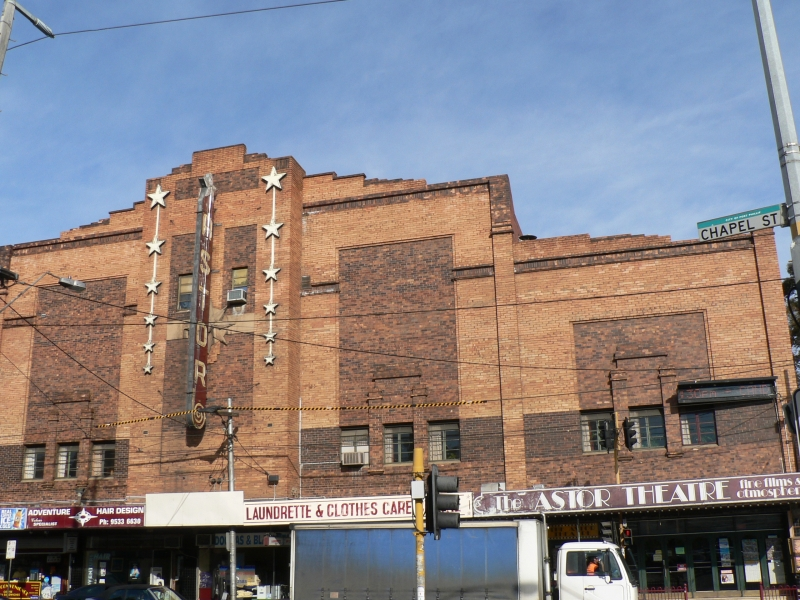
the Astor Theatre, St Kilda; built 1937

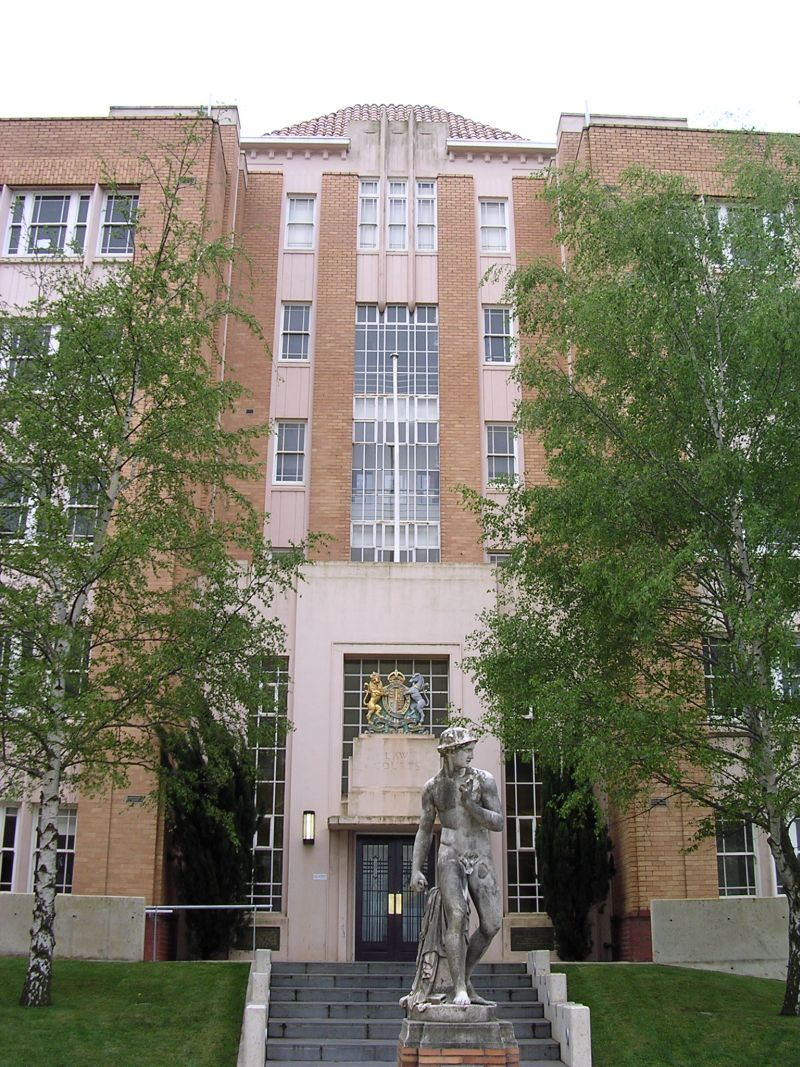
Law Courts, Ballarat

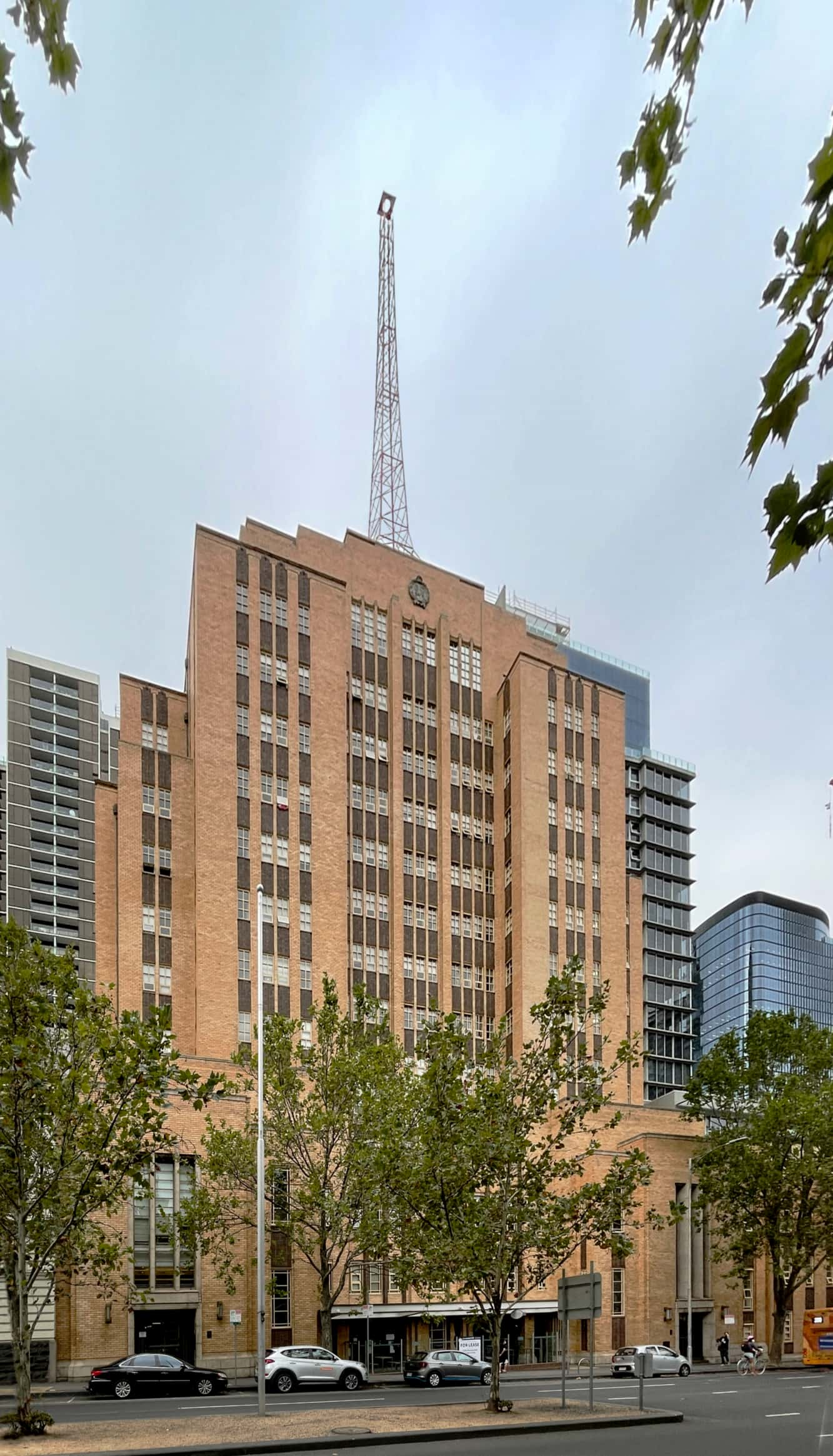
Former Police Headquarters, Russell Street, Melbourne; built 1940; an example of interwar brick moderne heavily influenced by North American skyscrapers

== Post-War Period (c. 1940–1960) ==
5 styles, each style name prefaced by "Post-War":

Ecclesiastical, International, Modern

=== Ecclesiastical ===
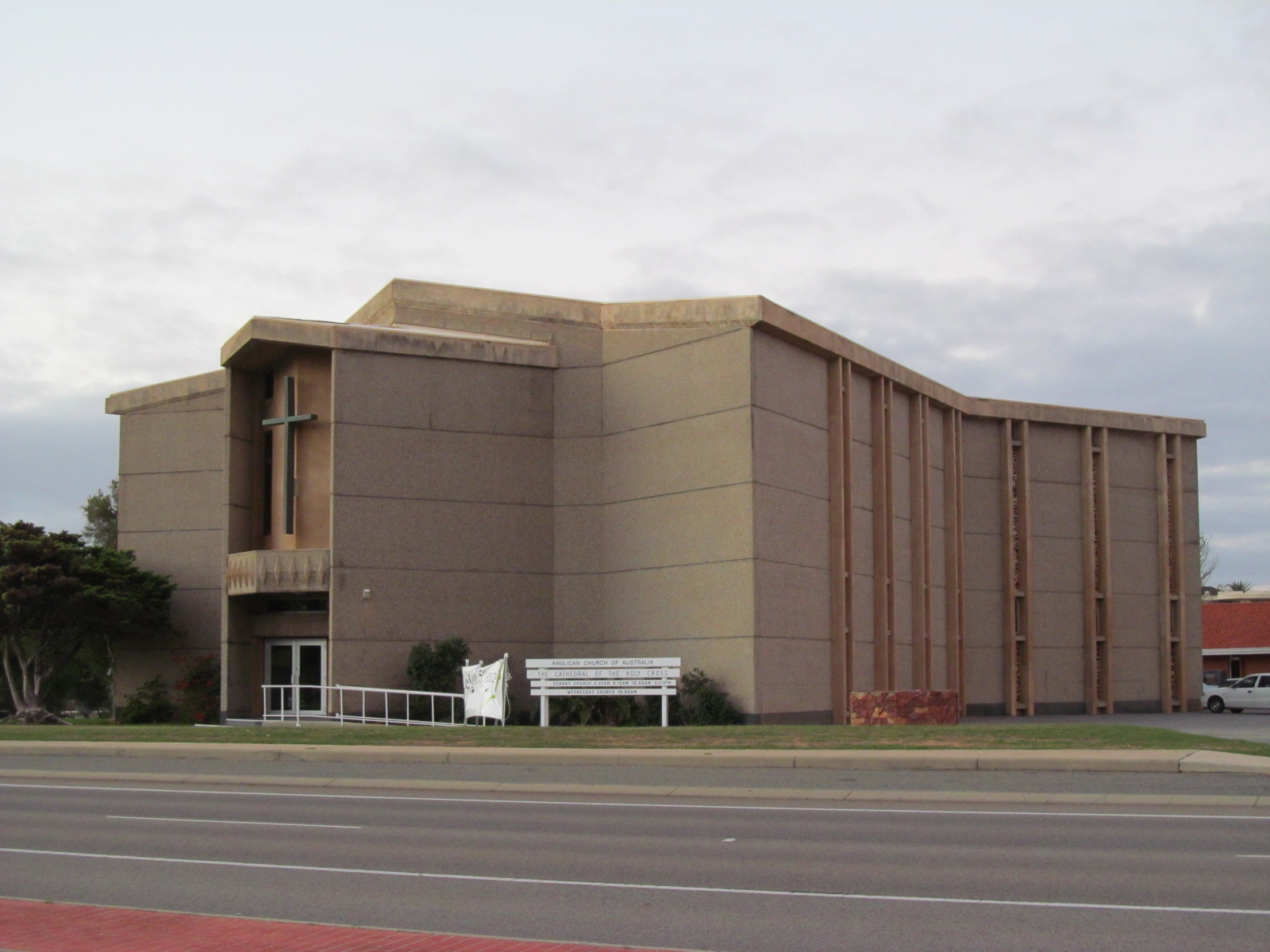
Cathedral of the Holy Cross, Geraldton. Completed 1964. Unorthodox star shaped plan.

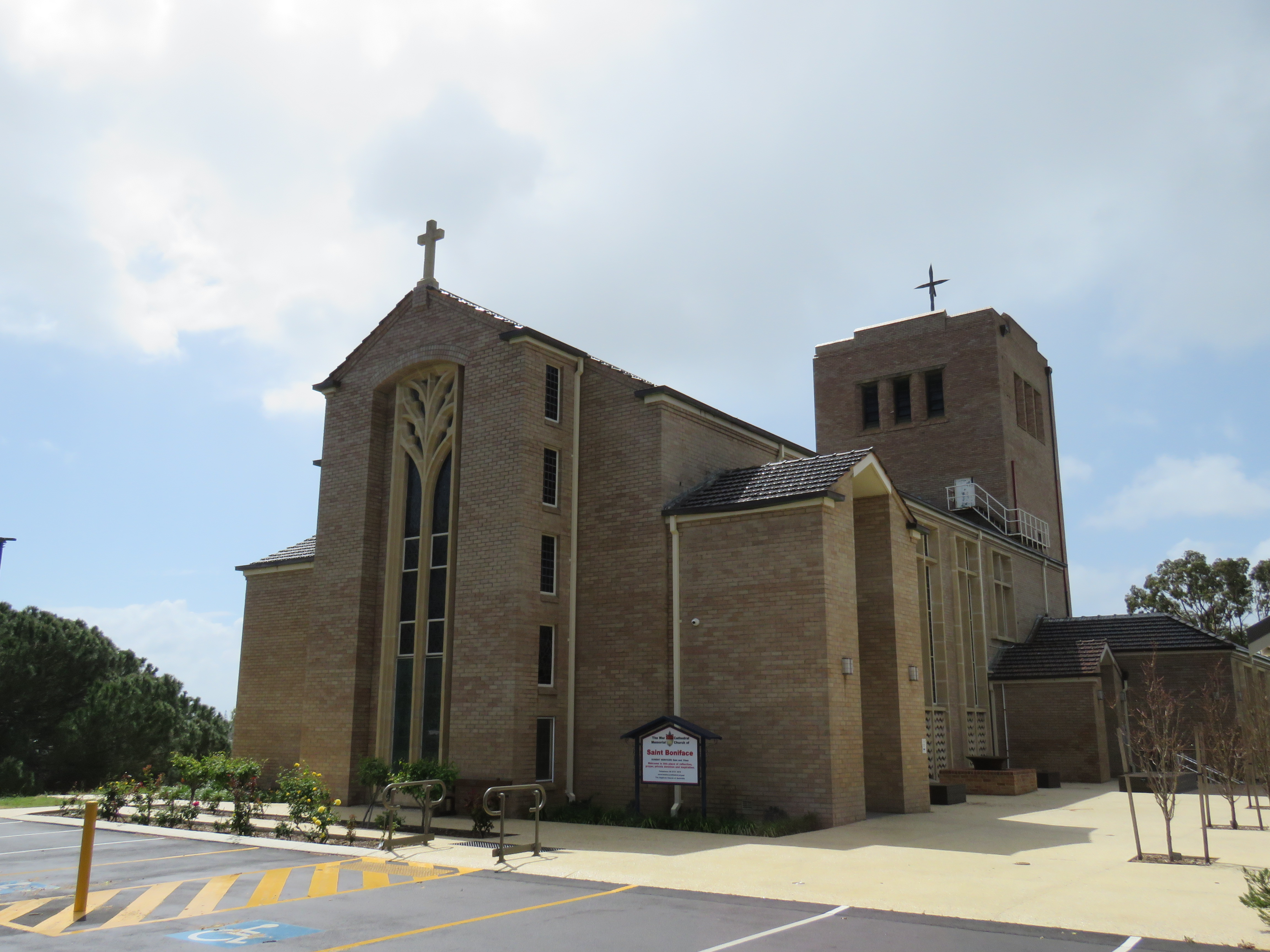
St Boniface Anglican Cathedral, Bunbury. Completed 1962. Traditional cruciform plan.

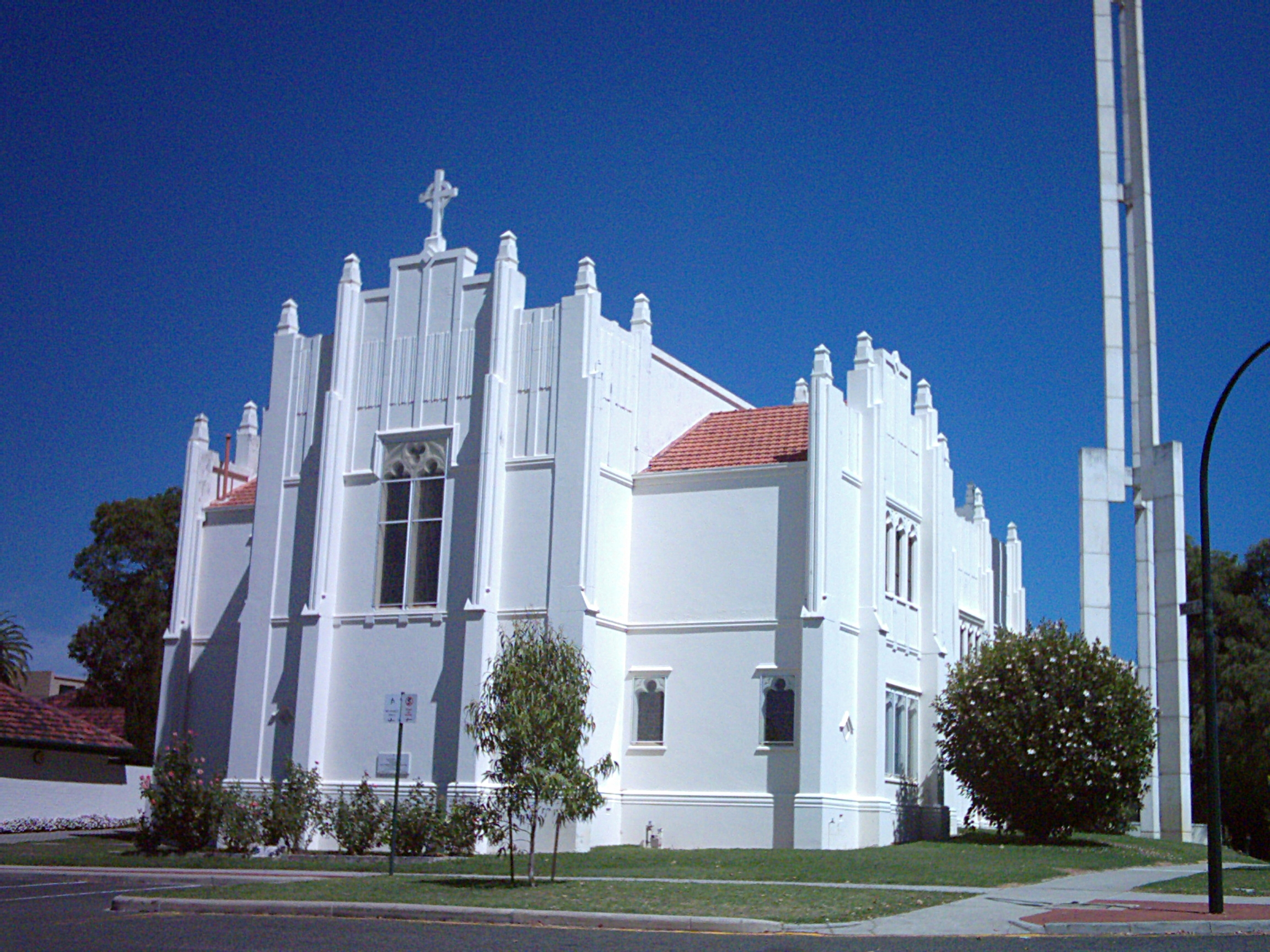
St Marys Anglican Church, South Perth built 1957

=== International Style ===
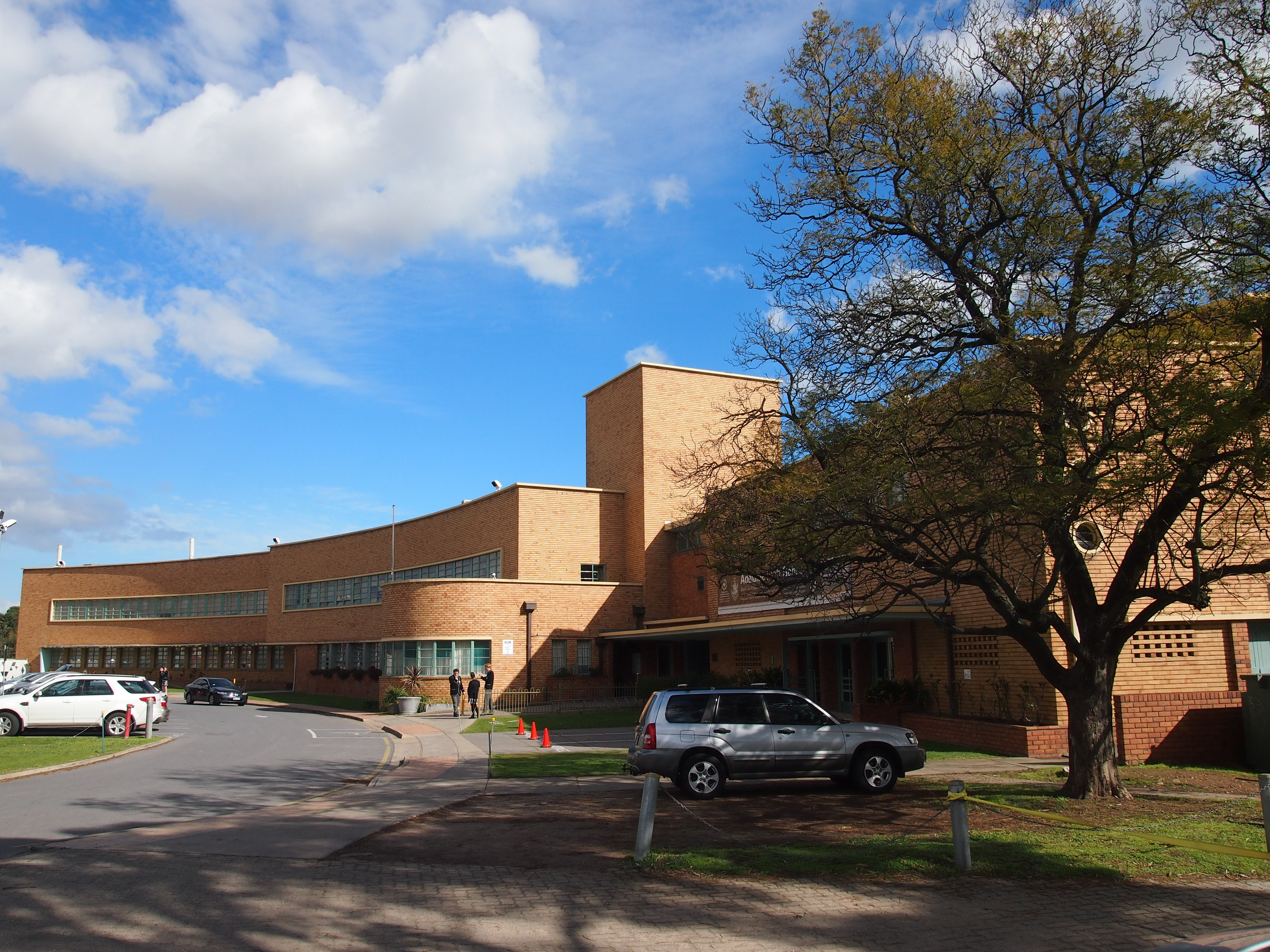
Adelaide High School, West Terrace, Adelaide; completed 1951

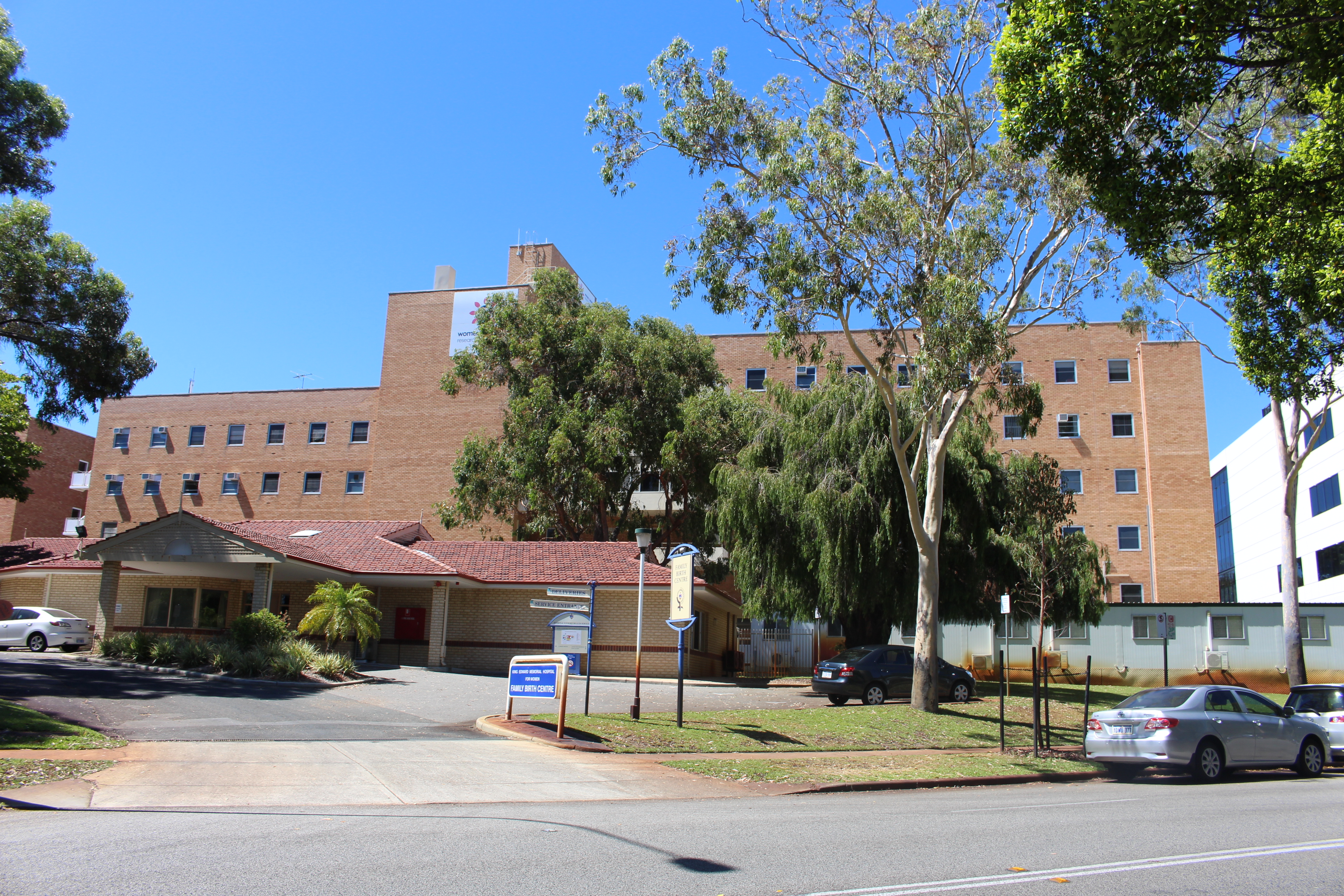
Agnes Walsh Nurses Home, King Edward Memorial Hospital for Women, Subiaco, Western Australia; c. 1952

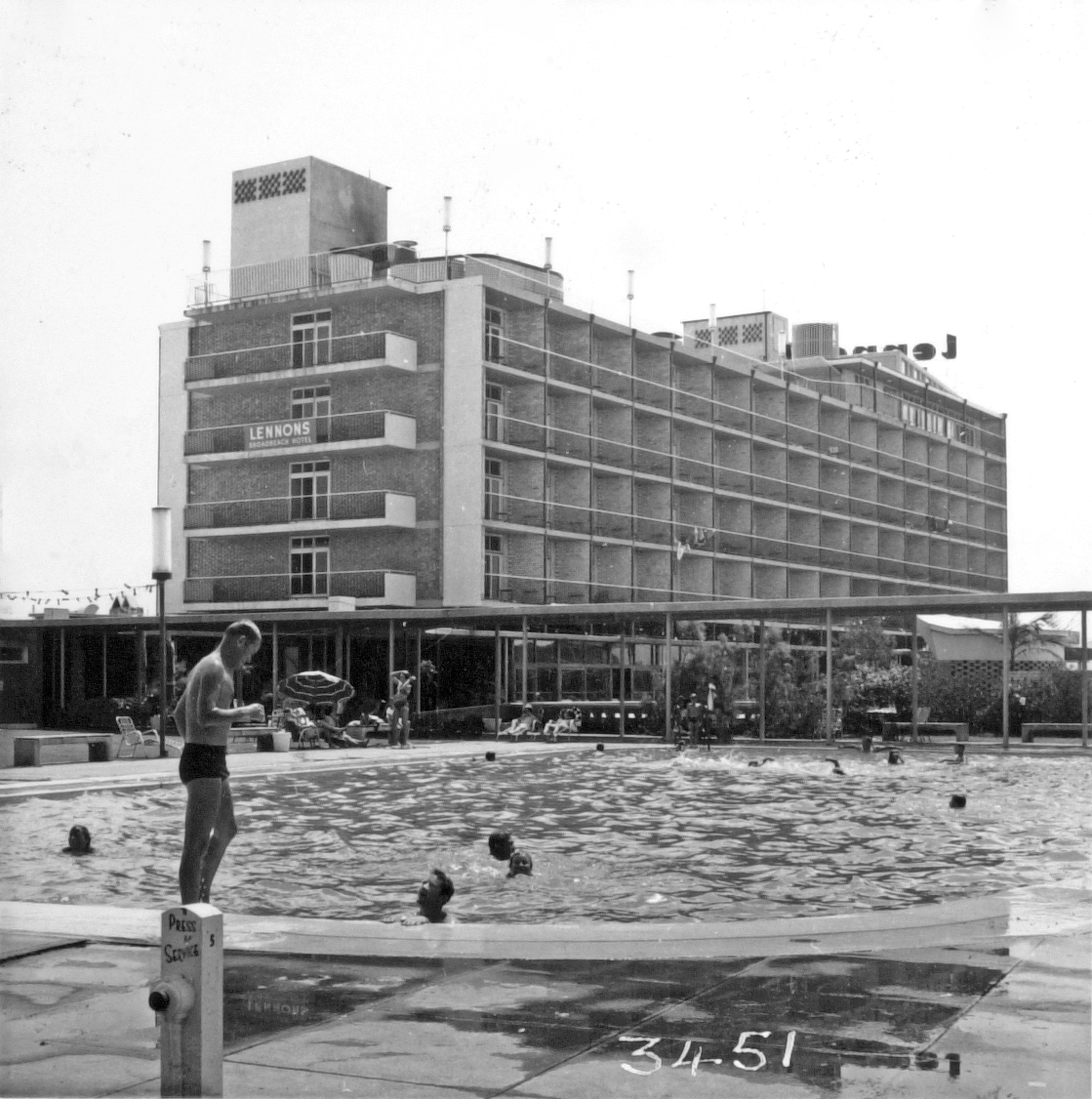
Lennon's Hotel, Broadbeach; completed 1957

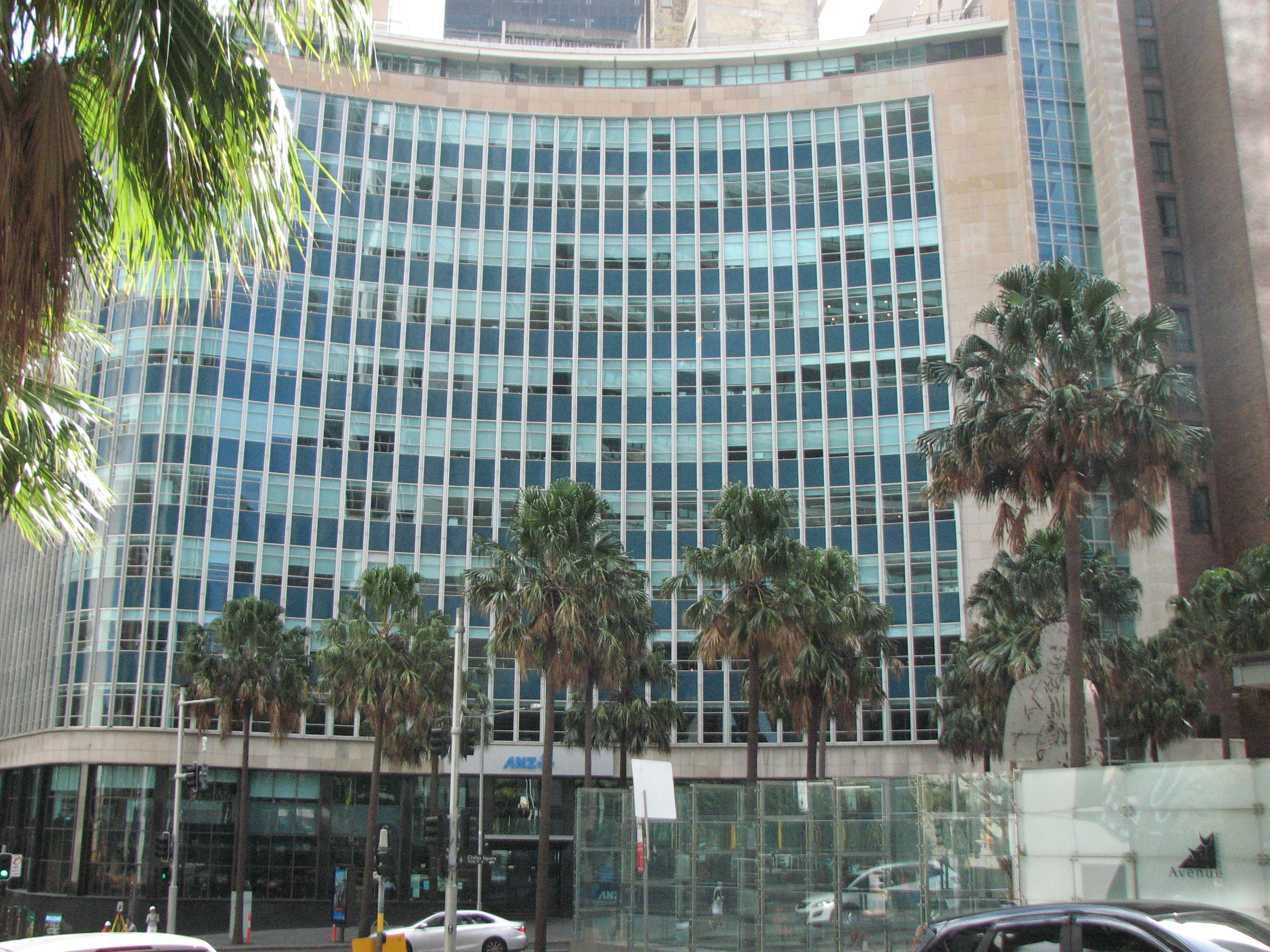
Qantas House, Sydney; built from 1955-1957, designed by Rudder, Littlemore & Rudder

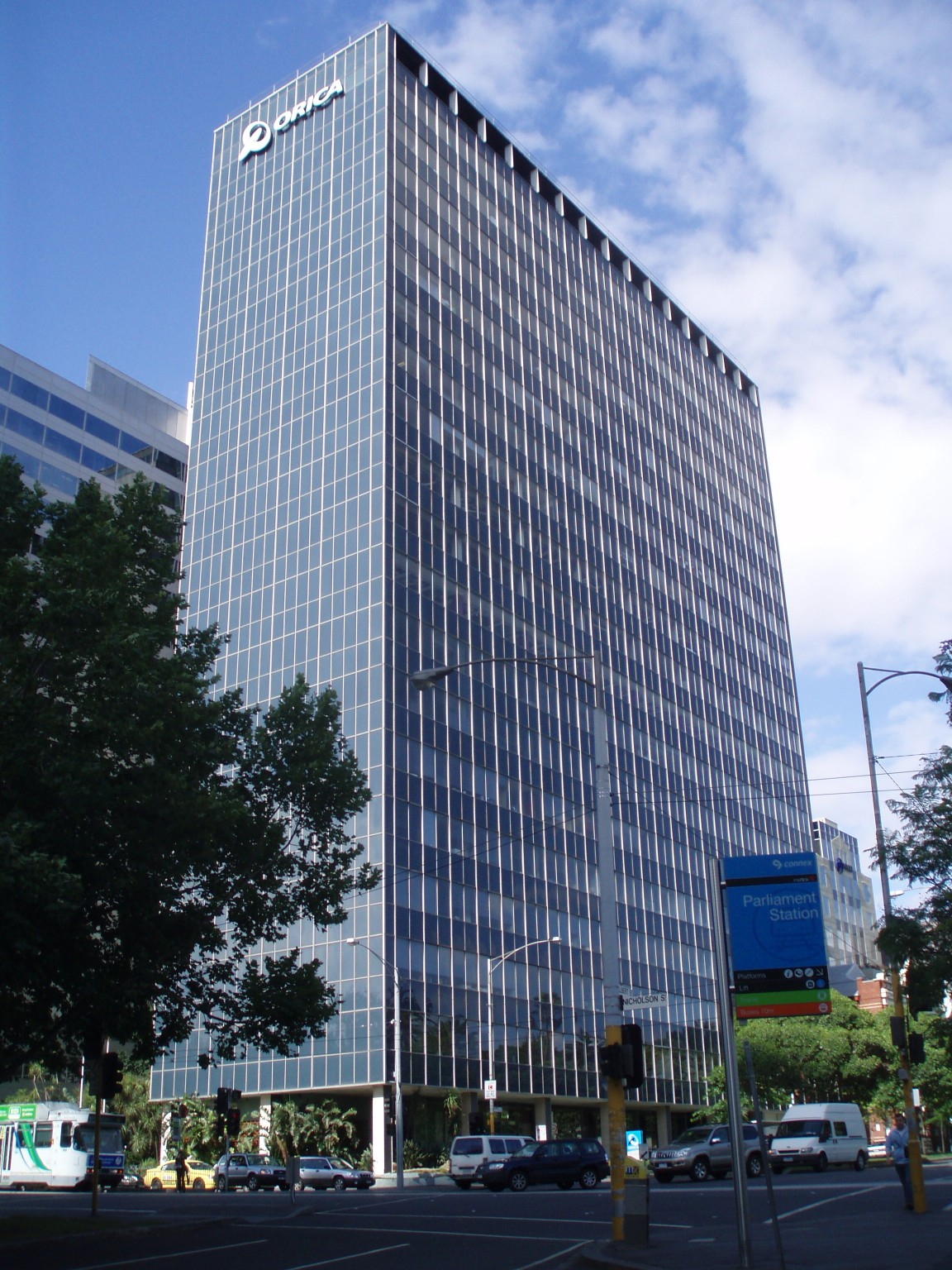
Orica House, East Melbourne; completed 1958, early curtain wall glass building and tallest in Australia when completed.

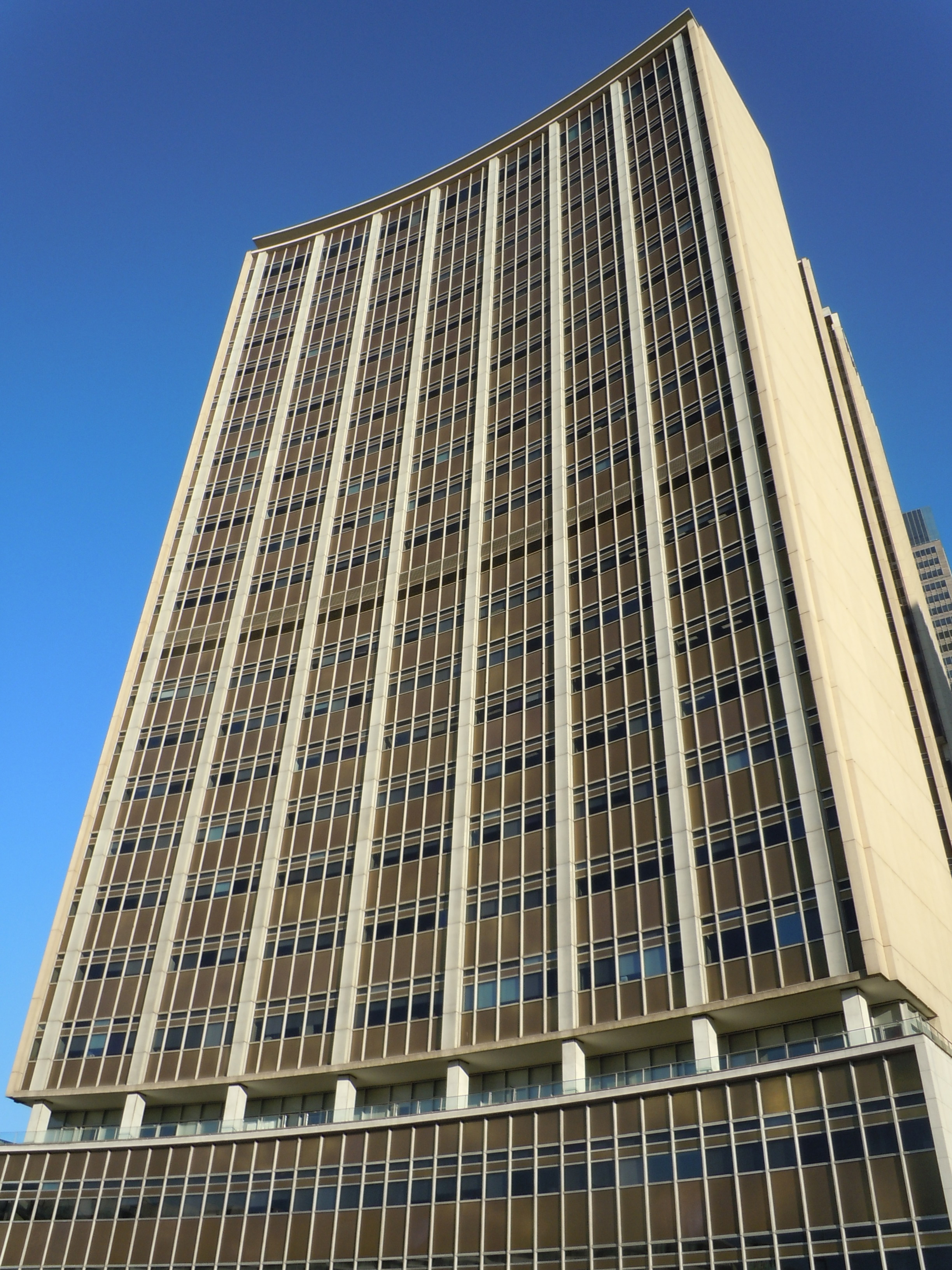
AMP Building, Sydney; built 1958-1952, designed by Peddle, Thorp and Walker architects

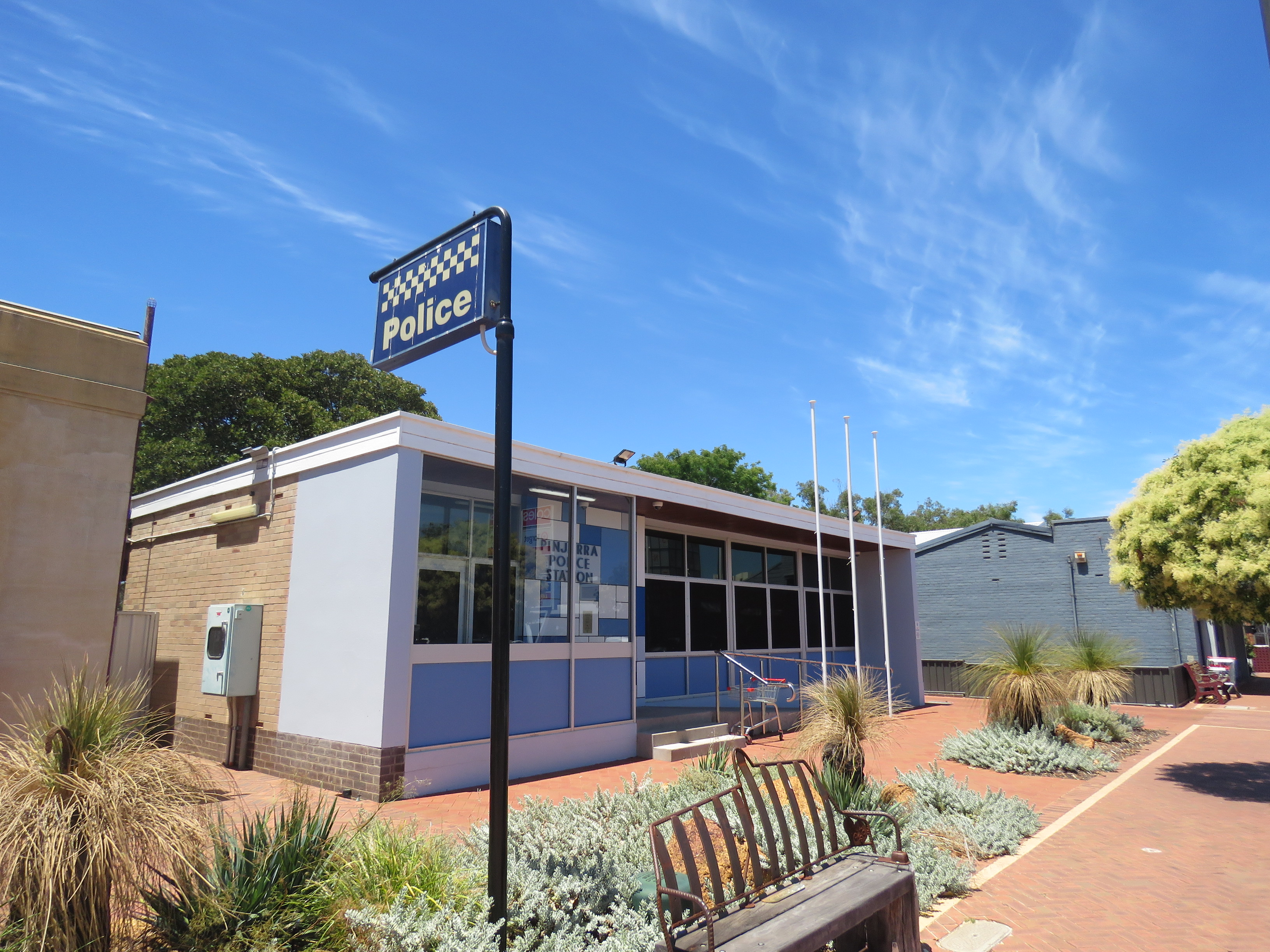
Pinjarra Police Station, Pinjarra; completed 1962

== Late Twentieth-Century Period 1960–2000 ==
14 styles, each style name prefaced by "Late Twentieth Century":

Stripped Classical, Ecclesiastical, International, Organic, Brutalist, Structuralist, Late Modern, Post Modern, Immigrants' Nostalgic

=== Stripped Classical ===
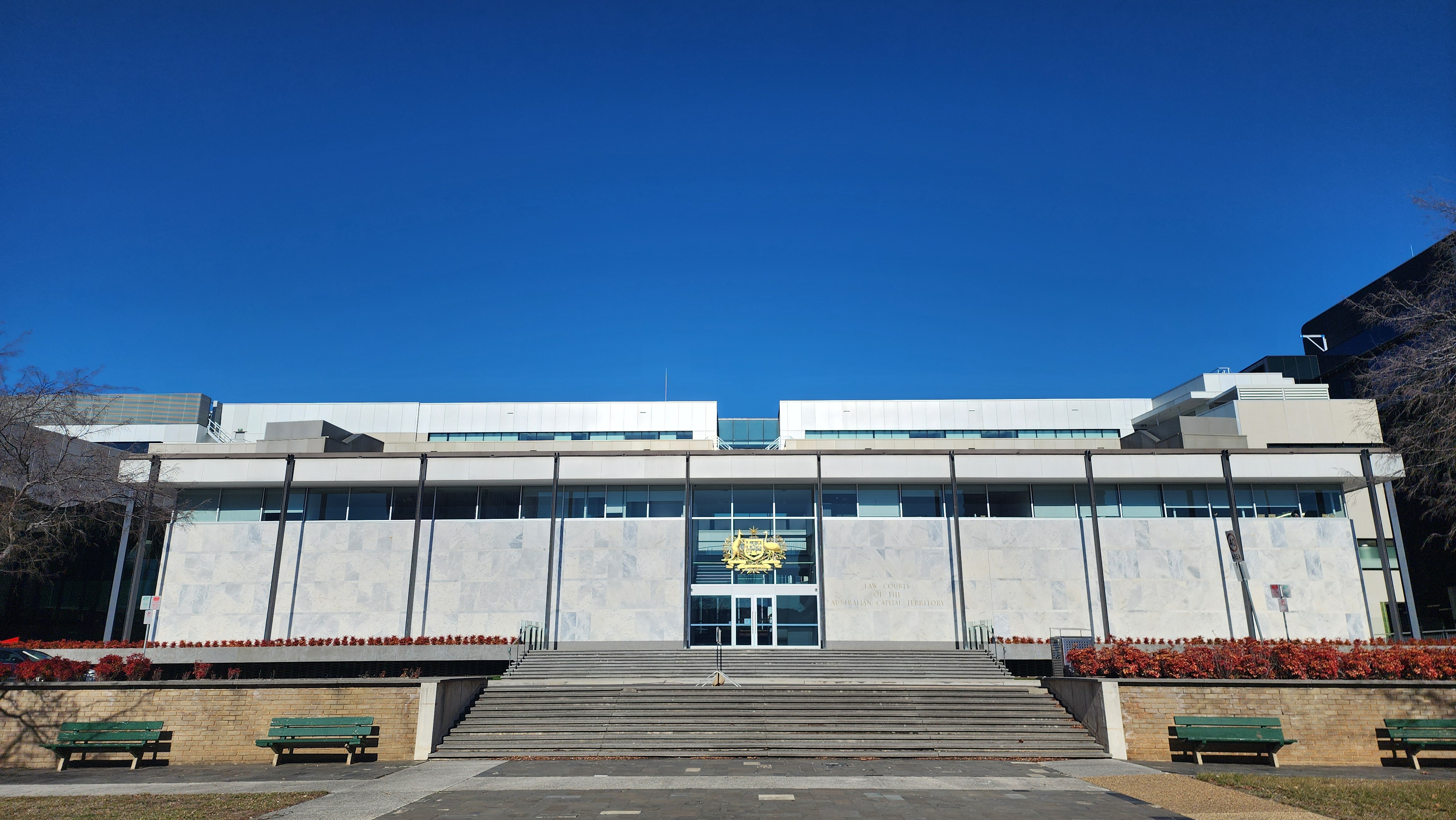
ACT Law Courts building, Canberra; c. 1961

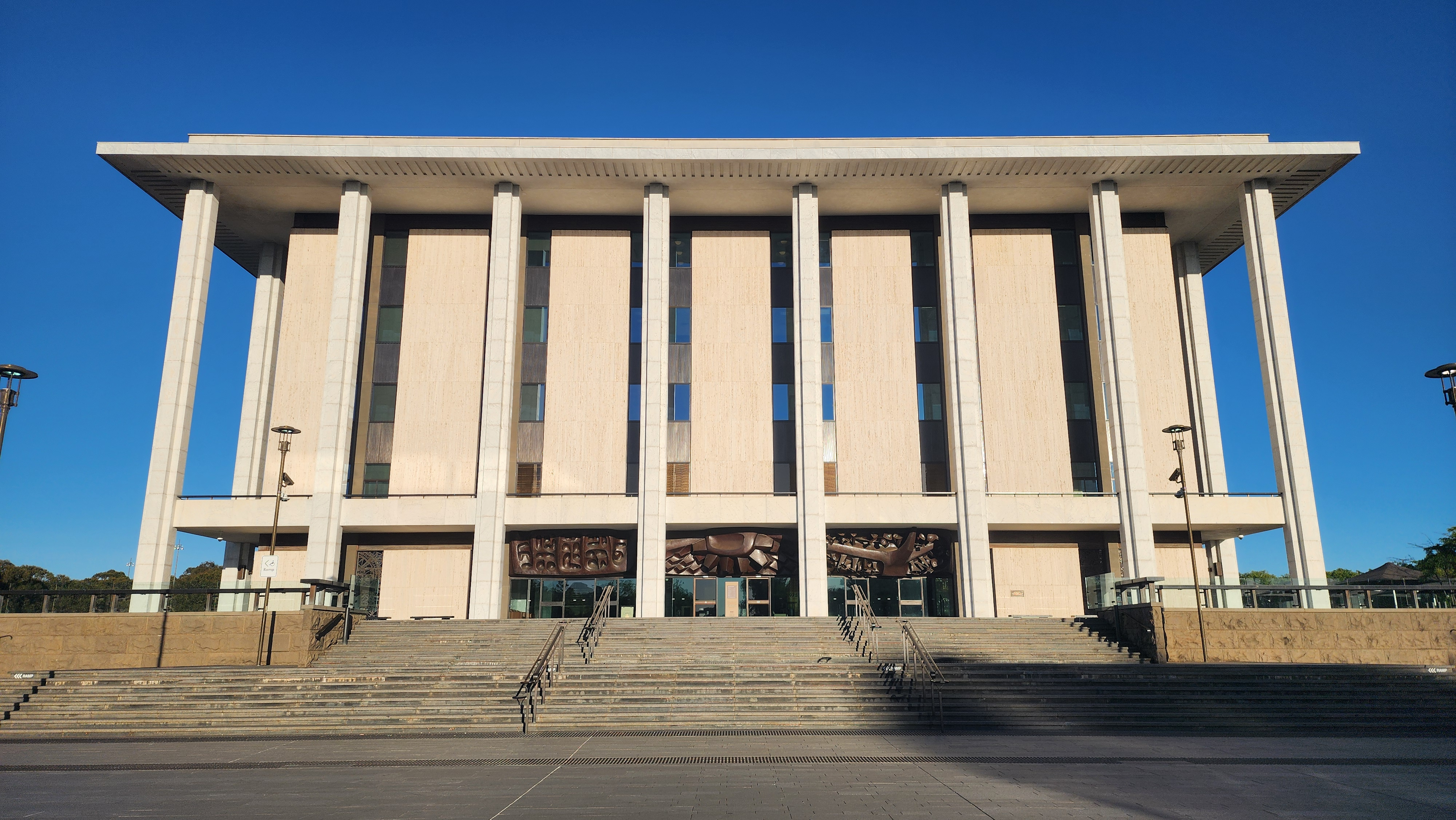
National Library of Australia, Canberra; completed 1964

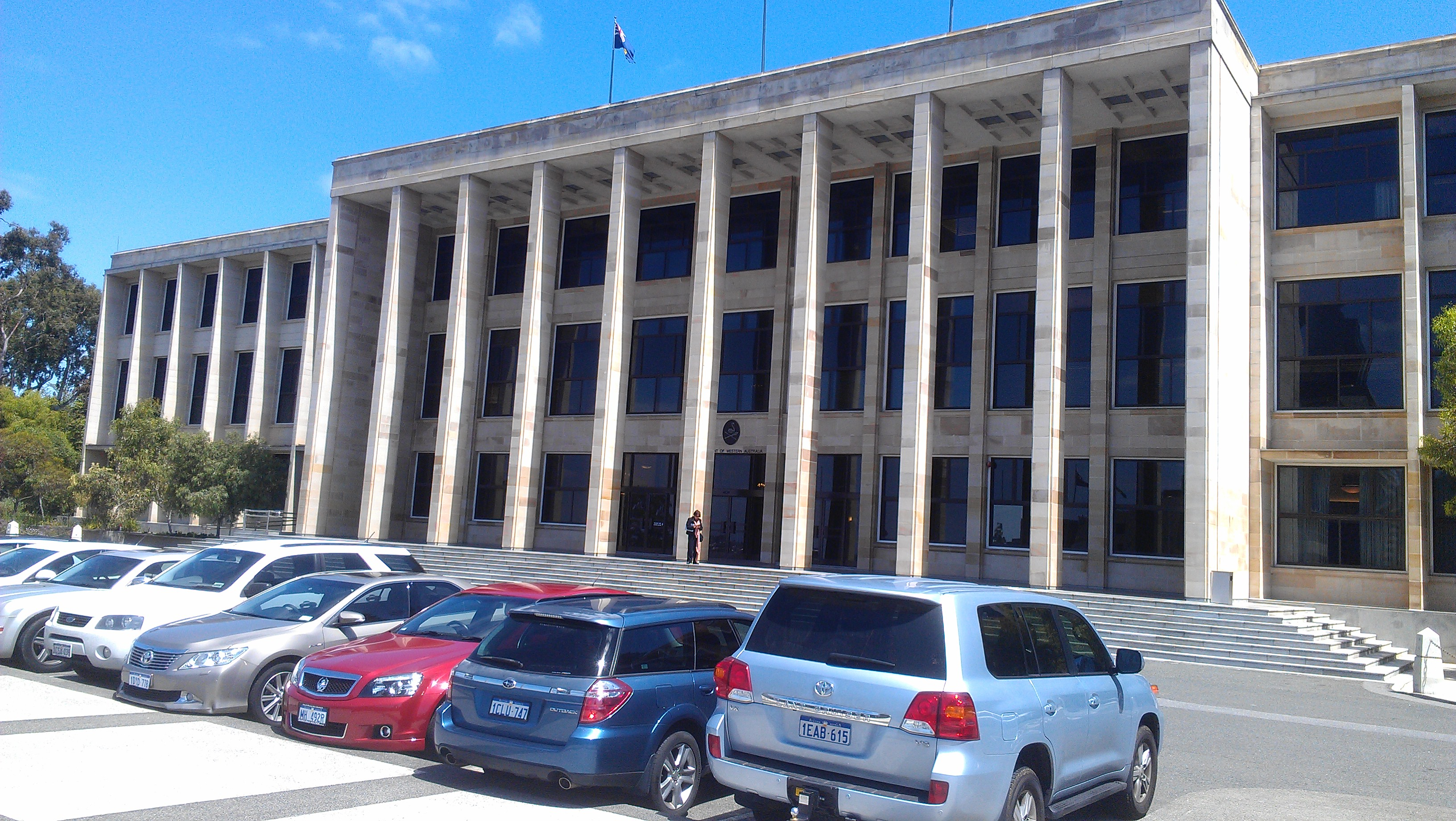
Parliament House – East Wing, Perth; completed 1964

Reid Library, University of Western Australia; from 1964

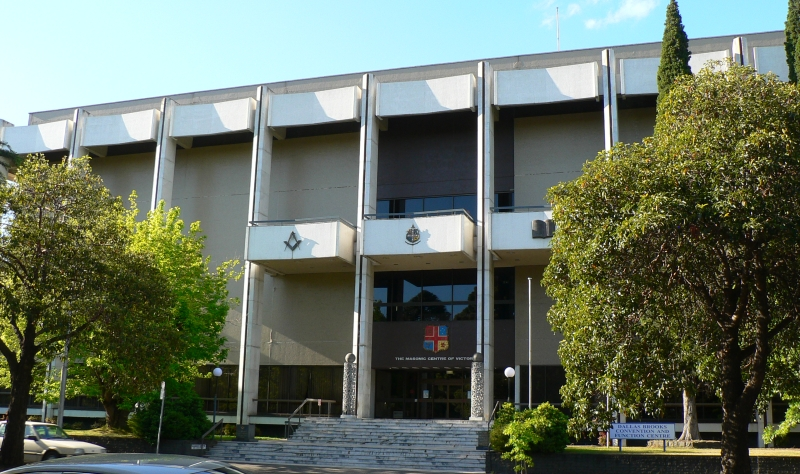
Dallas Brooks Hall, East Melbourne; completed 1969

=== Ecclesiastical ===
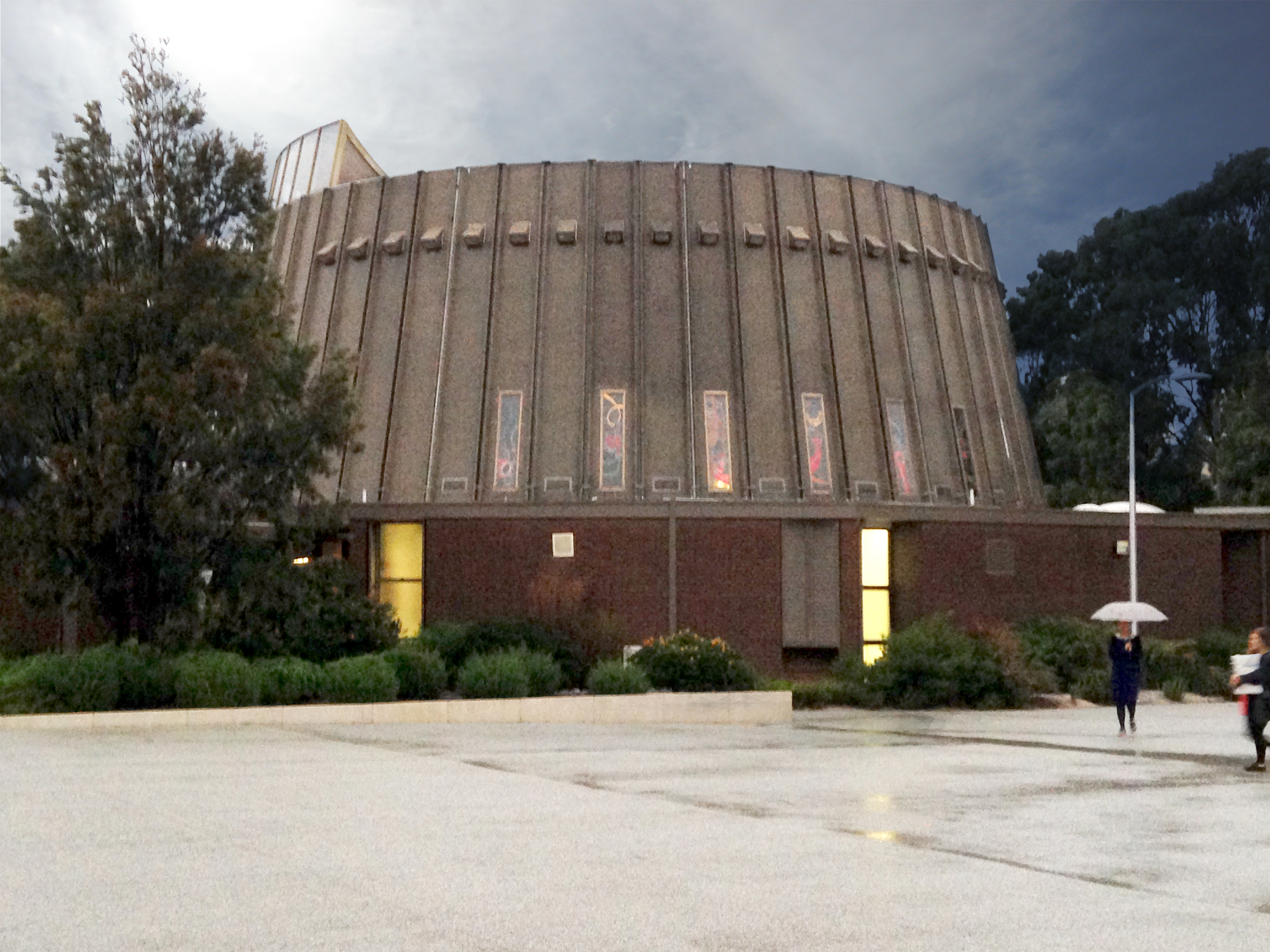
Religious Centre at Monash University, Clayton campus; completed 1968 in the structuralism form

=== International ===
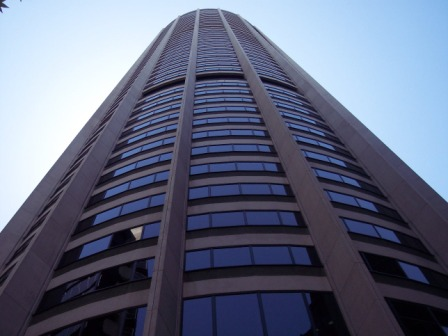
Australia Square, Sydney; completed 1967 as Australia's first true modern skyscraper

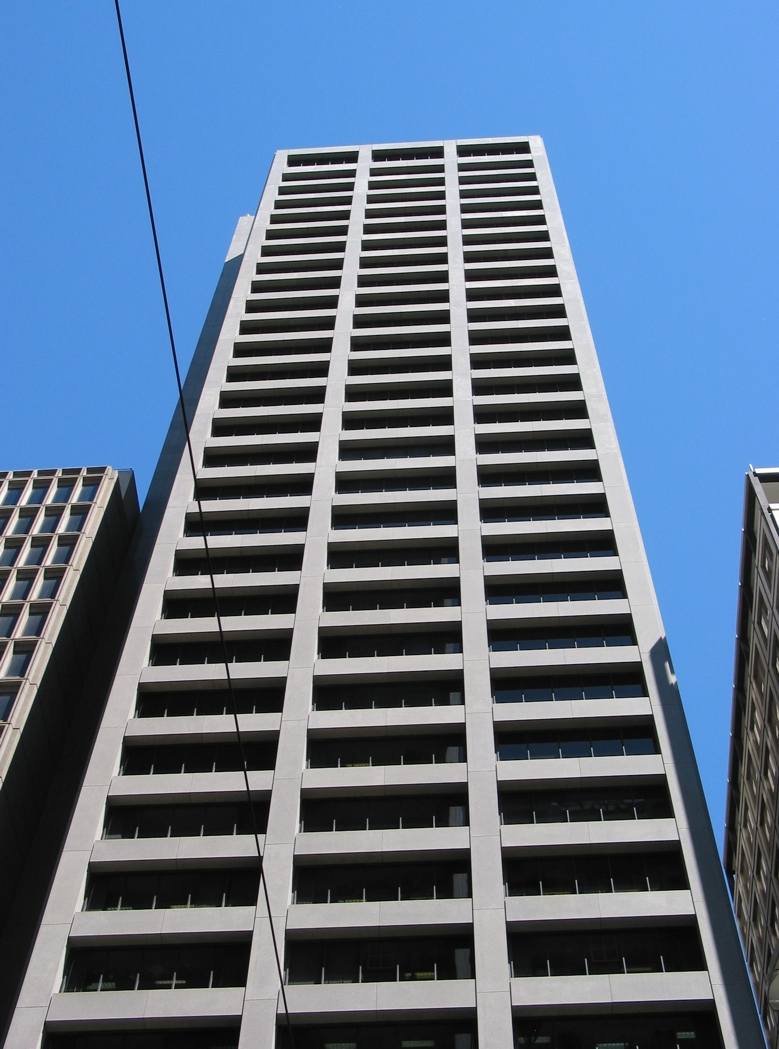
Optus Centre, Melbourne; completed 1975

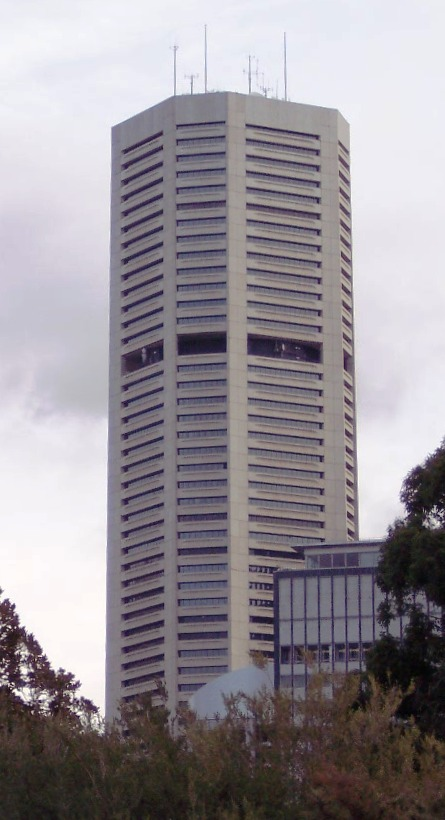
25 Martin Place, Sydney; completed 1977

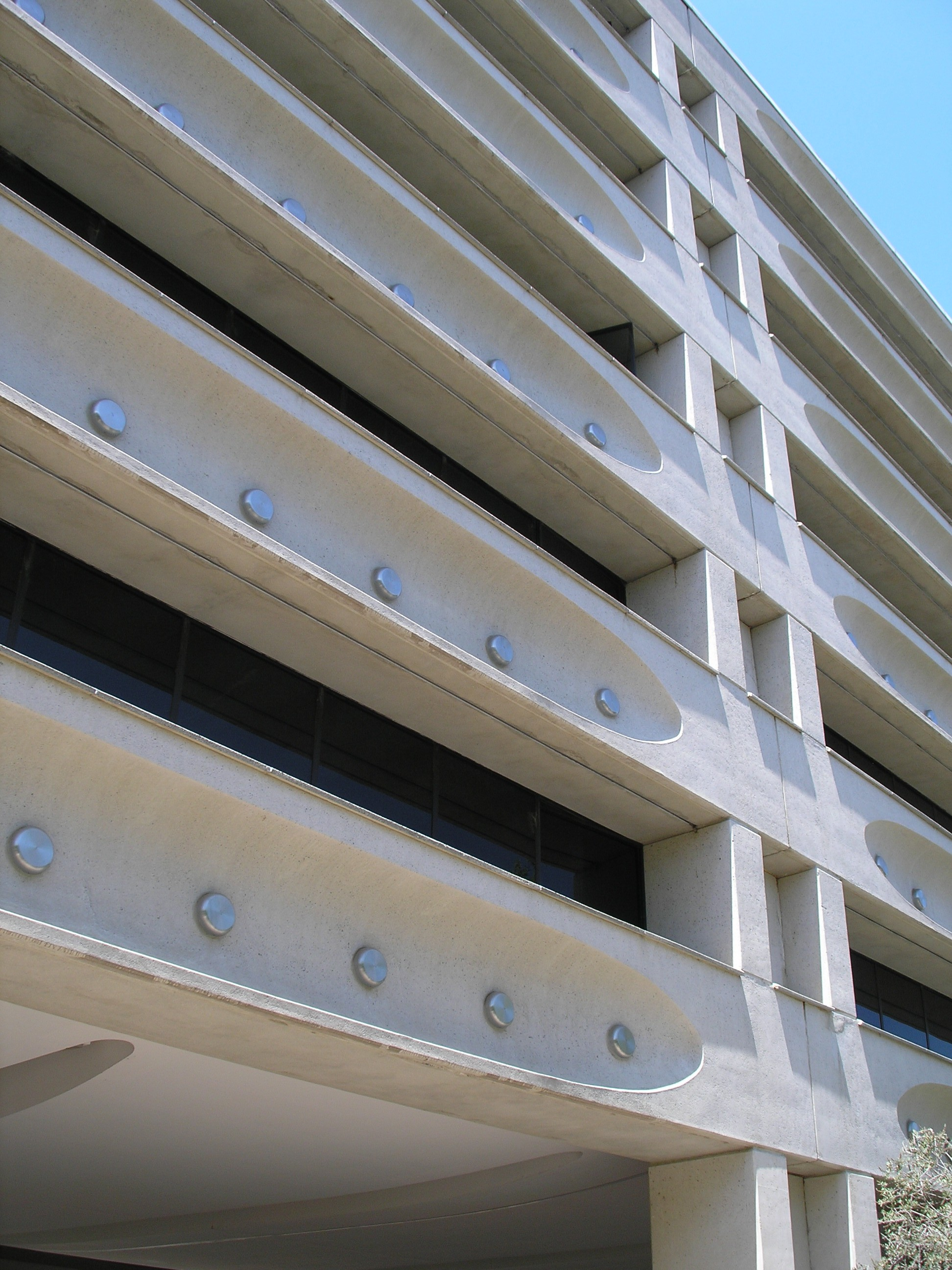
Edmund Barton Building, Canberra; completed 1974

=== Organic ===
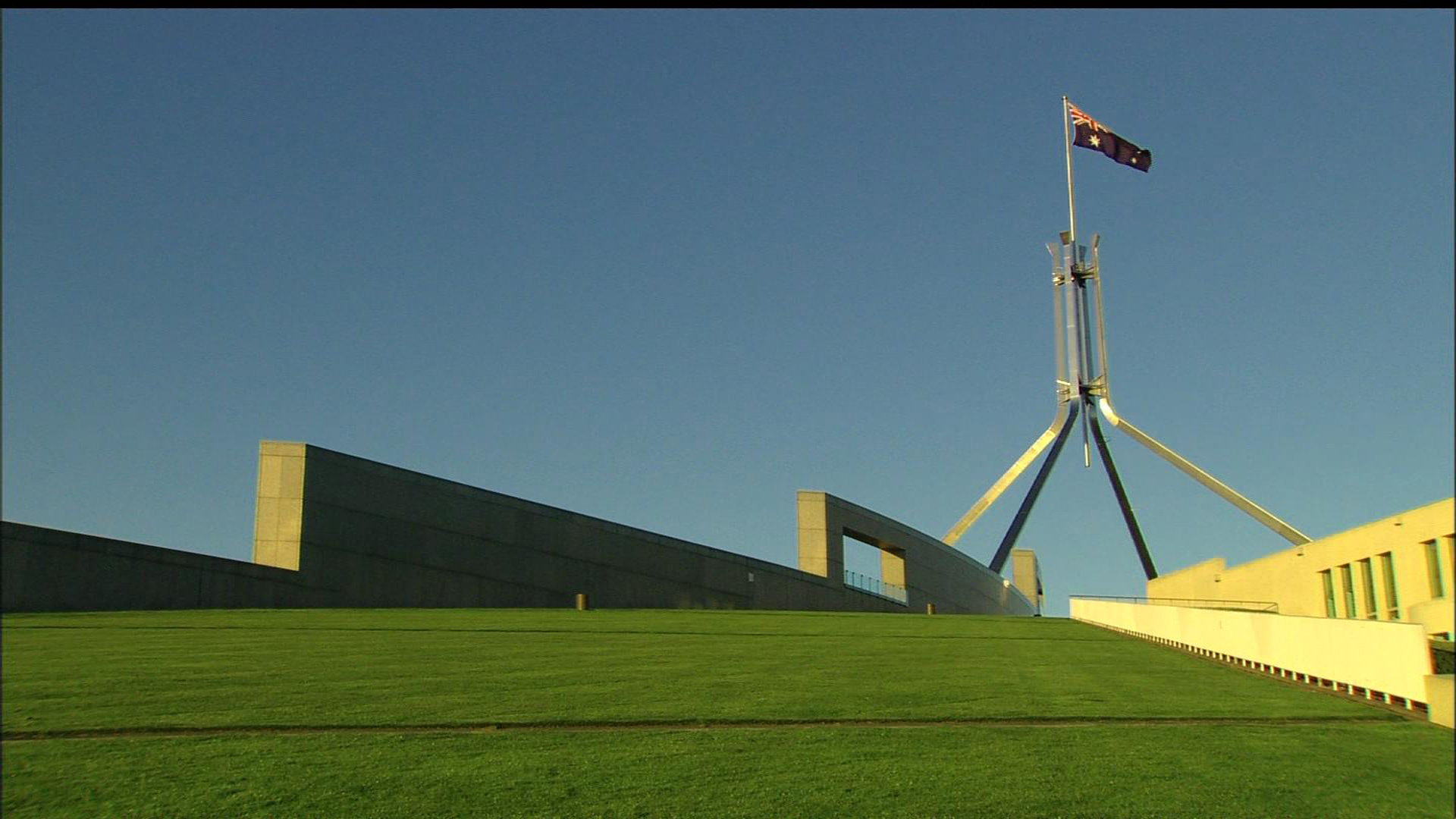
Parliament House, Canberra; completed 1988 as a mixture of Organic and contemporary Stripped Classical elements

=== Brutalist ===
Notable examples include: Sydney Masonic Centre/Civic Tower (Sydney); 259 George Street (Sydney); Sydney Law School (Sydney); Cameron Offices (Canberra); High Court of Australia (Canberra); State Library of Queensland (Brisbane); Queensland Performing Arts Centre (Brisbane); Law Courts (Brisbane); Suncorp Plaza (Brisbane); National Gallery of Victoria (Melbourne); Total carpark (Melbourne); WTC Wharf; Harold Holt Memorial Swimming Centre (Malvern, Victoria); St Kilda Public Library (St Kilda, Victoria); Plumbing Trades Employees Union of Australia Building (Melbourne); University of Melbourne Faculty of Engineering (Melbourne); Metropolitan Fire Brigade (East Melbourne, Victoria); R.A.W. Woodgate Centre (Kew, Victoria); Olivetti Building (Sydney); UTS Tower (University of Technology, Sydney); St Anthony's Church (Marsfield, Sydney). See Category:Brutalist architecture in Australia.

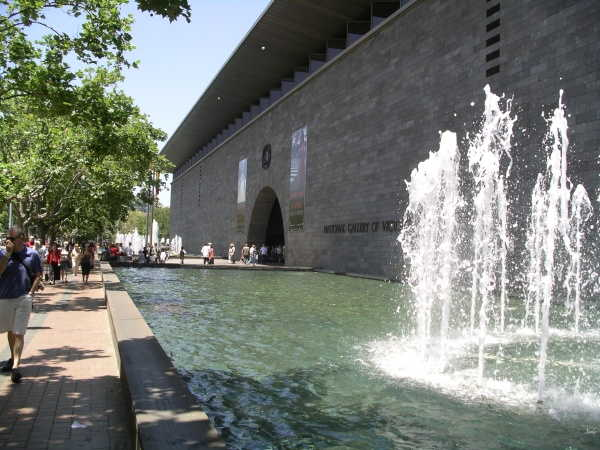
National Gallery of Victoria, St Kilda Road, Melbourne; completed 1962

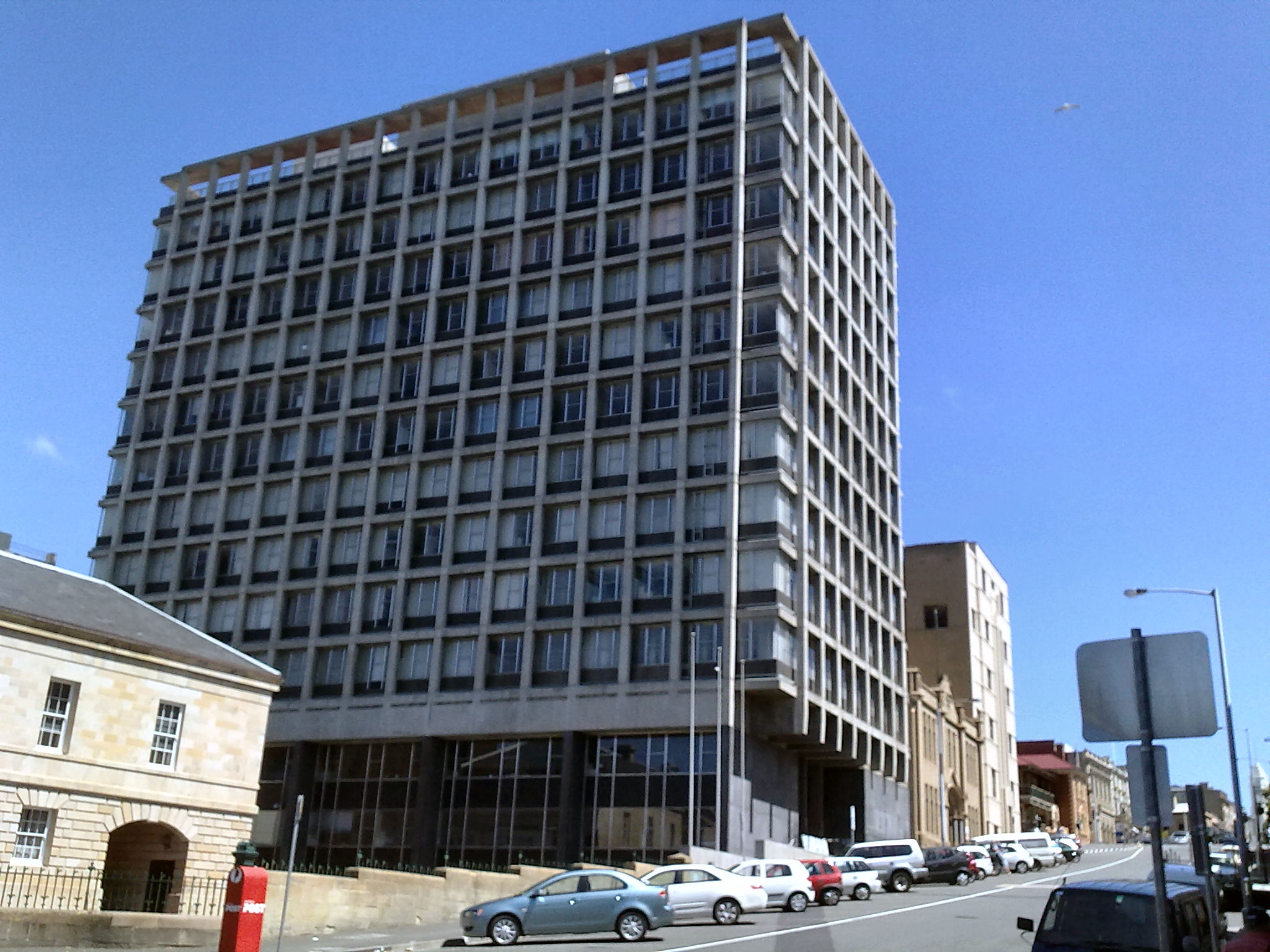
10 Murray Street, Hobart; completed 1969

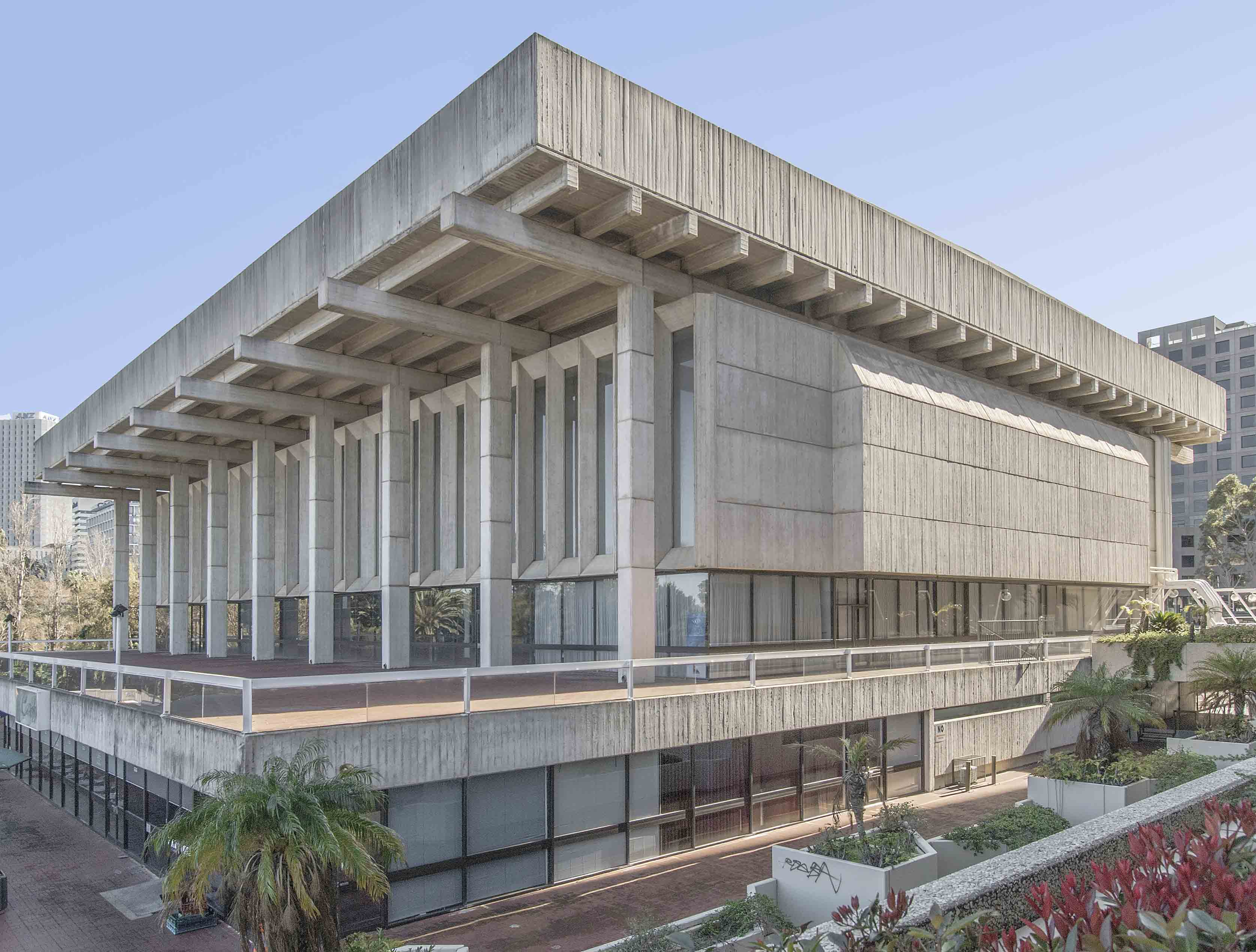
Perth Concert Hall; completed 1973

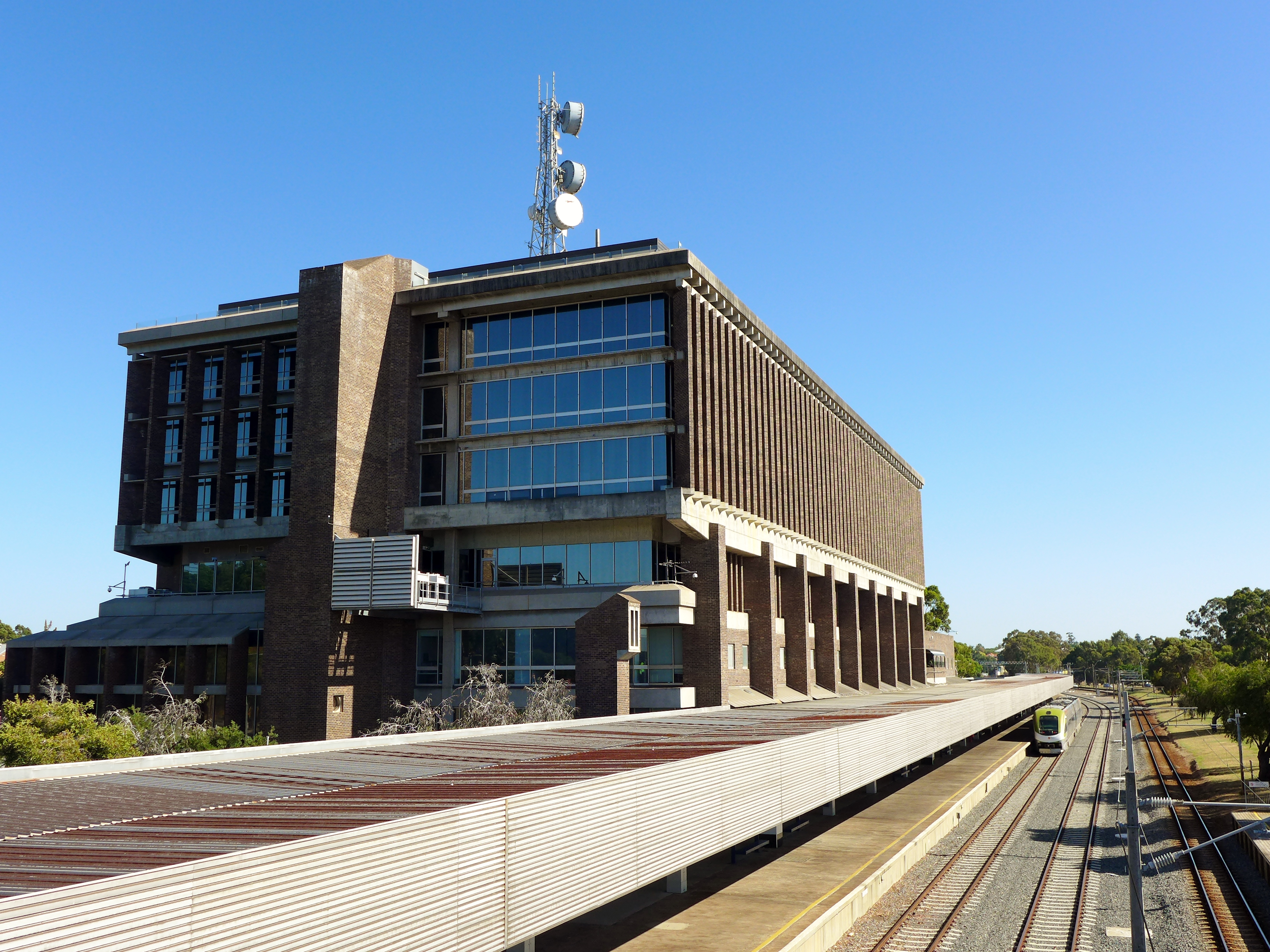
Public Transport Centre, Perth; completed 1976

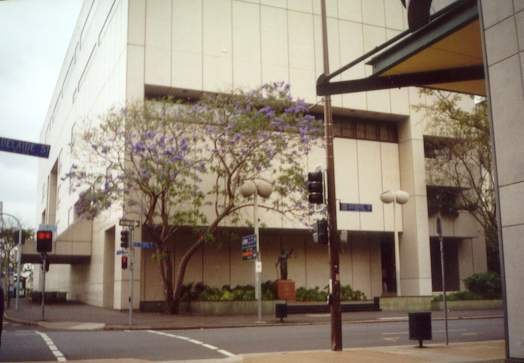
Law Courts, Brisbane; completed 1976–77

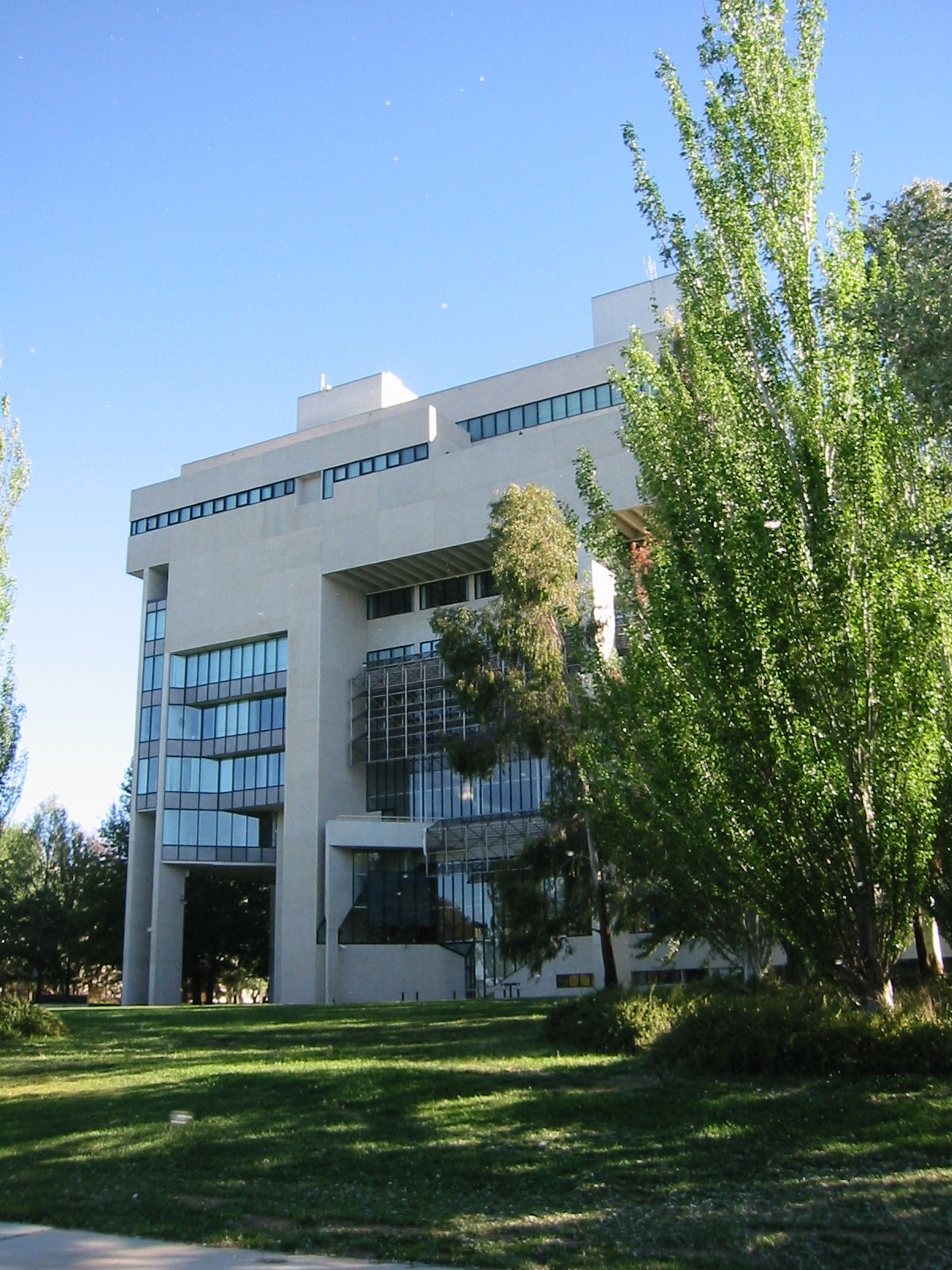
High Court of Australia, Canberra; completed 1980

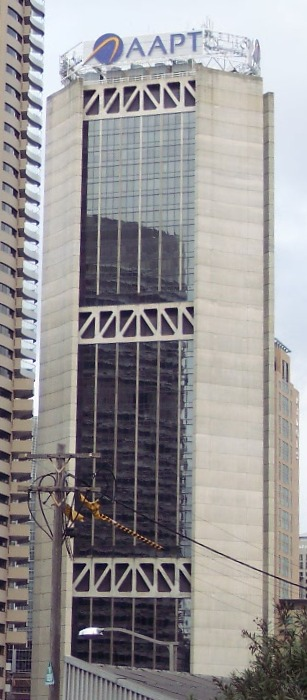
259 George Street, Sydney; completed 1982

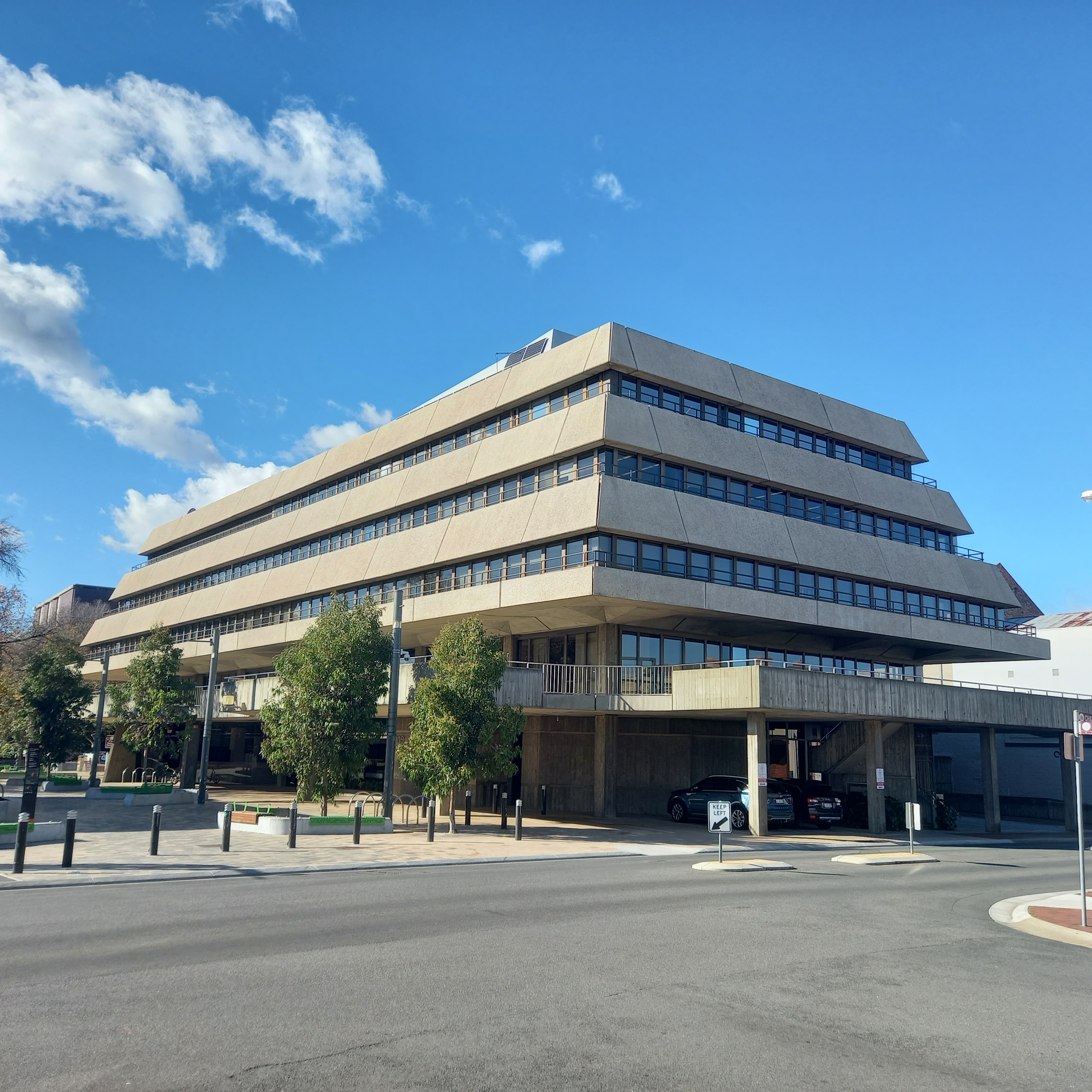
Henty House, Launceston; completed 1983

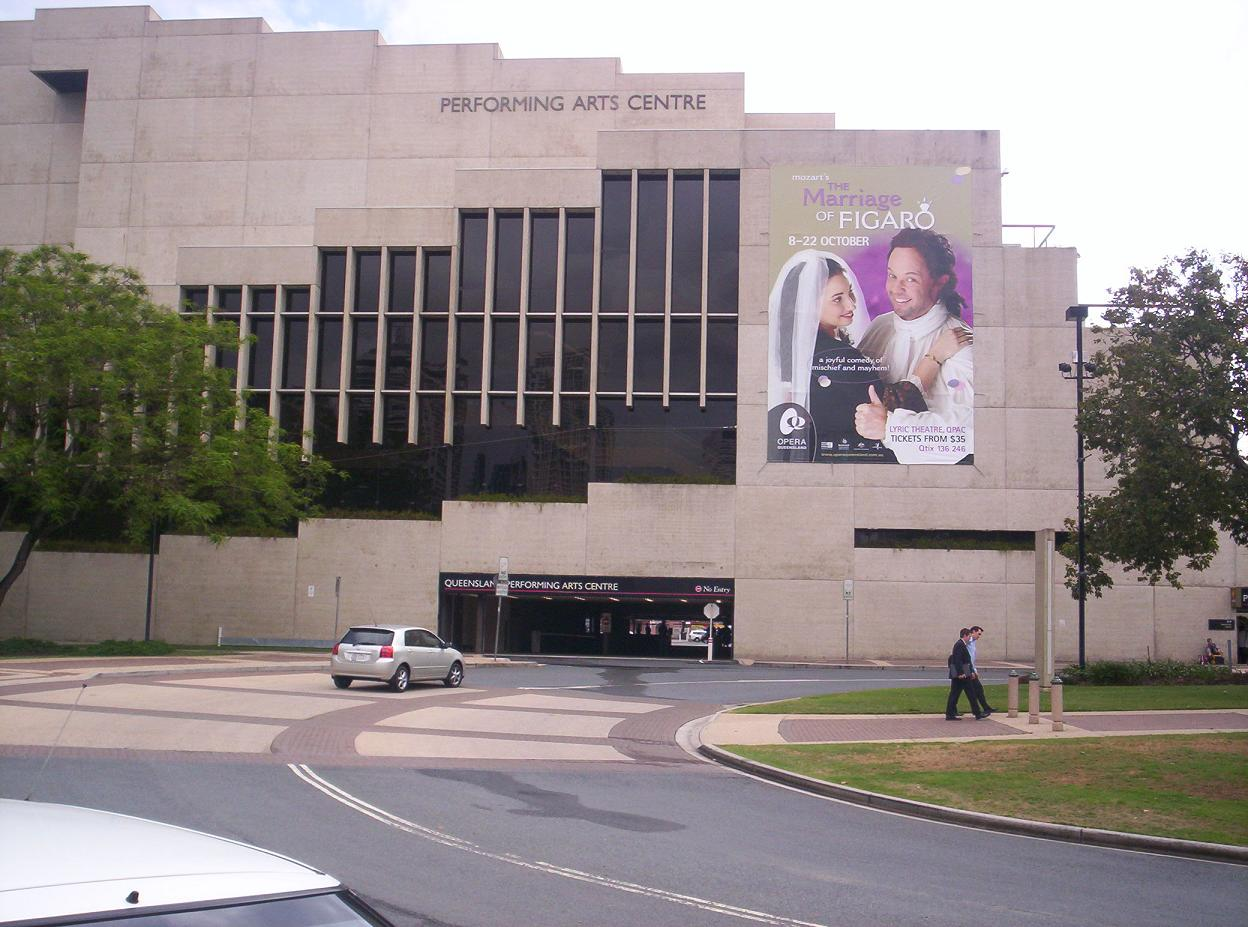
Queensland Performing Arts Complex, South Brisbane; completed 1985

=== Structuralist ===
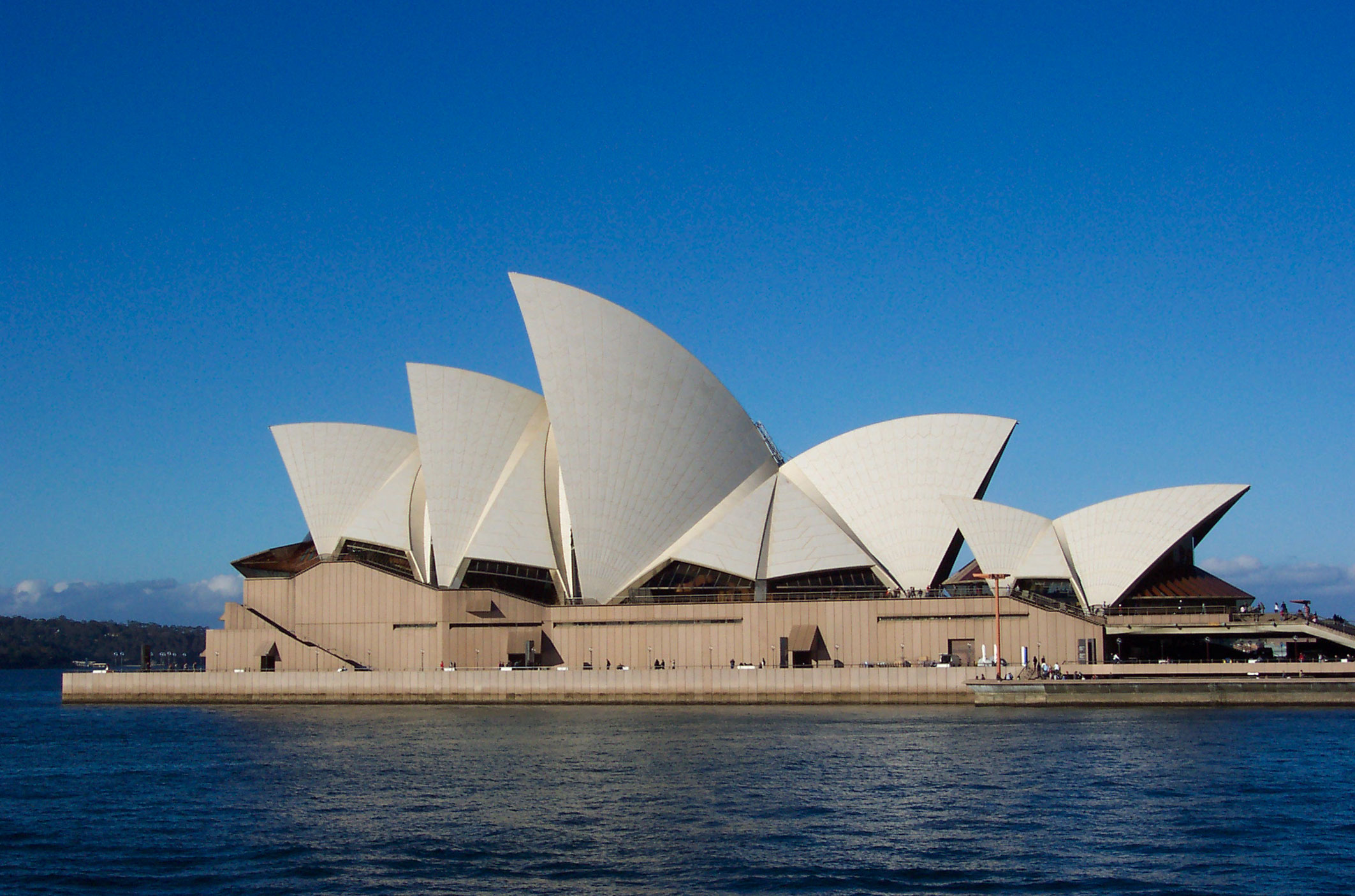
Sydney Opera House is often difficult to classify; completed 1973

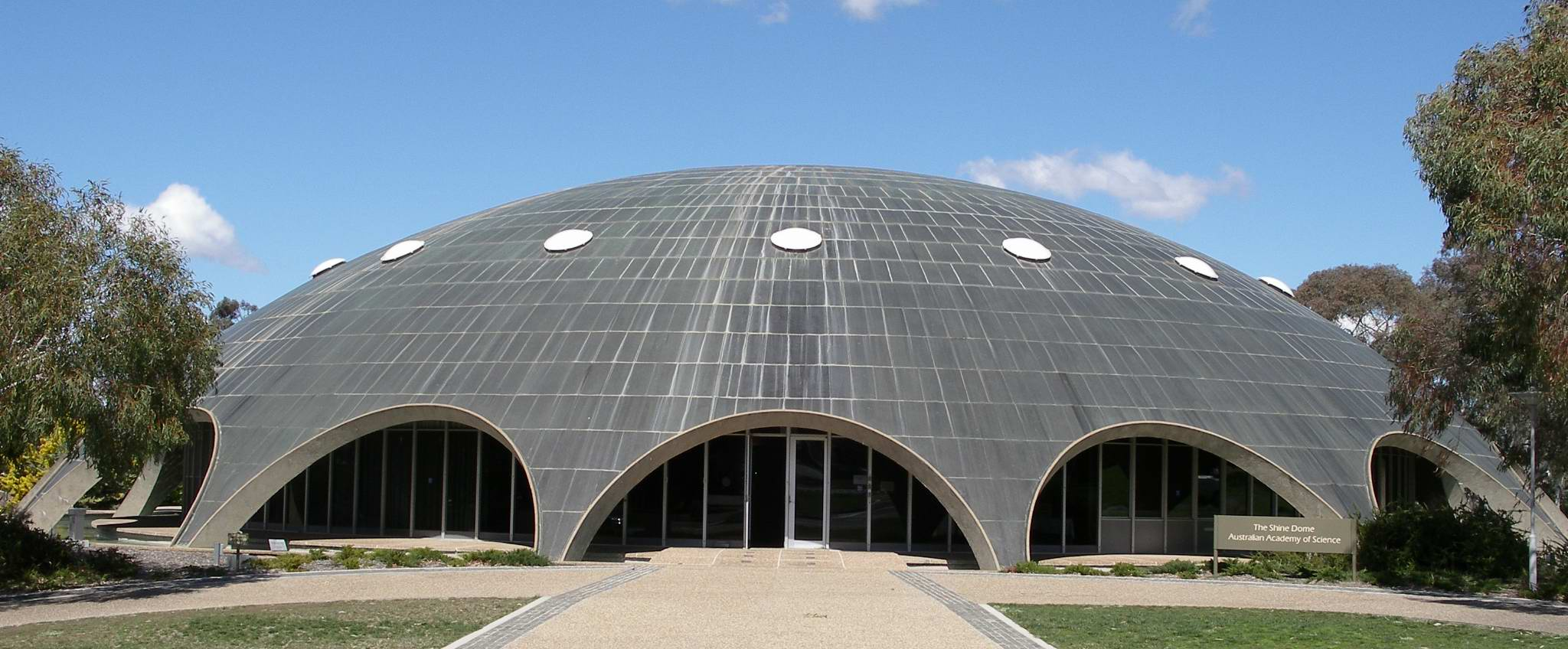
The Australian Academy of Science building, named the "Shine Dome", Canberra, designed by Roy Grounds; completed 1959

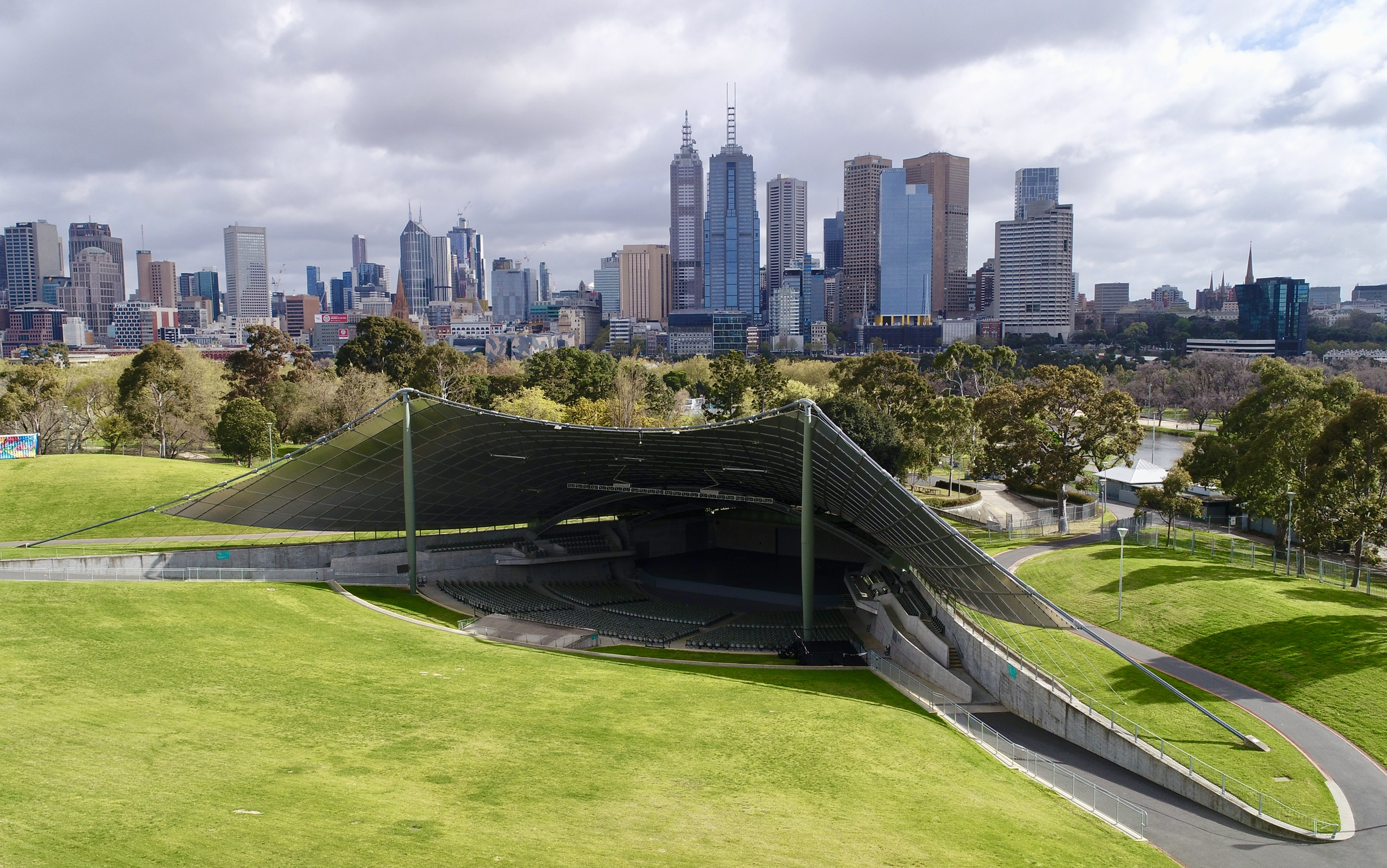
Sidney Myer Music Bowl, Melbourne; completed 1959 as one of the earliest examples of a tensile structure

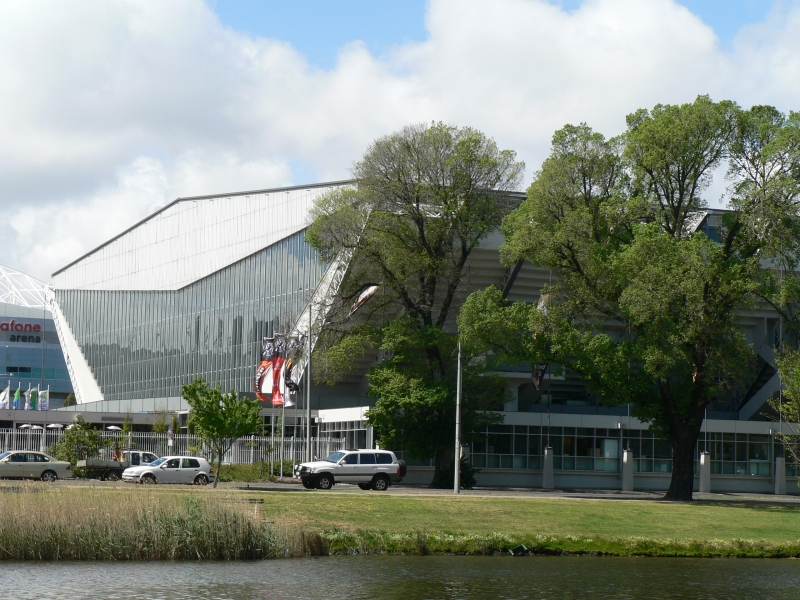
Lexus Centre (former Olympic Pool), Melbourne; completed 1956

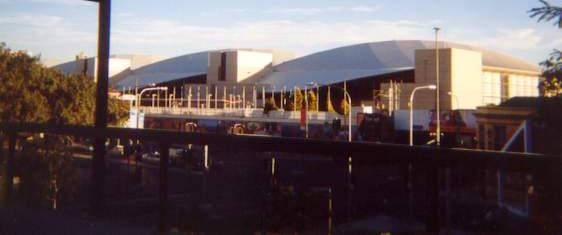
Brisbane Convention & Exhibition Centre; completed 1995 with a complex load-bearing hyperbolic paraboloid roof design, a precursor to 21st Century structuralism

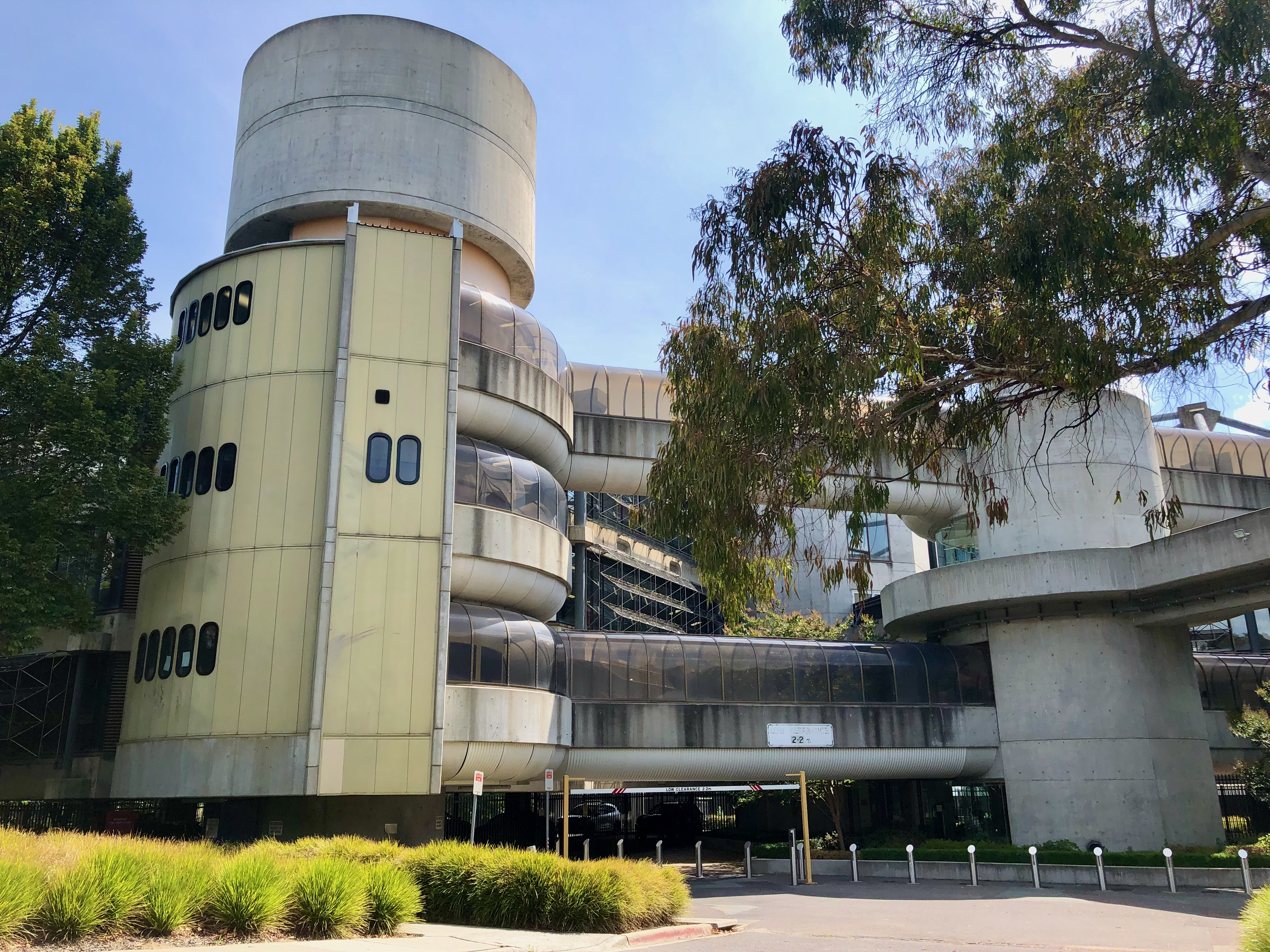
Callam Offices, Canberra; built 1977–1981; designed by John Andrews as a system of suspended office pods.

=== Late Modern ===
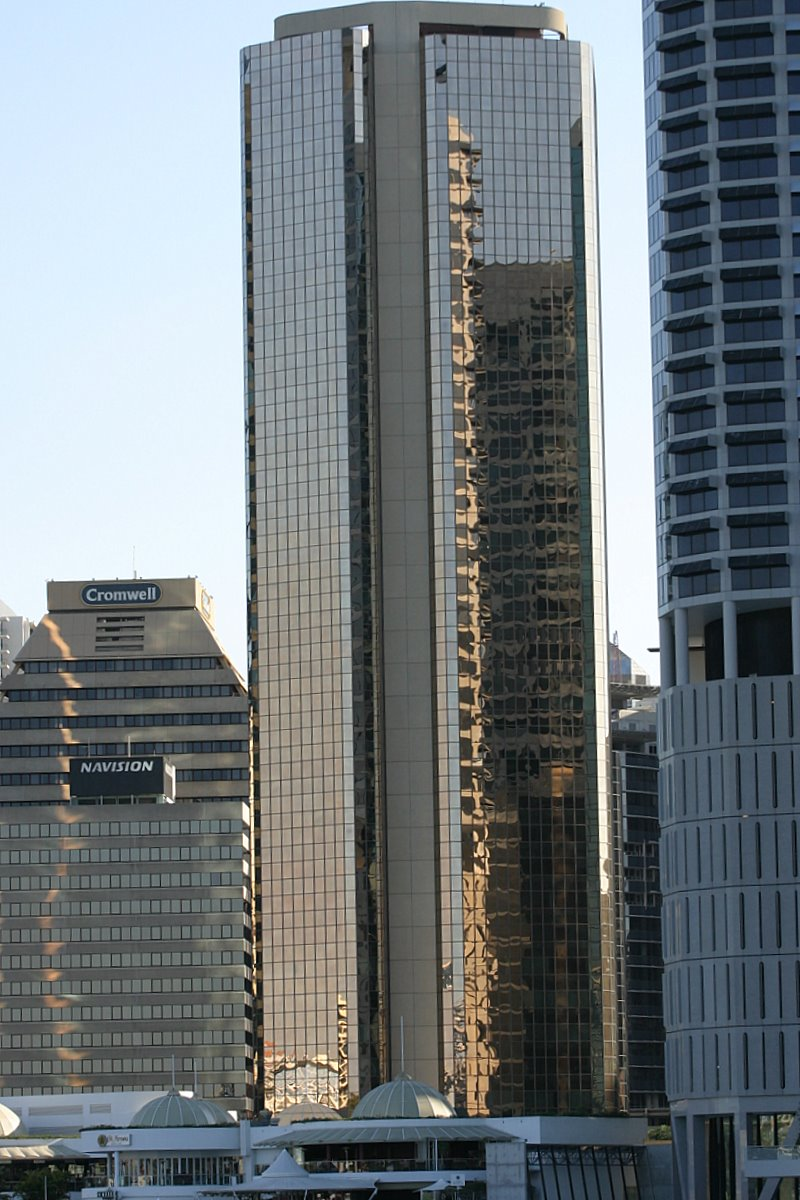
AMP Place, Brisbane; completed in 1977 as an early example of late modern curtain walled mirror glass skyscraper

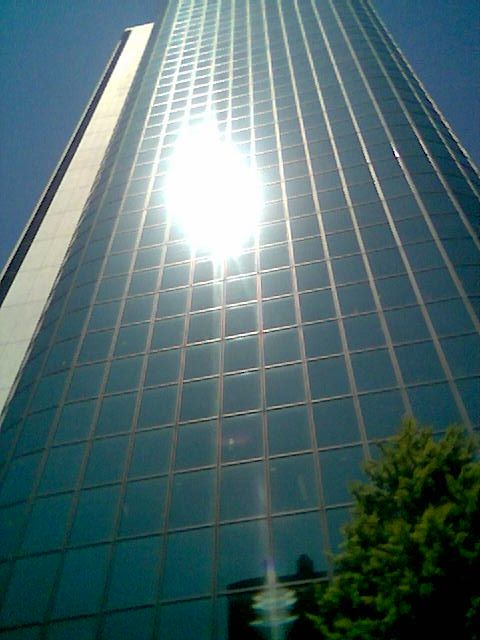
200 Queen Street, Melbourne; completed in 1983 as a curved mirror glass skyscraper

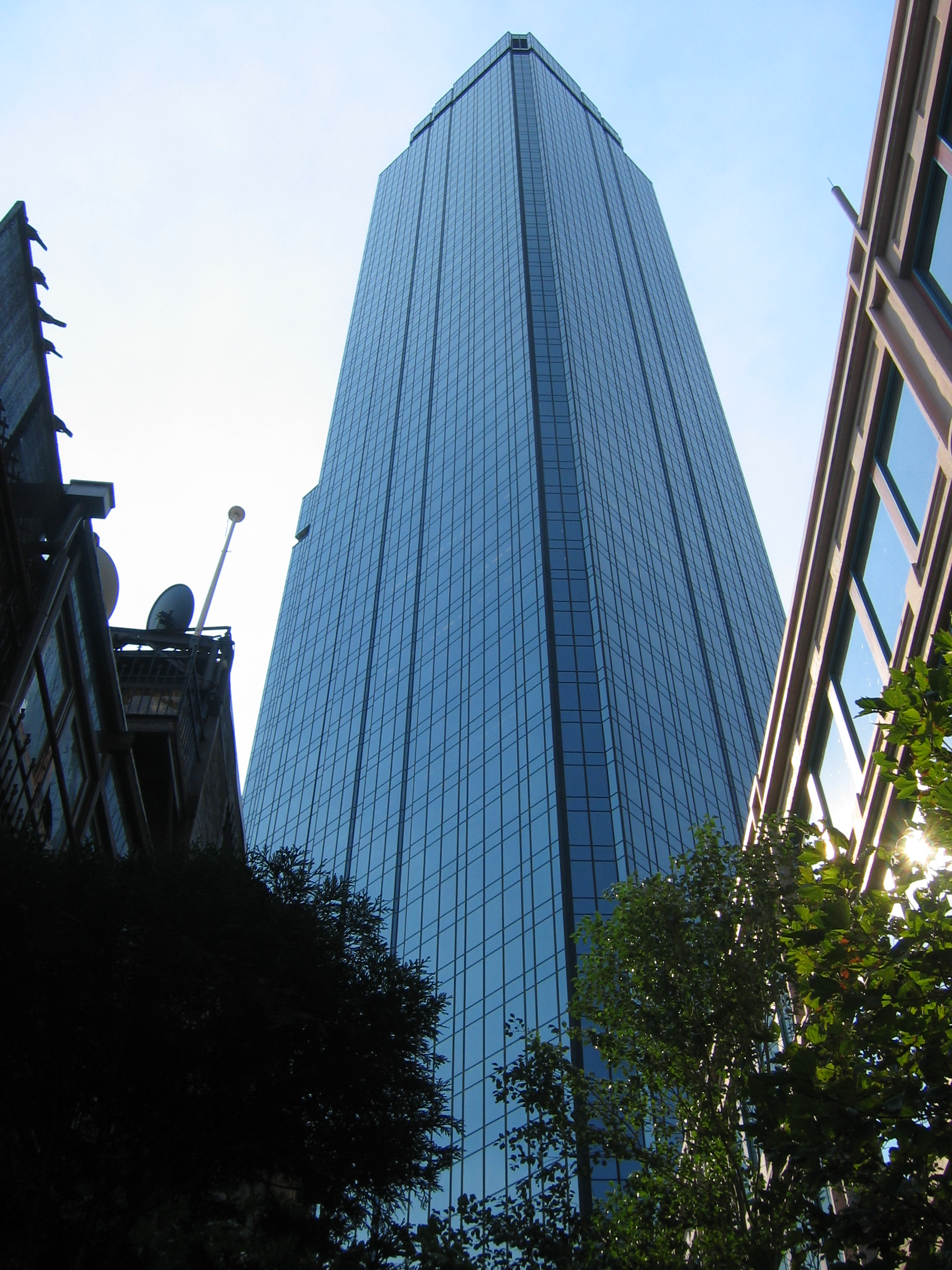
Rialto Towers, Melbourne; completed 1986 as Australia's best example of a mirror glass corporate skyscraper

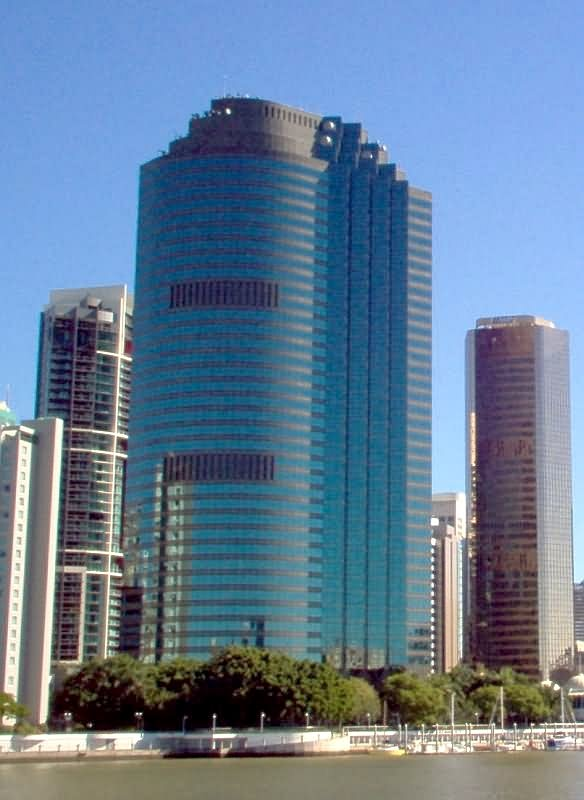
Waterfront Place, Brisbane; completed 1989

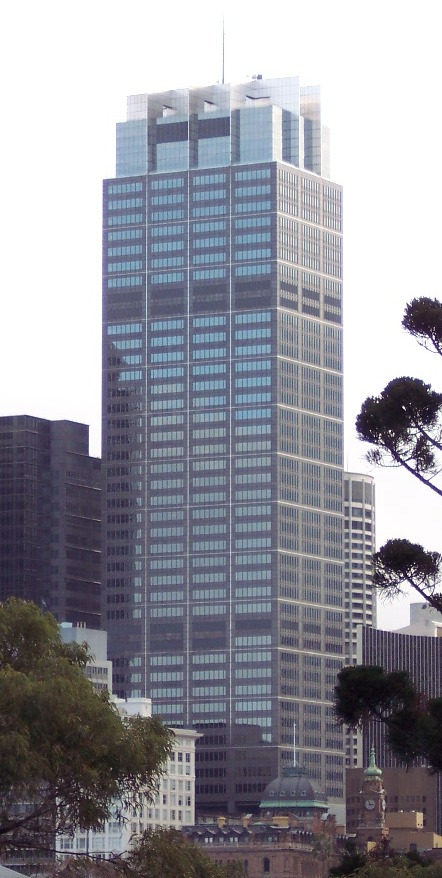
Governor Phillip Tower, Sydney; completed 1994

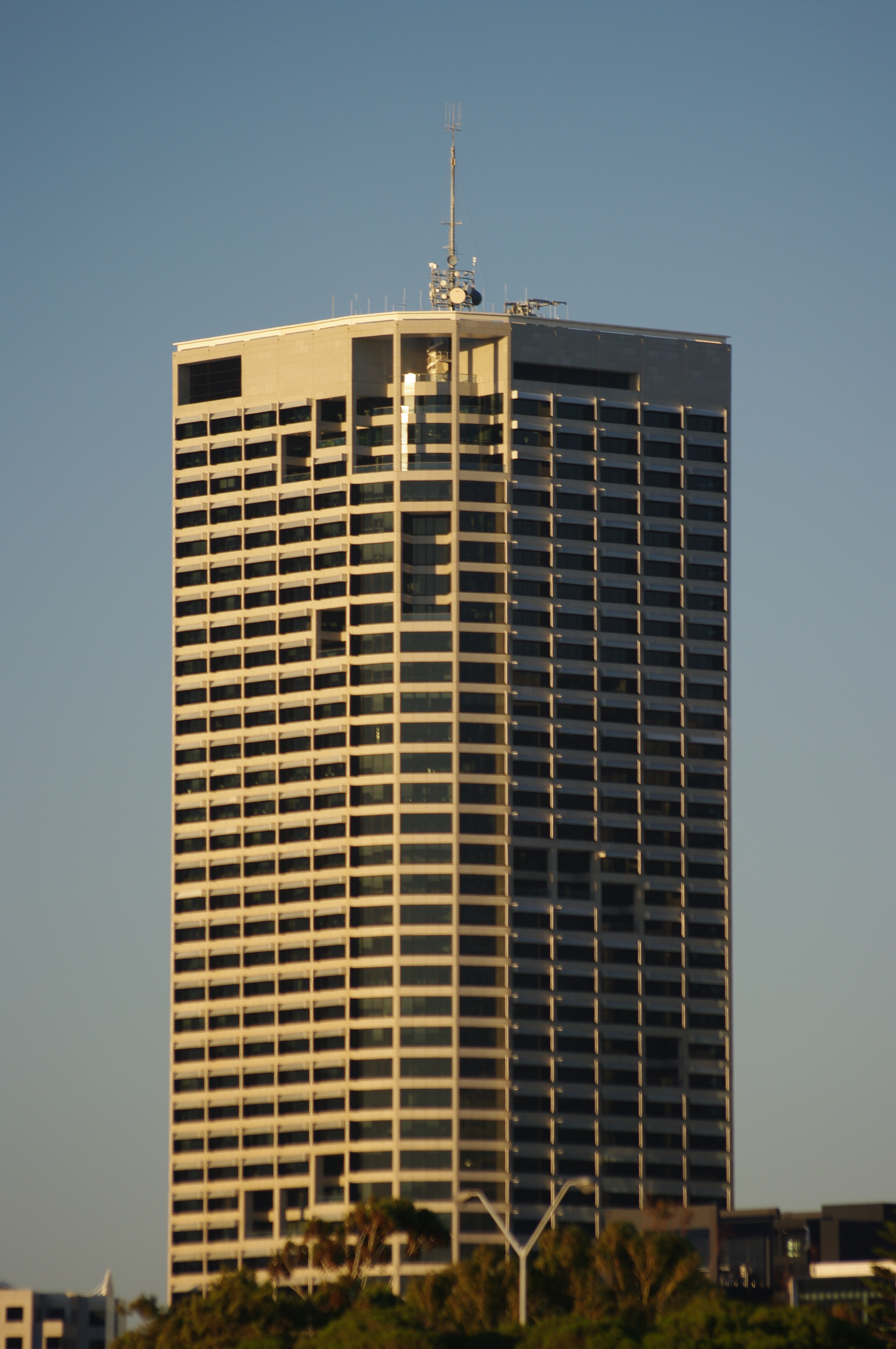
QV1, Perth; completed 1991

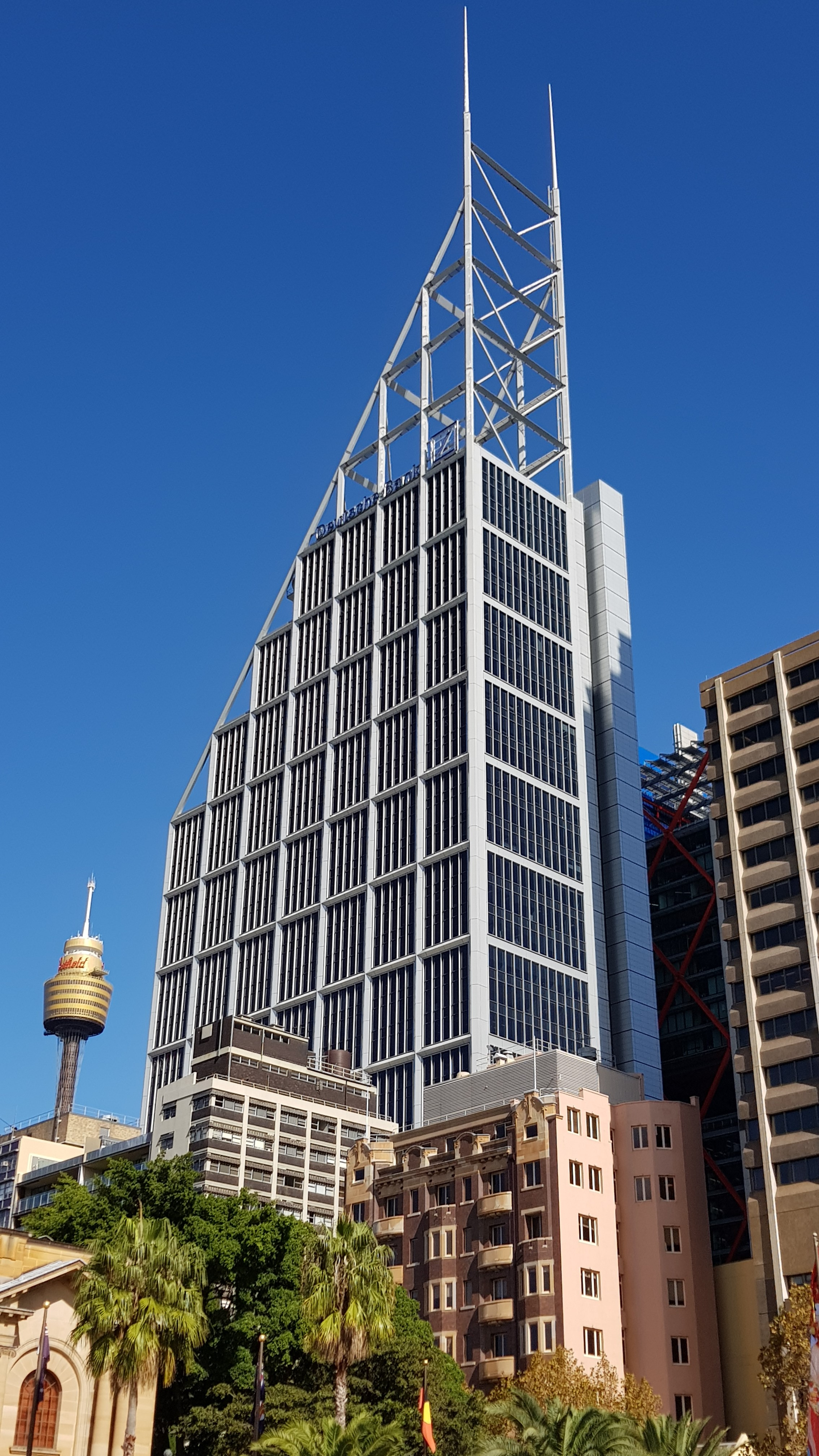
Deutsche Bank Place, Sydney; completed 2005

=== Post Modern ===
A subset of postmodernism is mock-historicism tries to imitate historic styles using modern materials to the point where it is difficult to tell them apart from historic buildings. The most imitated styles are those that are easiest to clone (including the Georgian style).

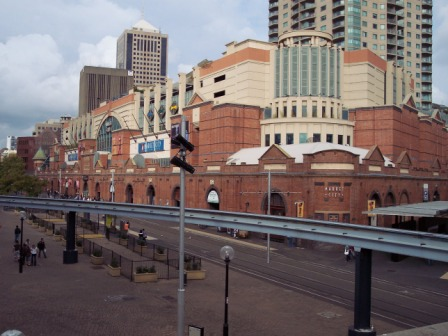
Paddy's Markets, Haymarket, Sydney; redevelopment completed 1976, with the tower reflective of the building style

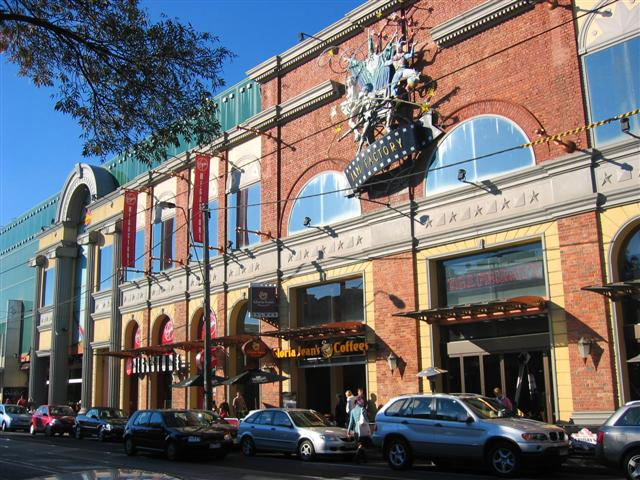
The Jam Factory Chapel Street, South Yarra; redevelopment completed 1979 that features mock historical elements juxtaposted with old factory

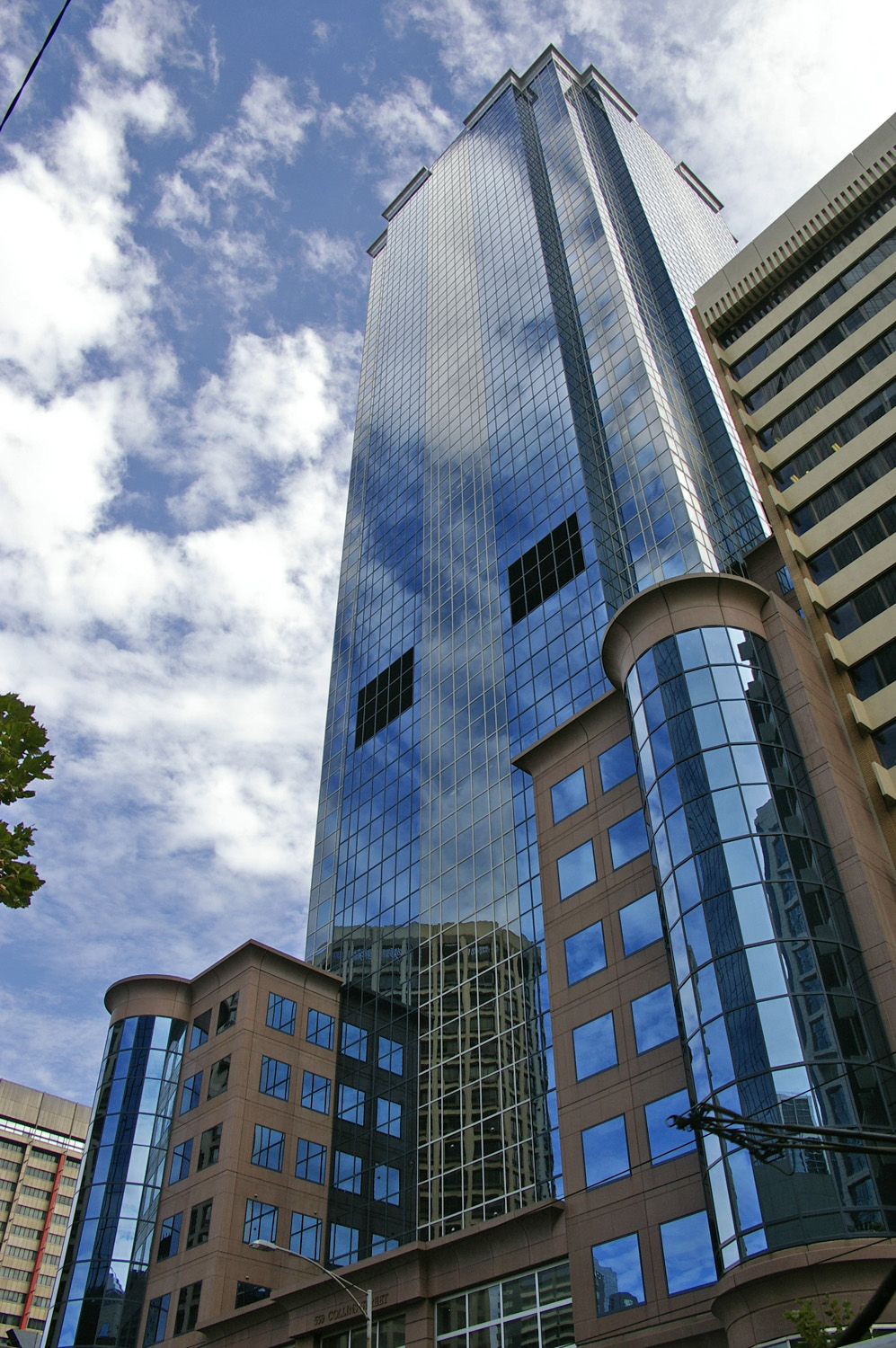
Former Australian Stock Exchange, Collins Street, Melbourne; completed 1990 that features a classical inspired podium base and Georgian inspired pyramid roof

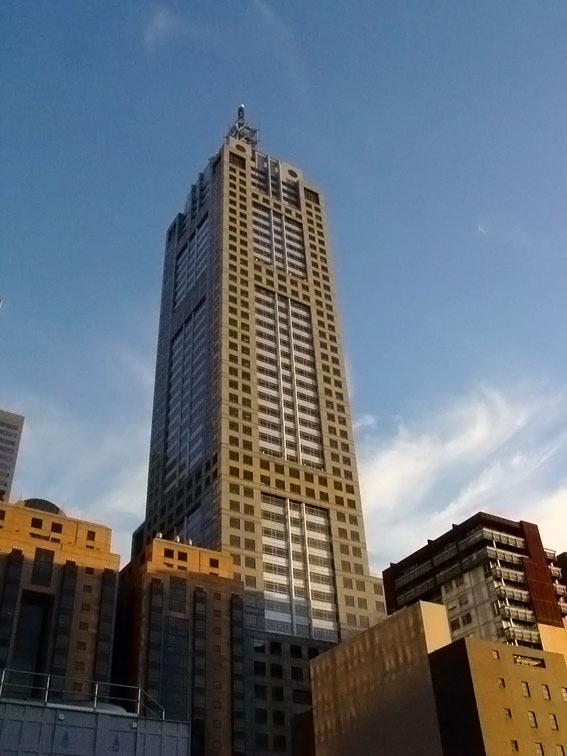
120 Collins Street, Melbourne; completed 1991 and is evocative of an interwar North American skyscraper

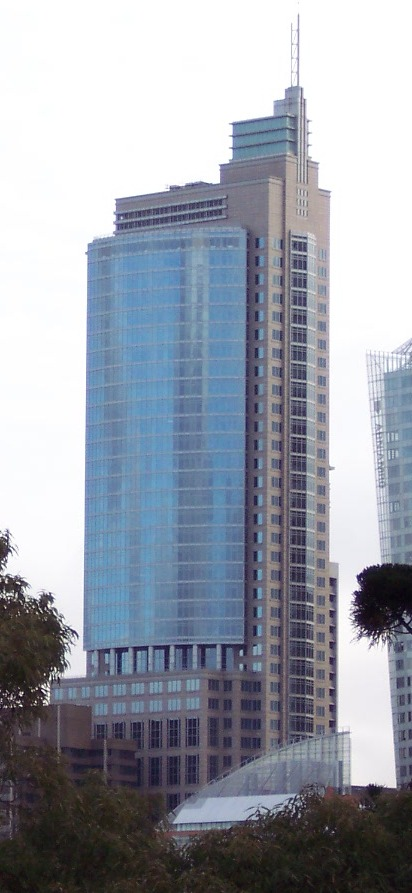
Chifley Tower, Sydney, completed 1992 and inspired by interwar North American skyscraper

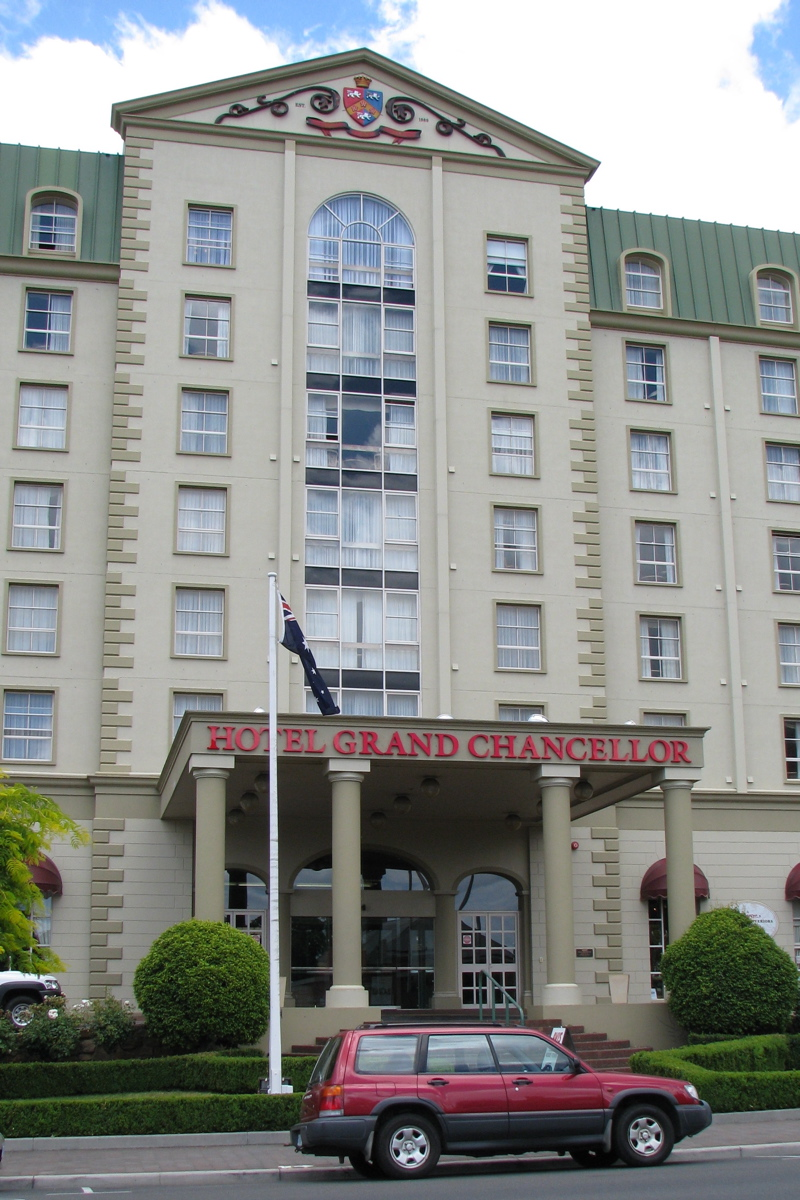
Hotel Grand Chancellor, Launceston, Tasmania; completed 1993, and is a mock historic composition of Georgian and Second Empire styles

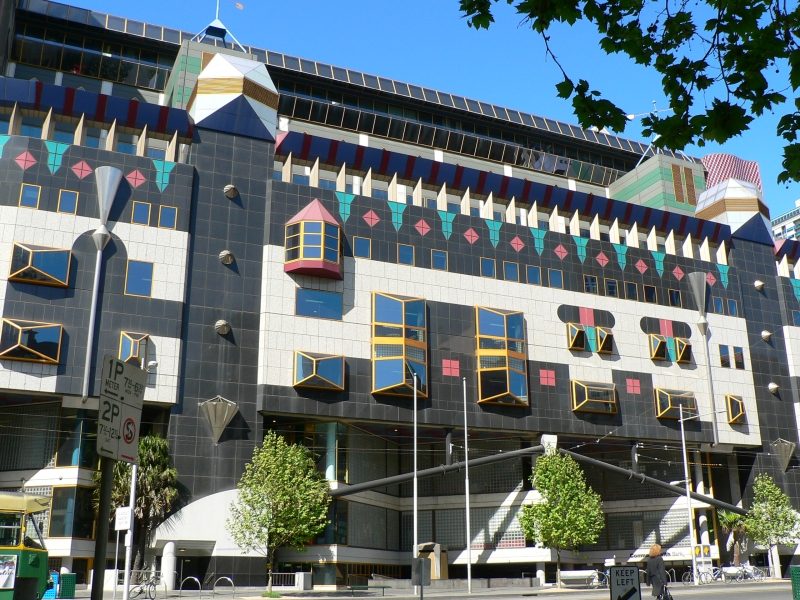
Building 8, RMIT Swanston Street campus, Melbourne, completed 1993 with use of novel decorative elements and references to pop-culture

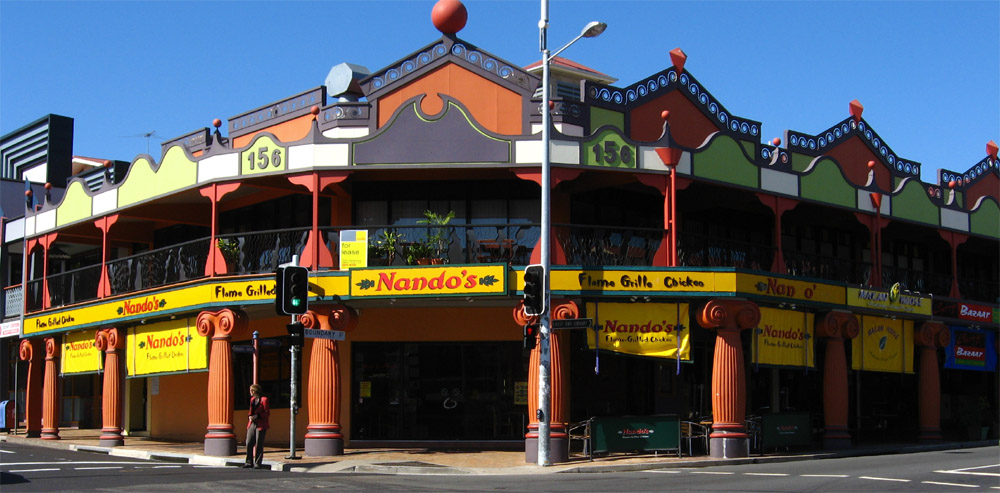
Boundary Street retail buildings, West End, Brisbane; completed 1999 as a cartoonish take on Victorian Mannerism

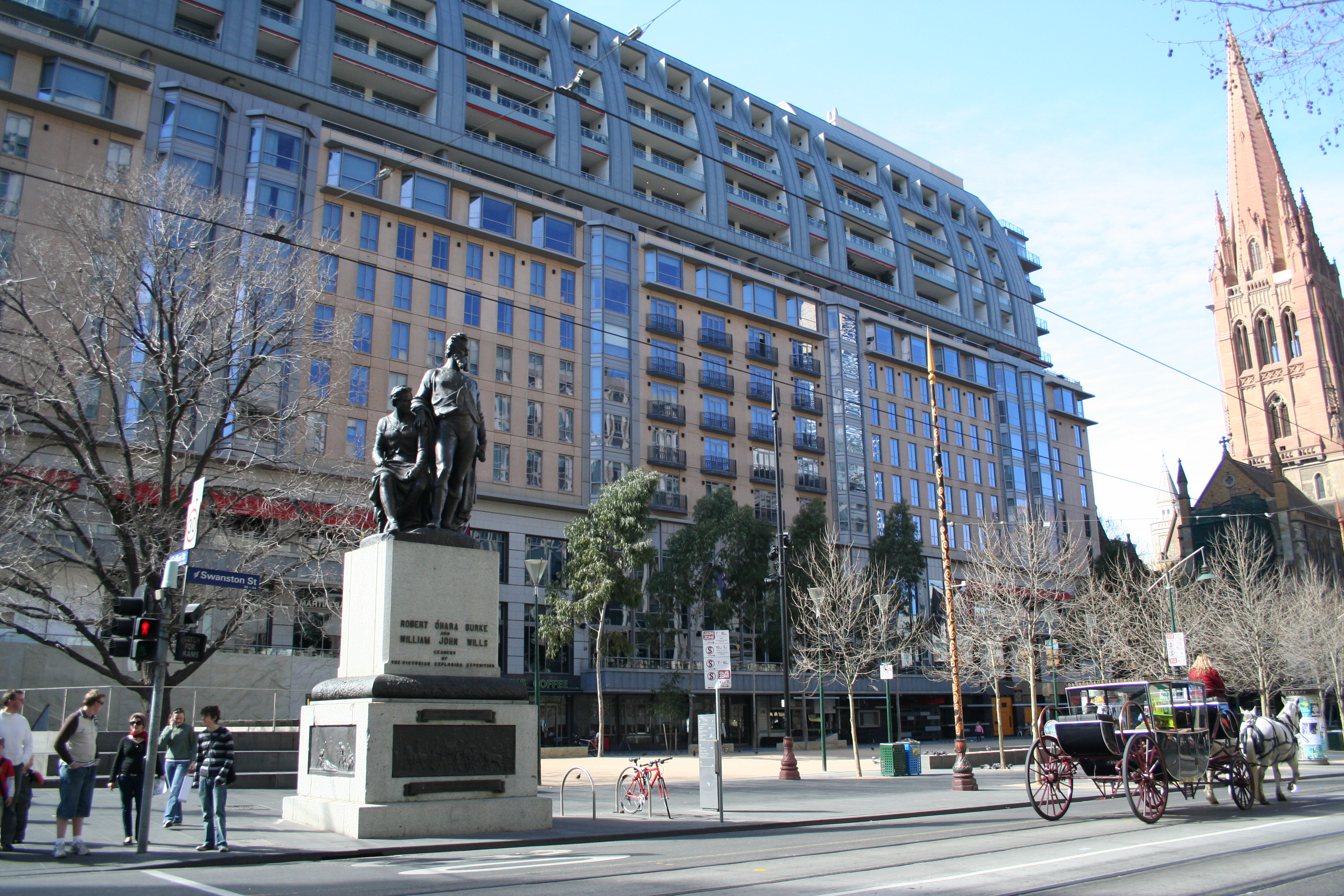
Westin Hotel, Collins Street, Melbourne; completed 2000, evocative of the Second Empire

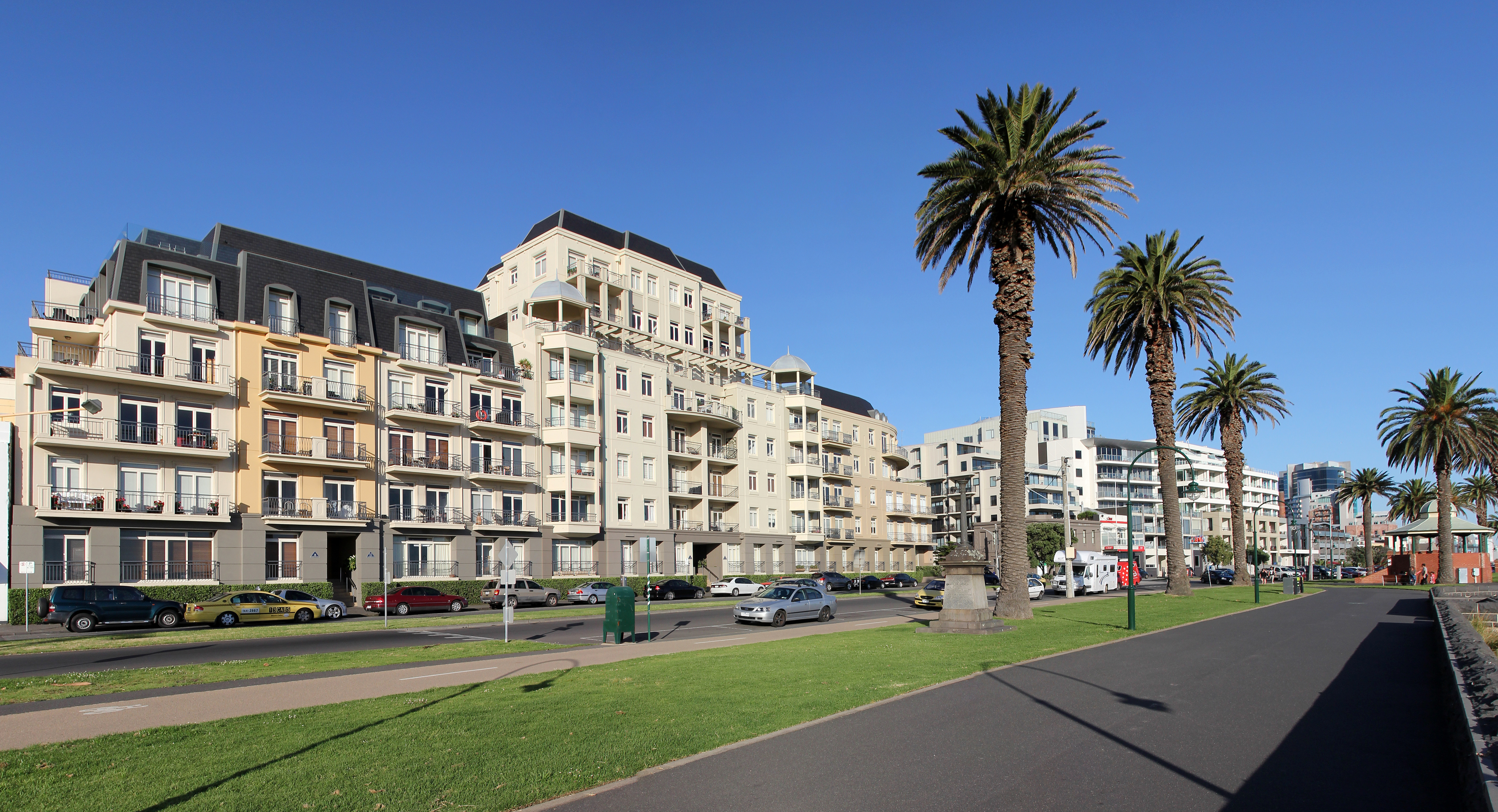
Apartments in Port Melbourne; completed 2001, evocative of the Second Empire

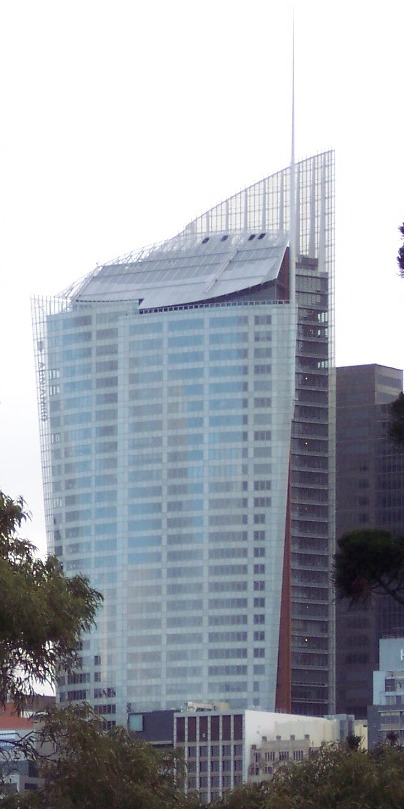
Aurora Place, Sydney; completed 2000

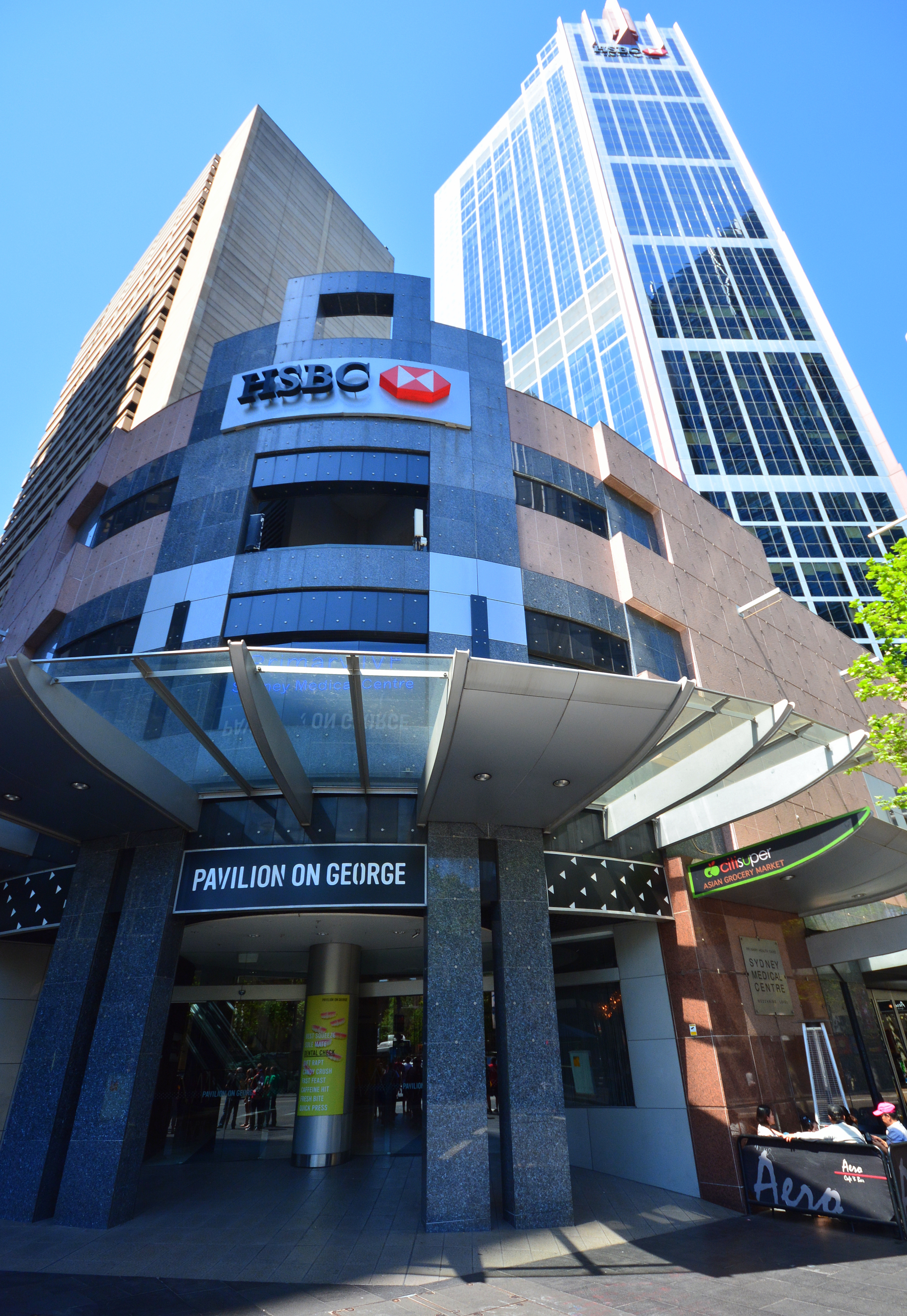
HSBC Building, George Street, Sydney; completed 1987

=== Deconstructivist ===
Notable examples include Green Building RMIT; Deakin University main building; Australian Centre for Contemporary Art; Gottlieb House (Melbourne)

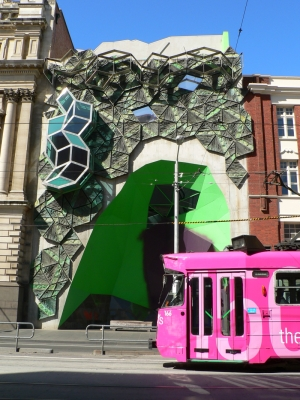
Storey Hall, also called the Green Building, at RMIT Swanston Street campus, Melbourne; completed 1994 as one of the earliest examples of deconstructivist design in Australia

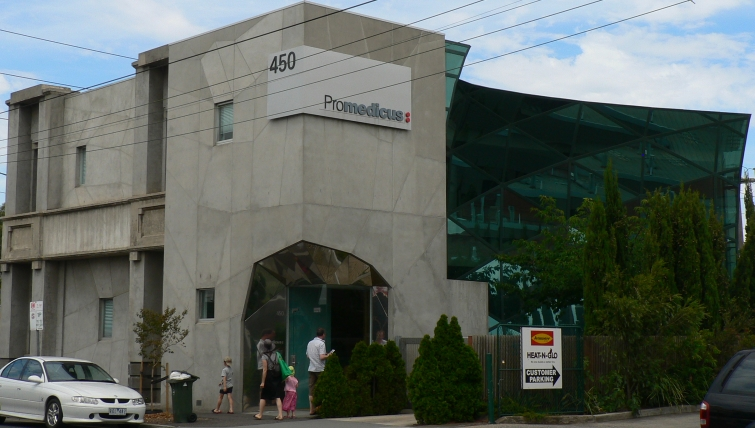
450 Swan Street, Richmond, Melbourne; completed 1995 and the deconstructivist form integrates an old bank with new offices

=== Immigrant's Nostalgic ===
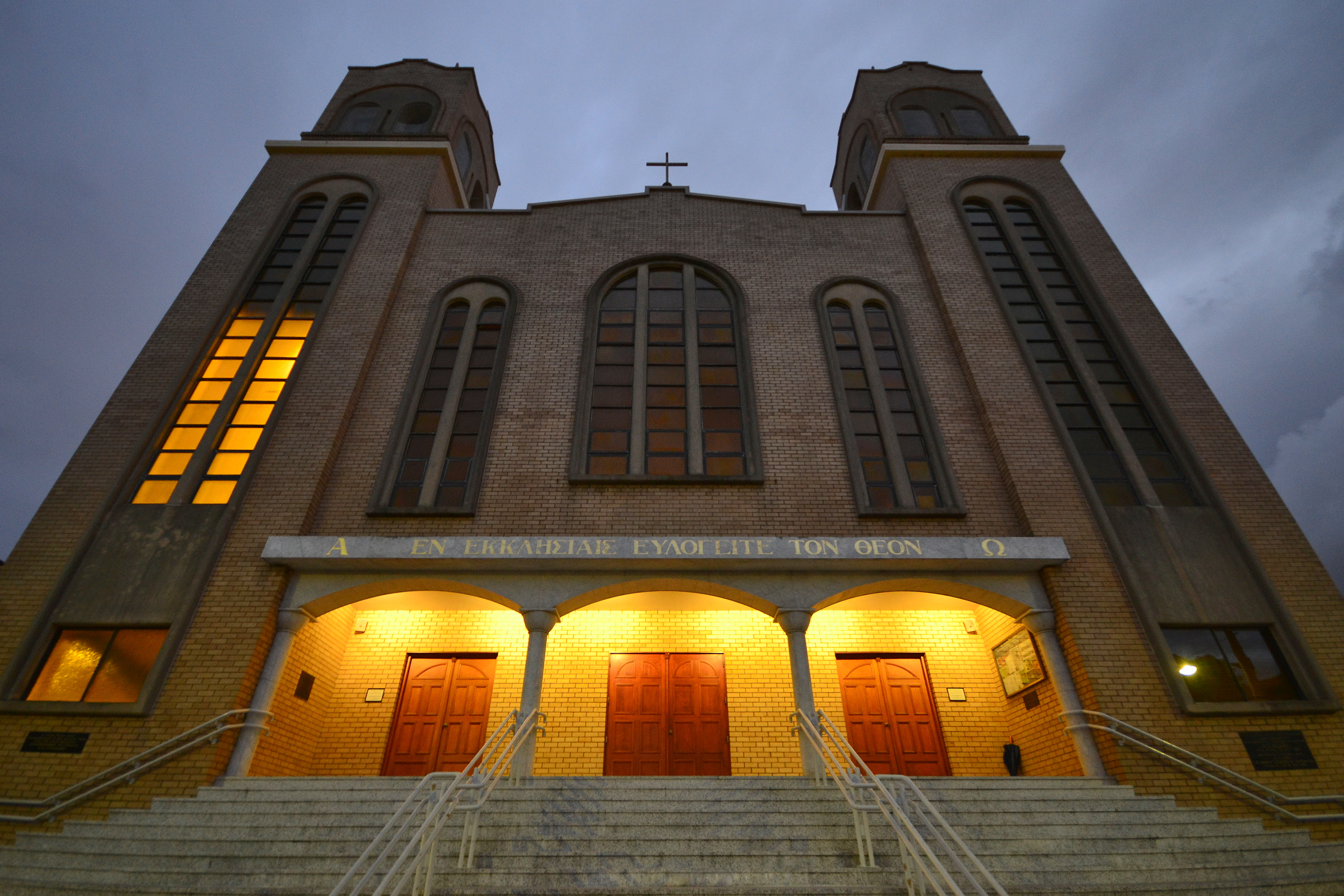
St Spyridon Greek Orthodox Church, Kingsford, Sydney; completed 1975

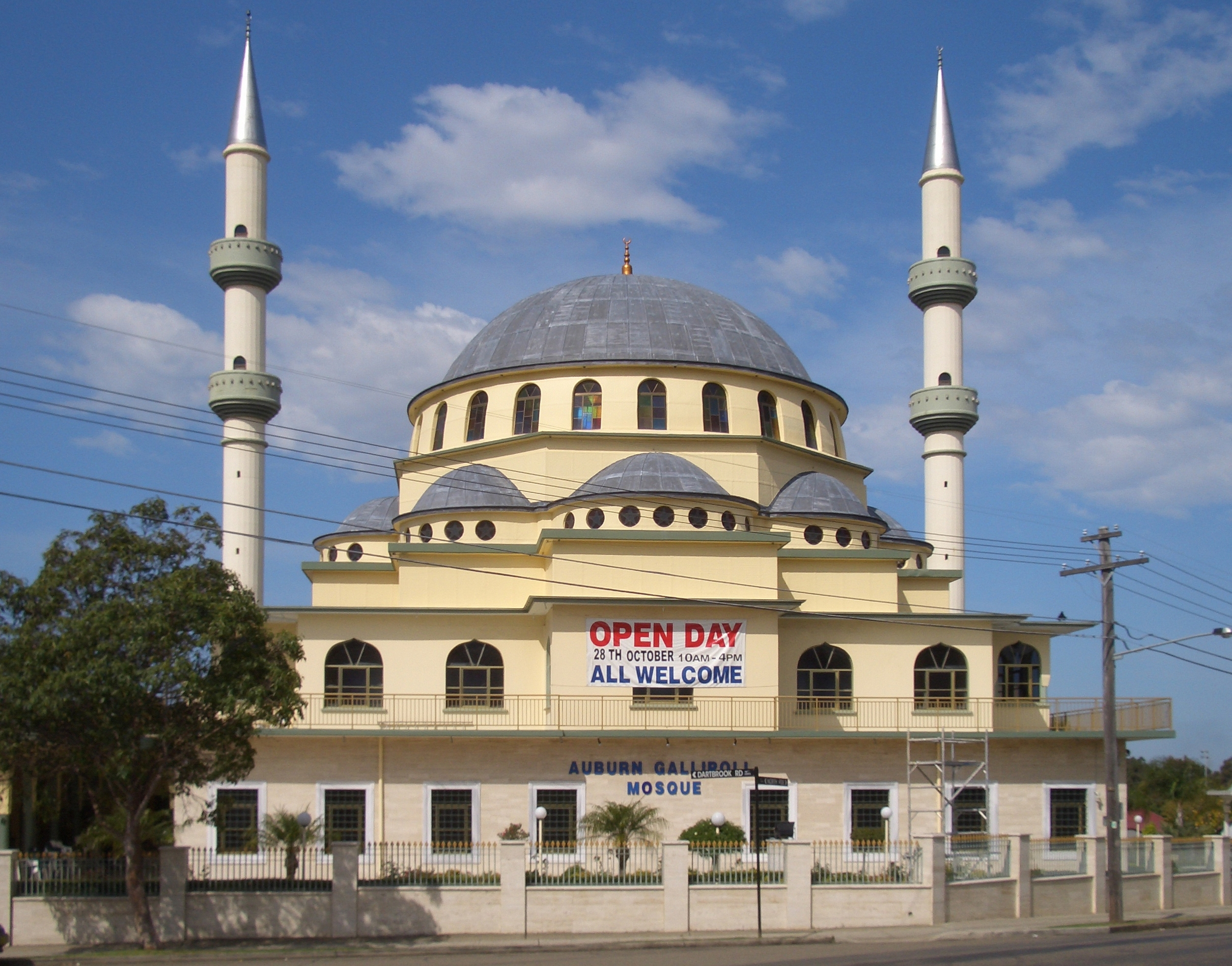
Auburn Gallipoli Mosque, Auburn, Sydney; completed 1999

== 21st-century architecture ==
Several new and continued 20th-century styles, all prefaced with "21st-century" - Deconstructivist, Post modern, Structuralist, Sustainable, Modern

=== Deconstructivist ===
Notable examples include Federation Square; Shrine of Remembrance crypt; Sofo House (Melbourne) Swan Bells (Perth)

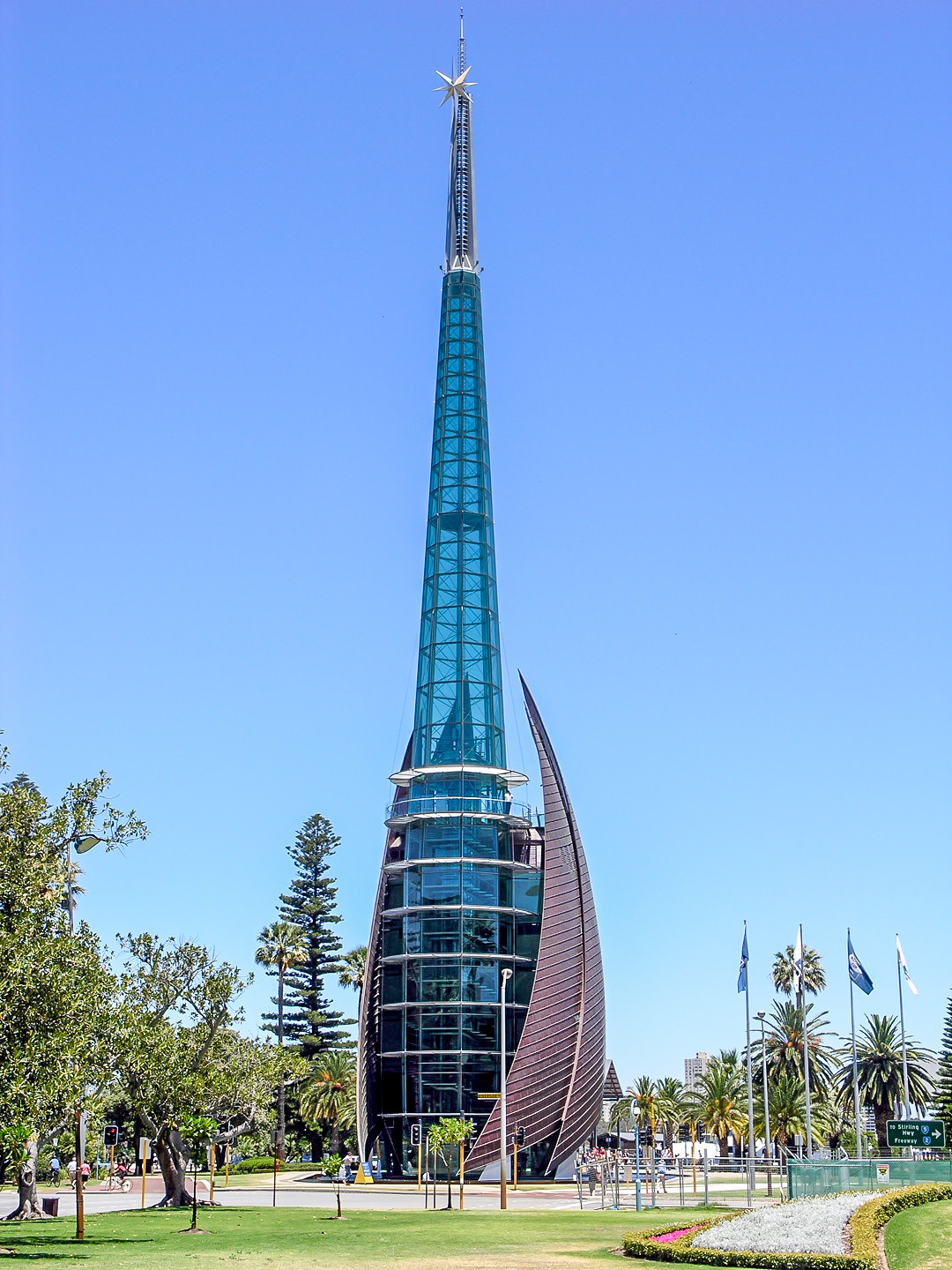
Swan Bells. Perth. Completed in 2000.

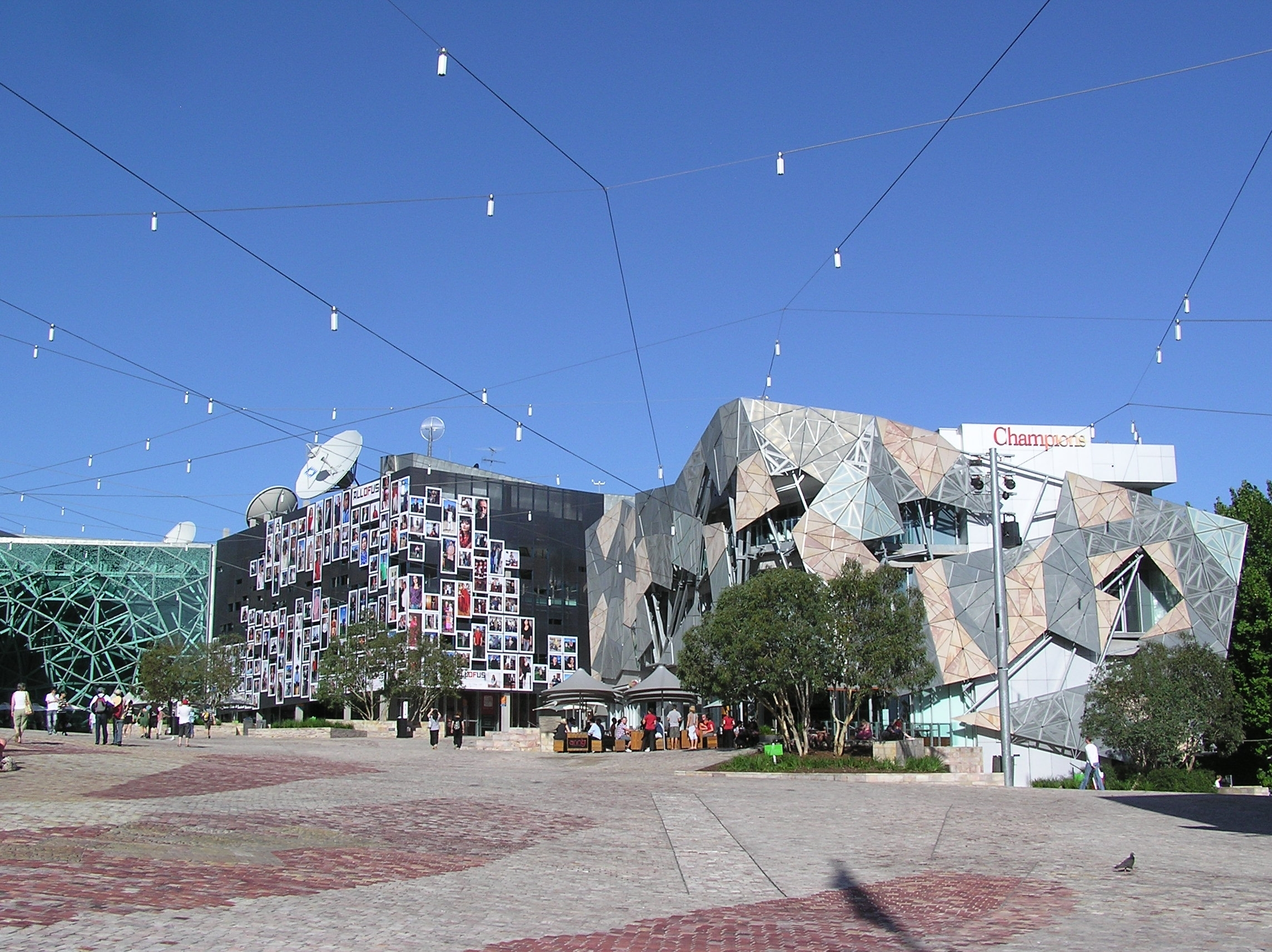
Federation Square. Melbourne. Completed 2002.

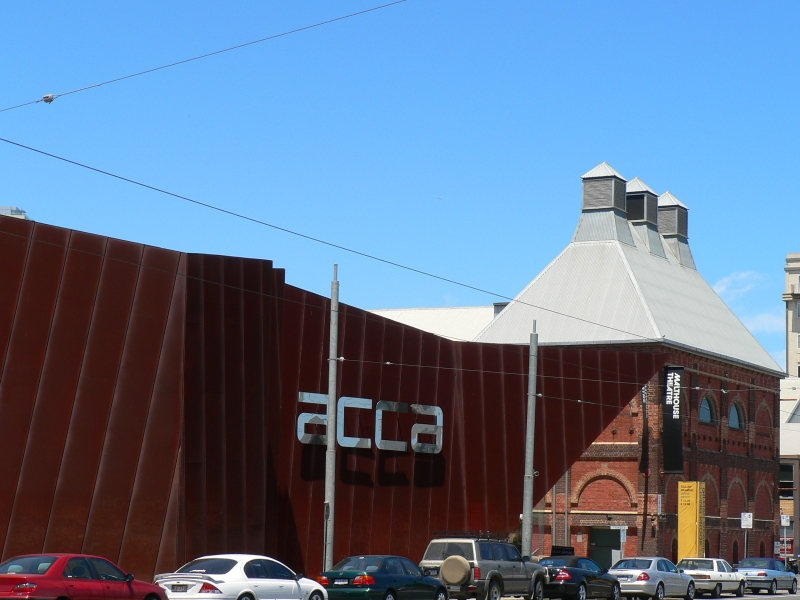
Australian Centre for Contemporary Art. Southbank. Completed 2002

=== Post Modern ===
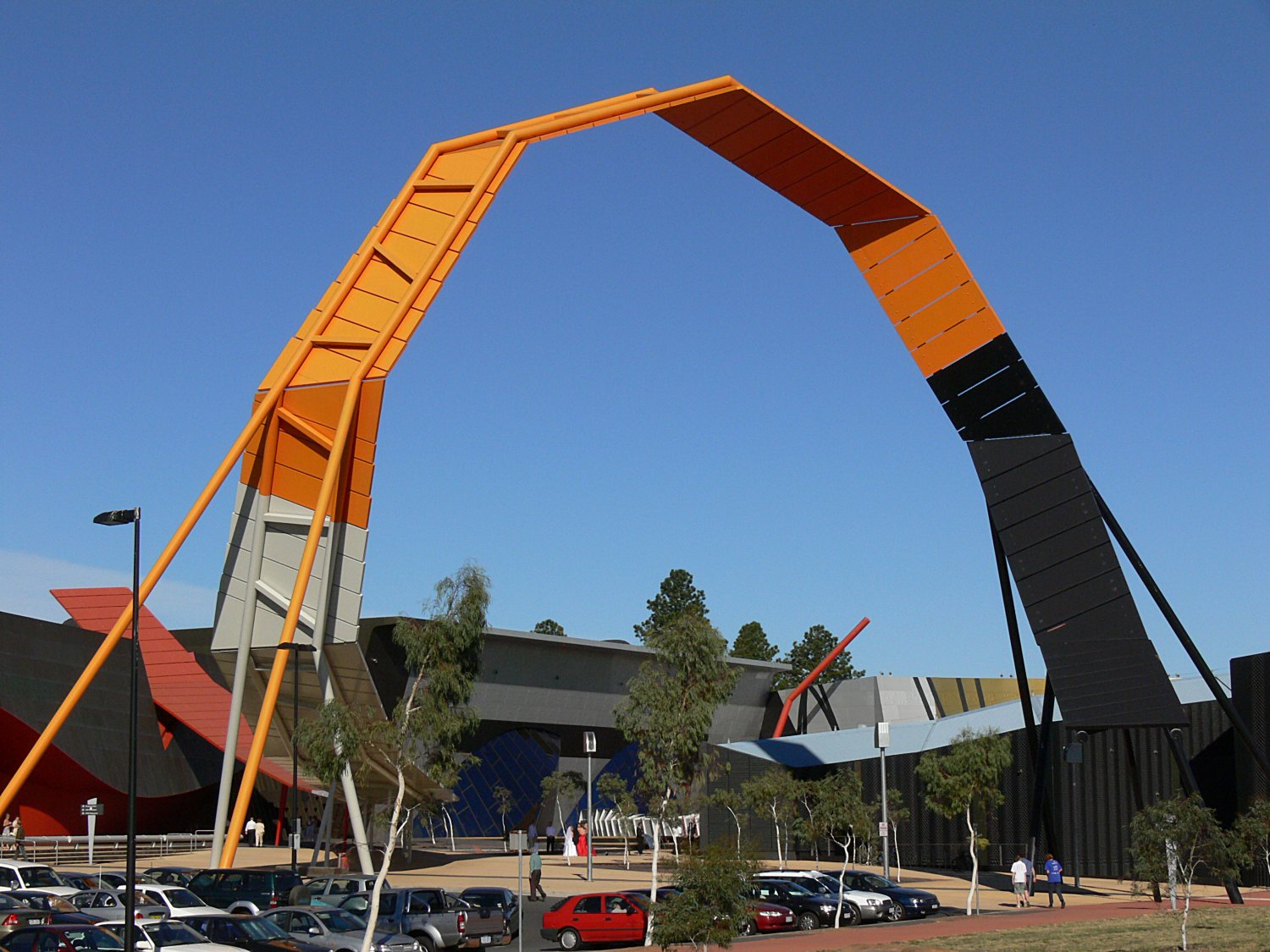
National Museum of Australia. Completed 2001.

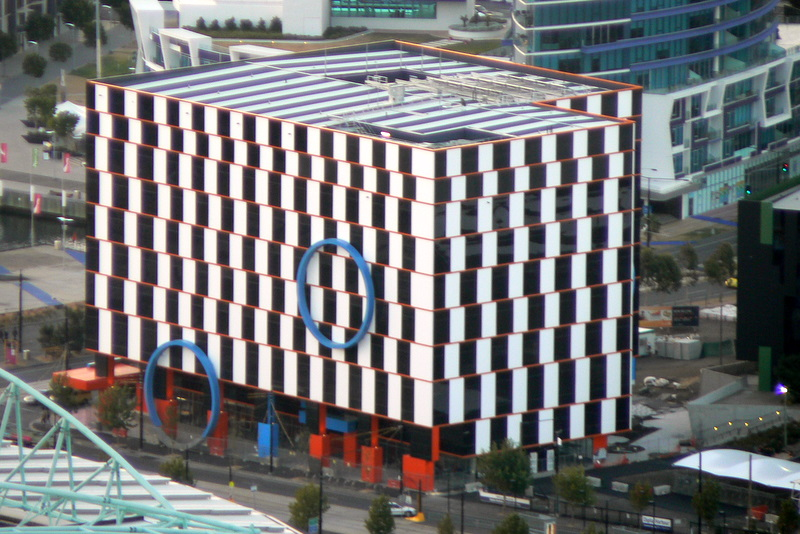
Port 1010 building at the Digital Harbour precinct, Melbourne Docklands. Completed 2008.

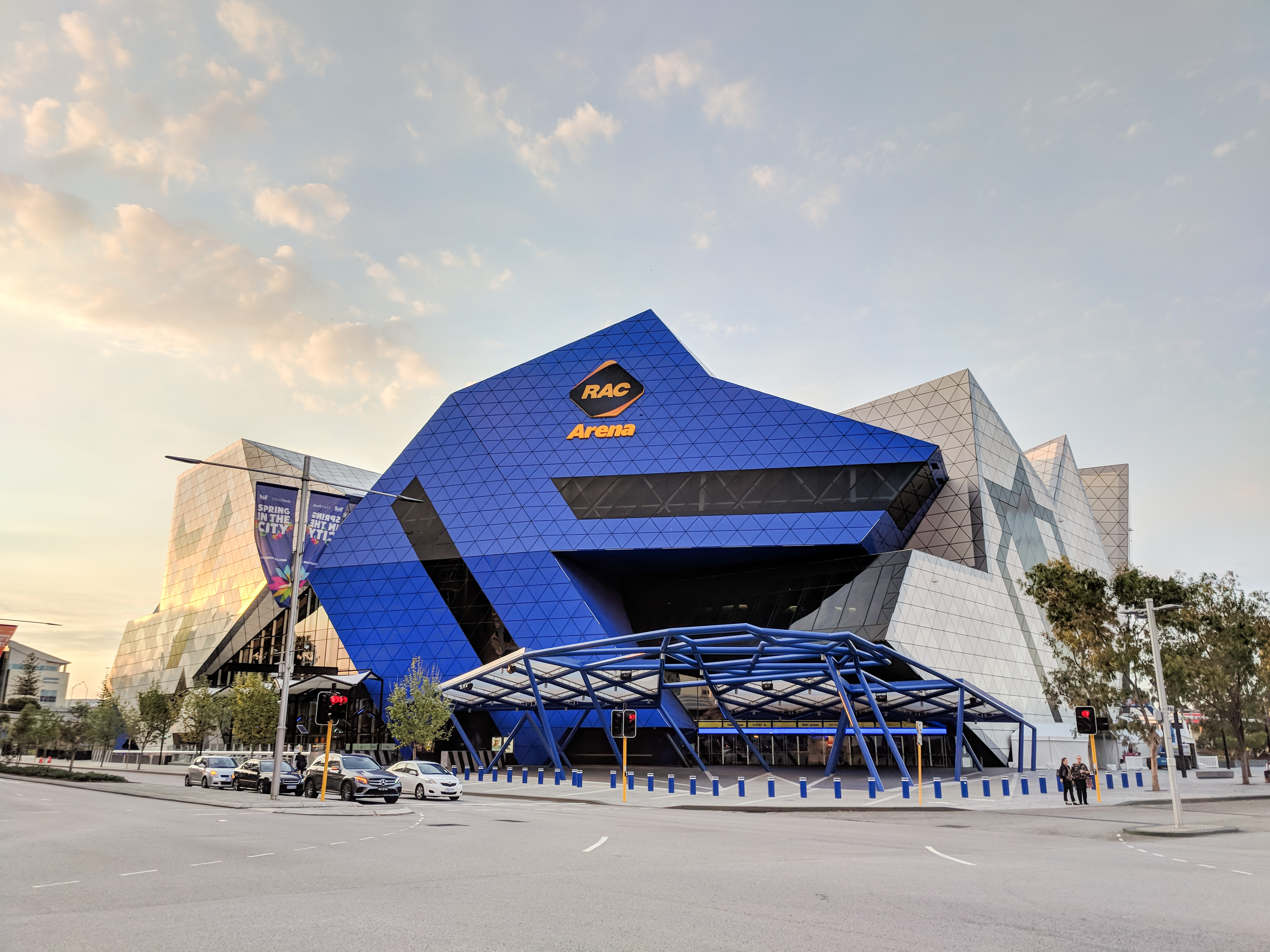
Perth Arena. Completed 2012.

=== Structuralist ===
Advanced structuralism facilitated by Computer Aided Design

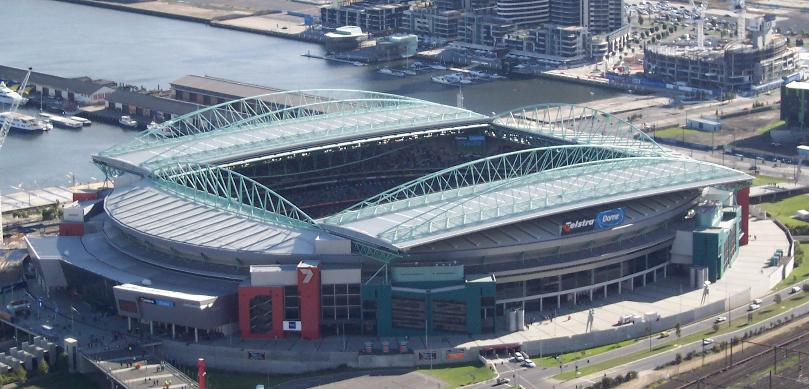
Docklands Stadium. Melbourne; completed 2000.

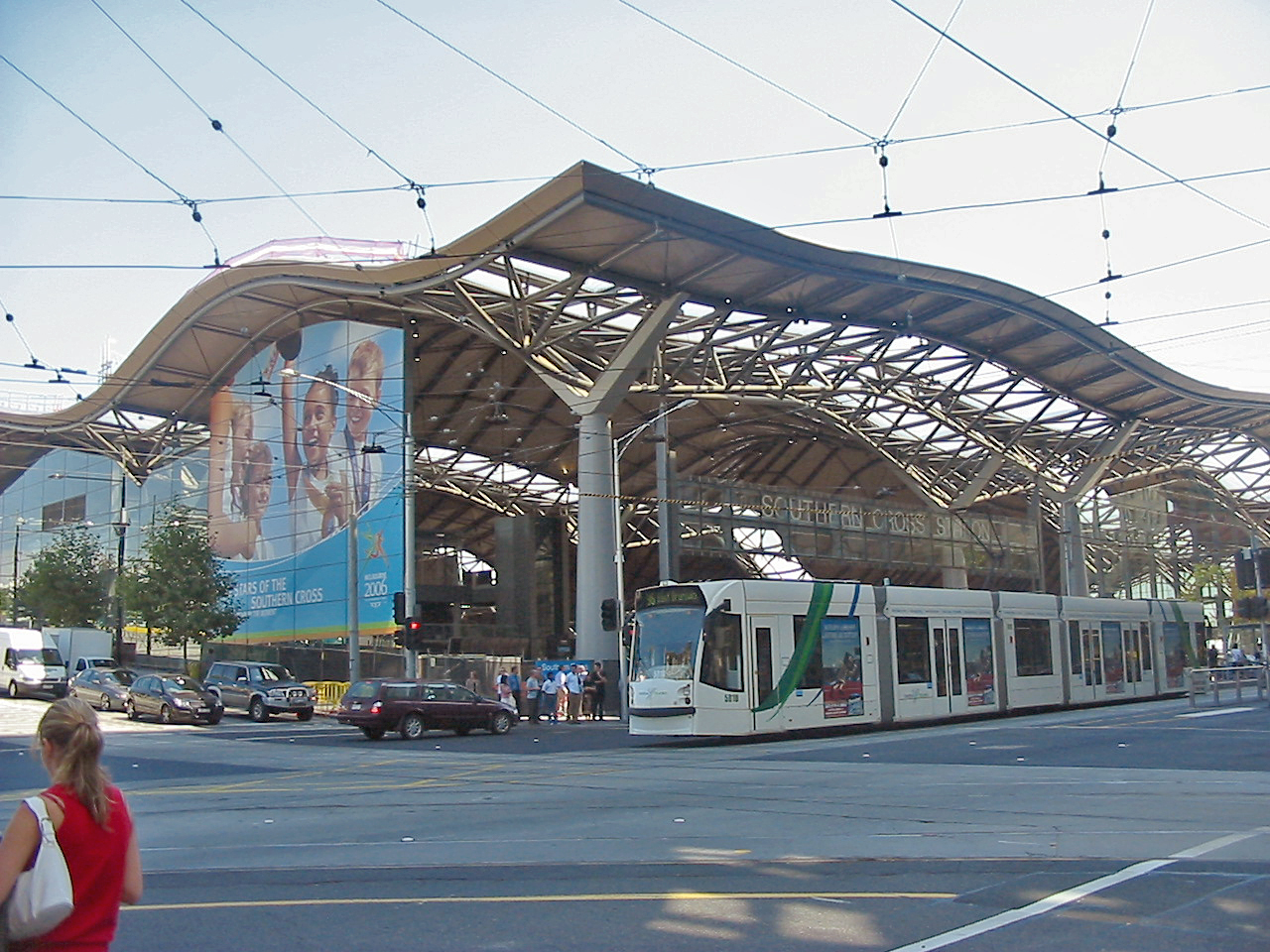
Southern Cross station, Melbourne; completed 2006.

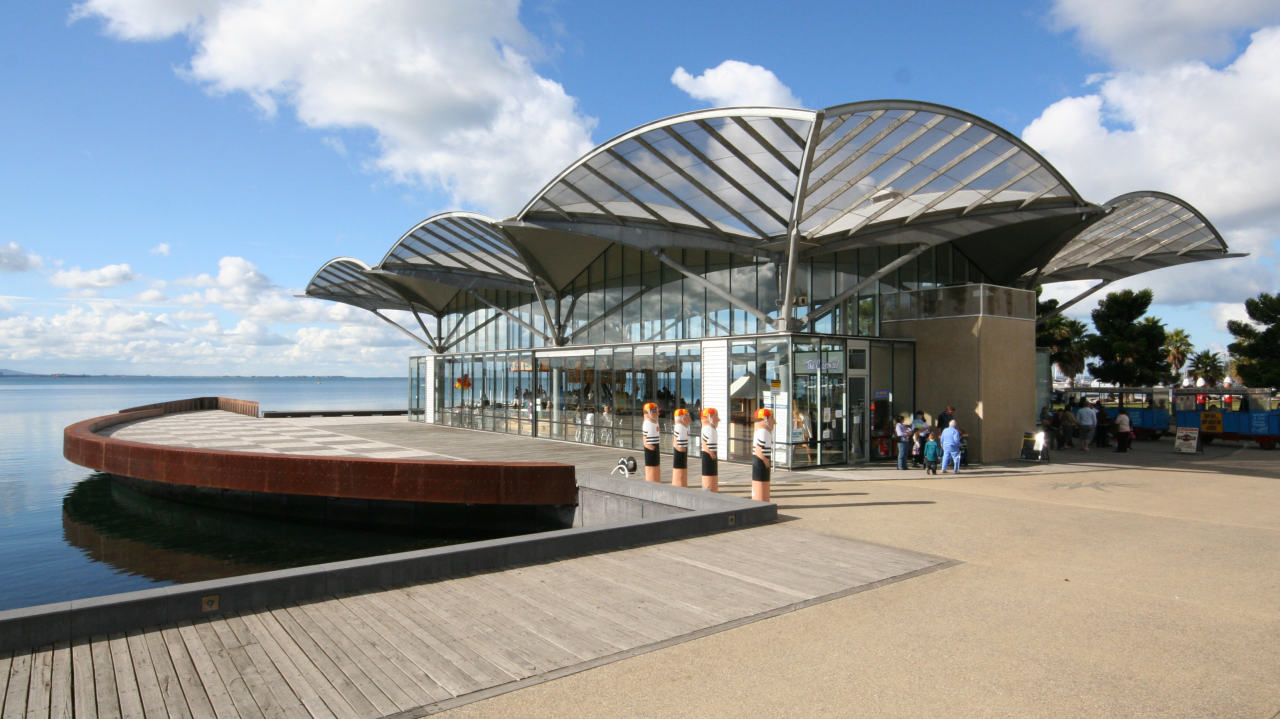
Carousel Pavilion, Geelong; completed 2006.

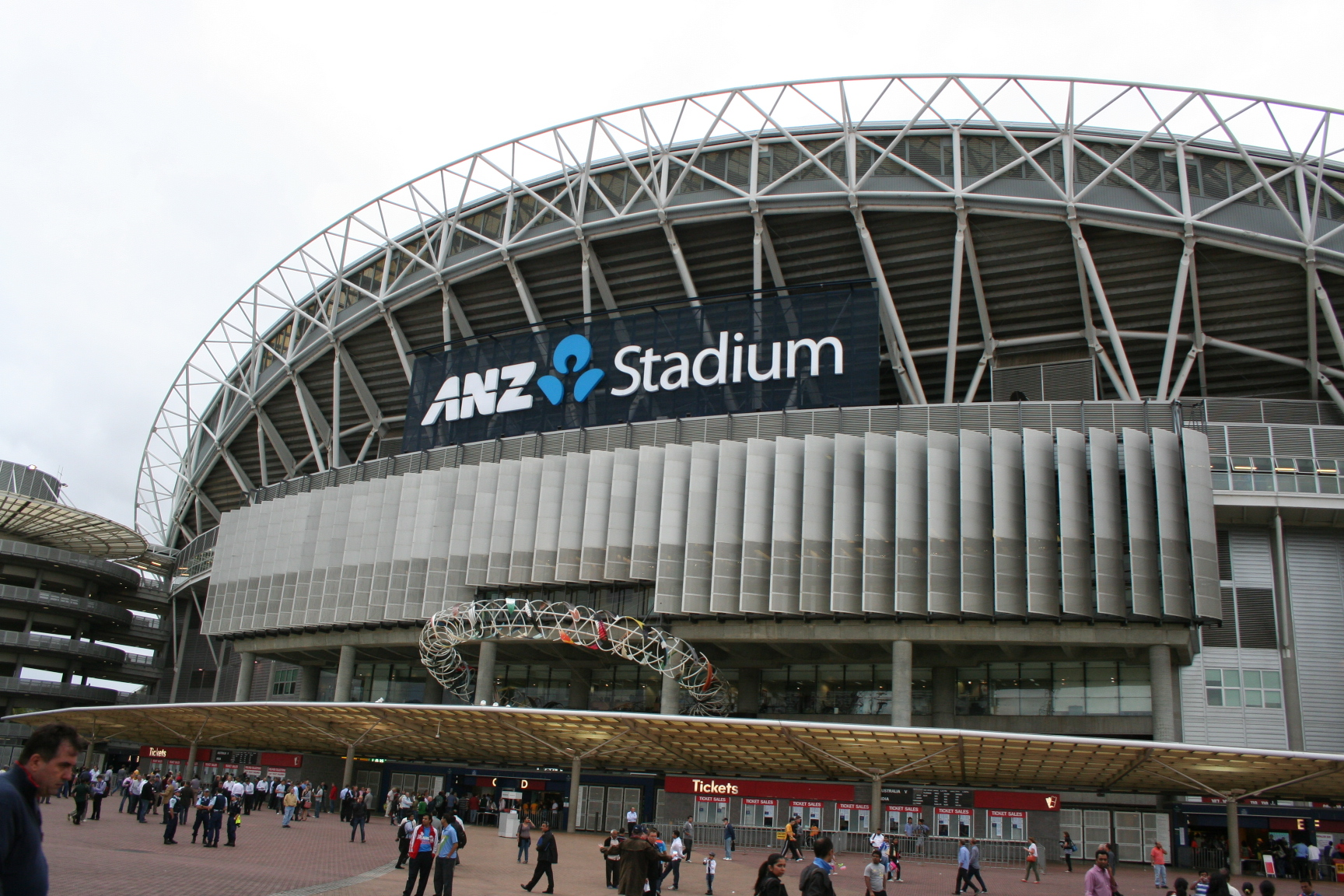
Stadium Australia, Sydney Olympic Park. Completed 1999

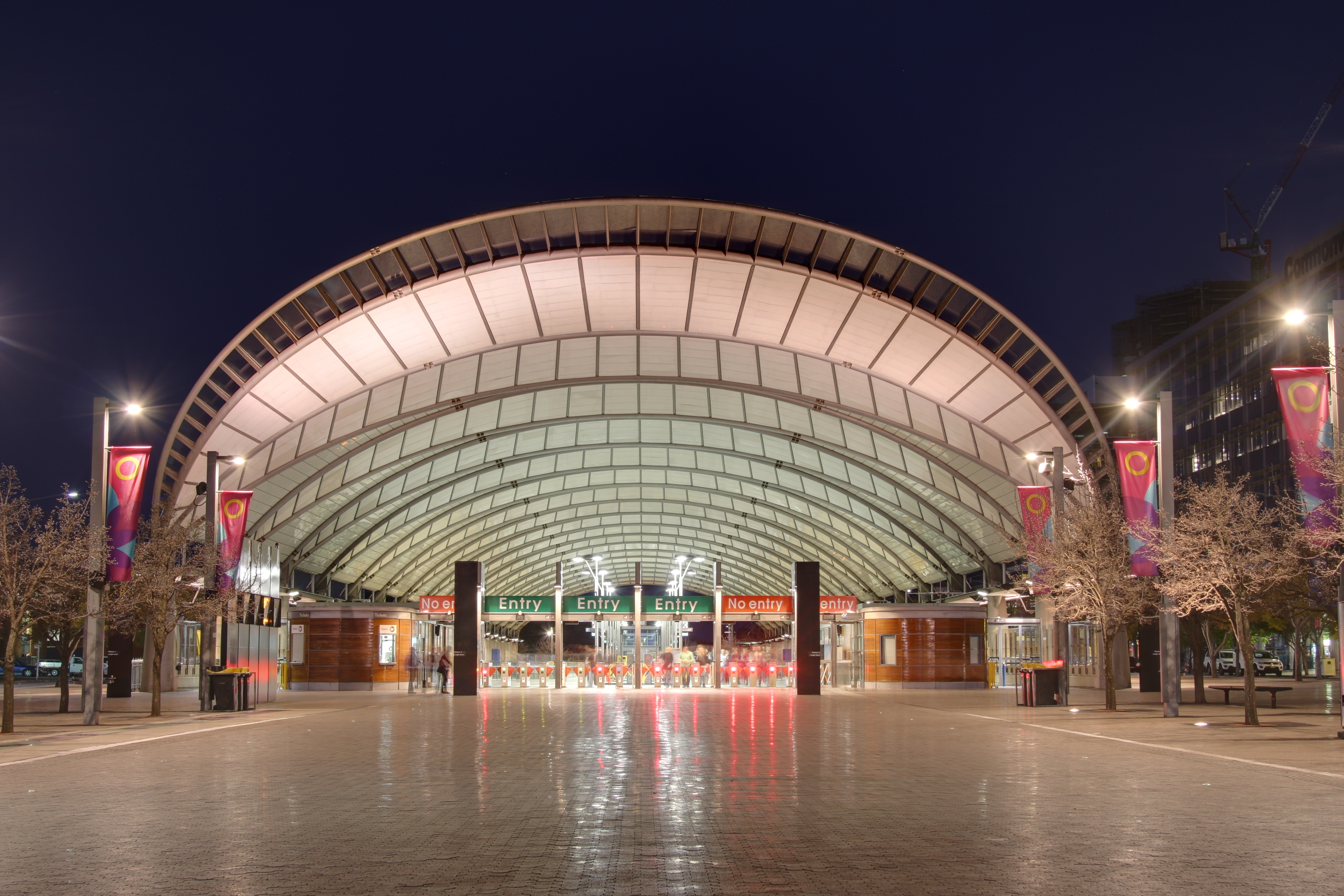
Olympic Park railway station, Sydney. Competed 1998

=== Sustainable ===
Notable examples in Australia include: 60L (Melbourne); CH2 (Melbourne); K2 Apartments (Windsor, Victoria); Dunc Gray Velodrome (Sydney); Forest EcoCentre (Tasmania); Rozak House (Noonamah, Northern Territory).

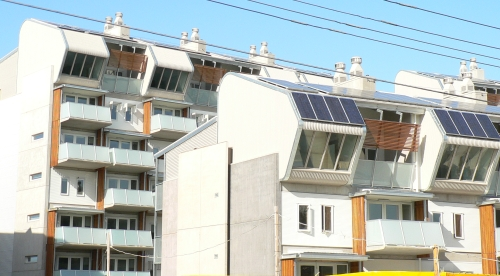
K2 Apartments. Windsor, Victoria. Completed 2006. Highly visible solar panels, prominent natural ventilators and use of natural materials.

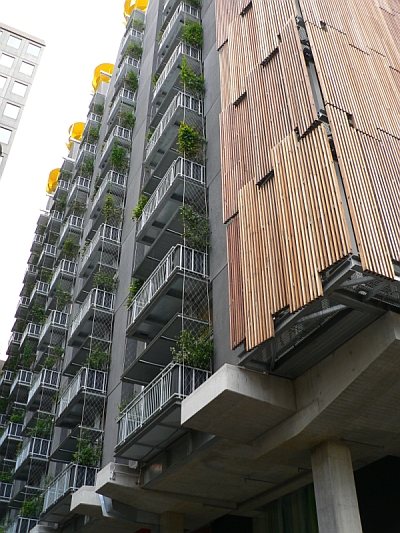
Council House 2. Little Collins Street, Melbourne. Completed 2006. World's first 6 star green rating building features louvered facade, natural and recycled materials, solar panels and thermal mass cooling.

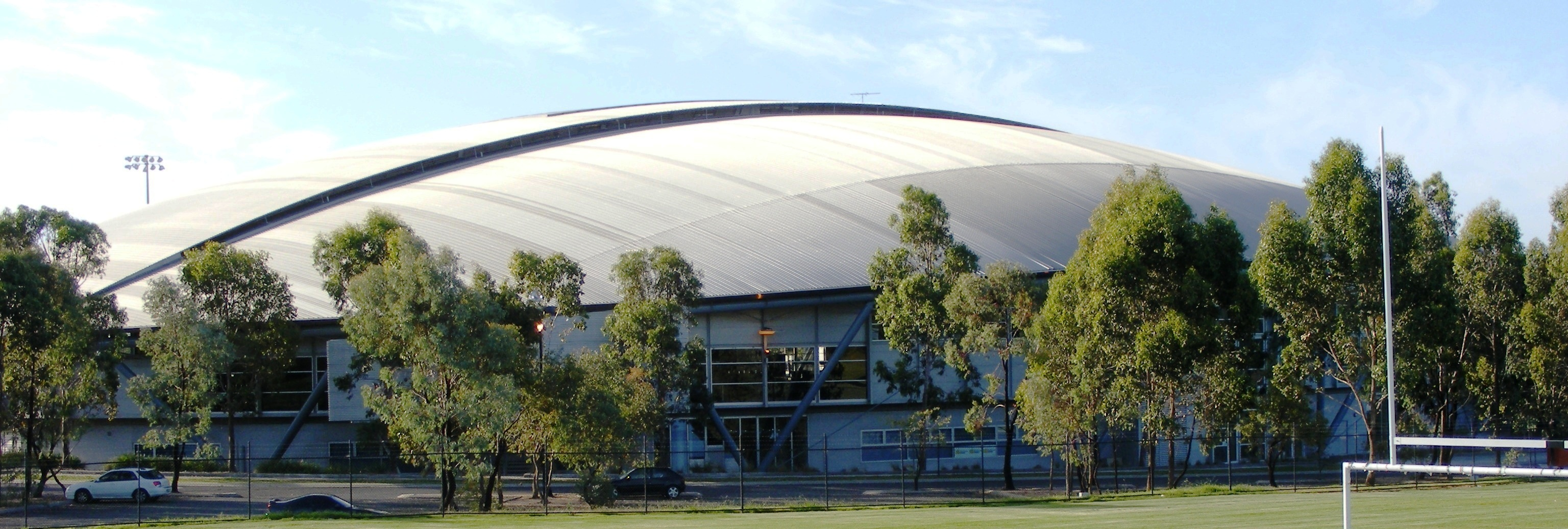
Dunc Gray Velodrome

=== Green building ===
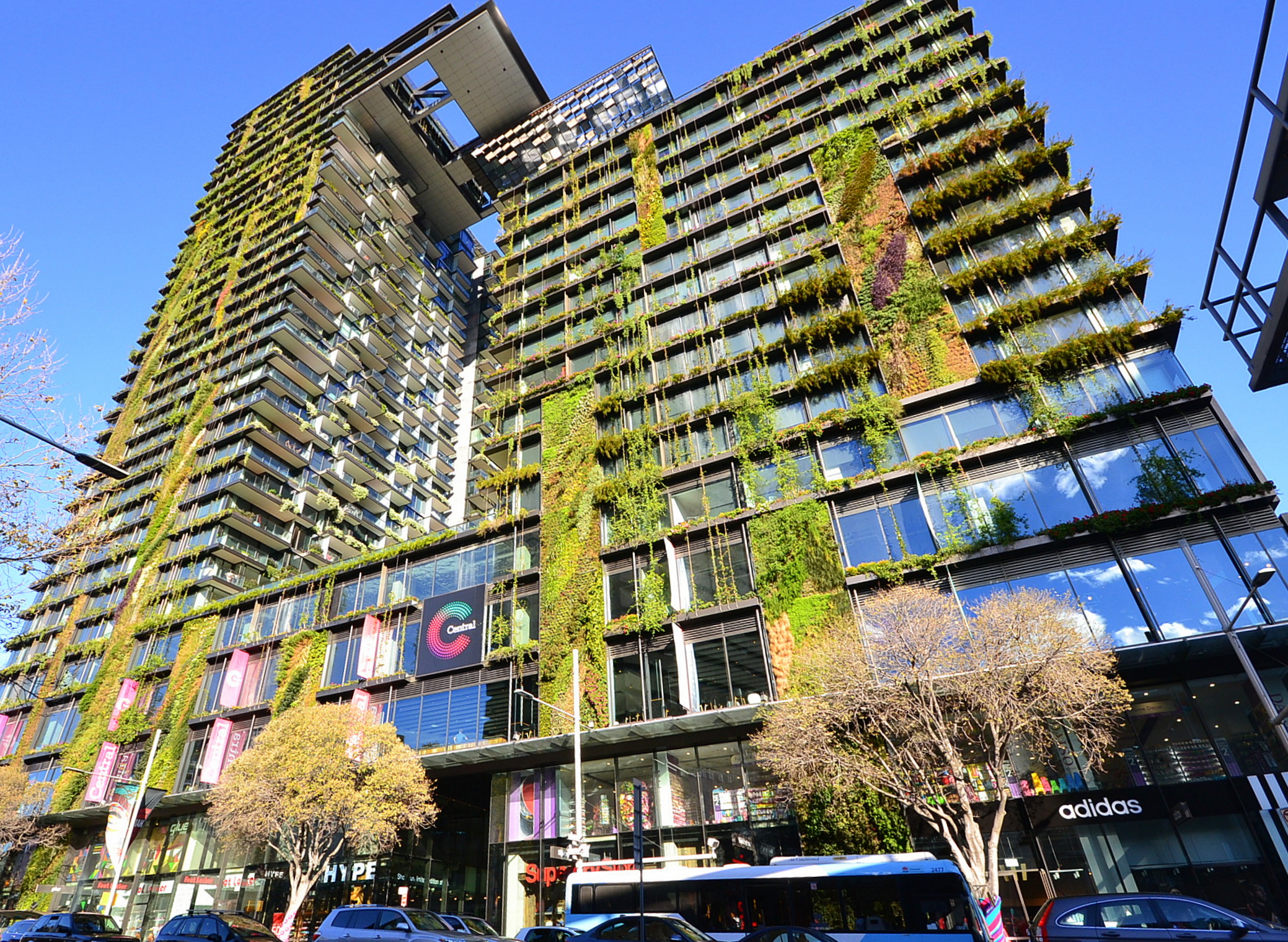
One Central Park, Sydney

=== Modern ===
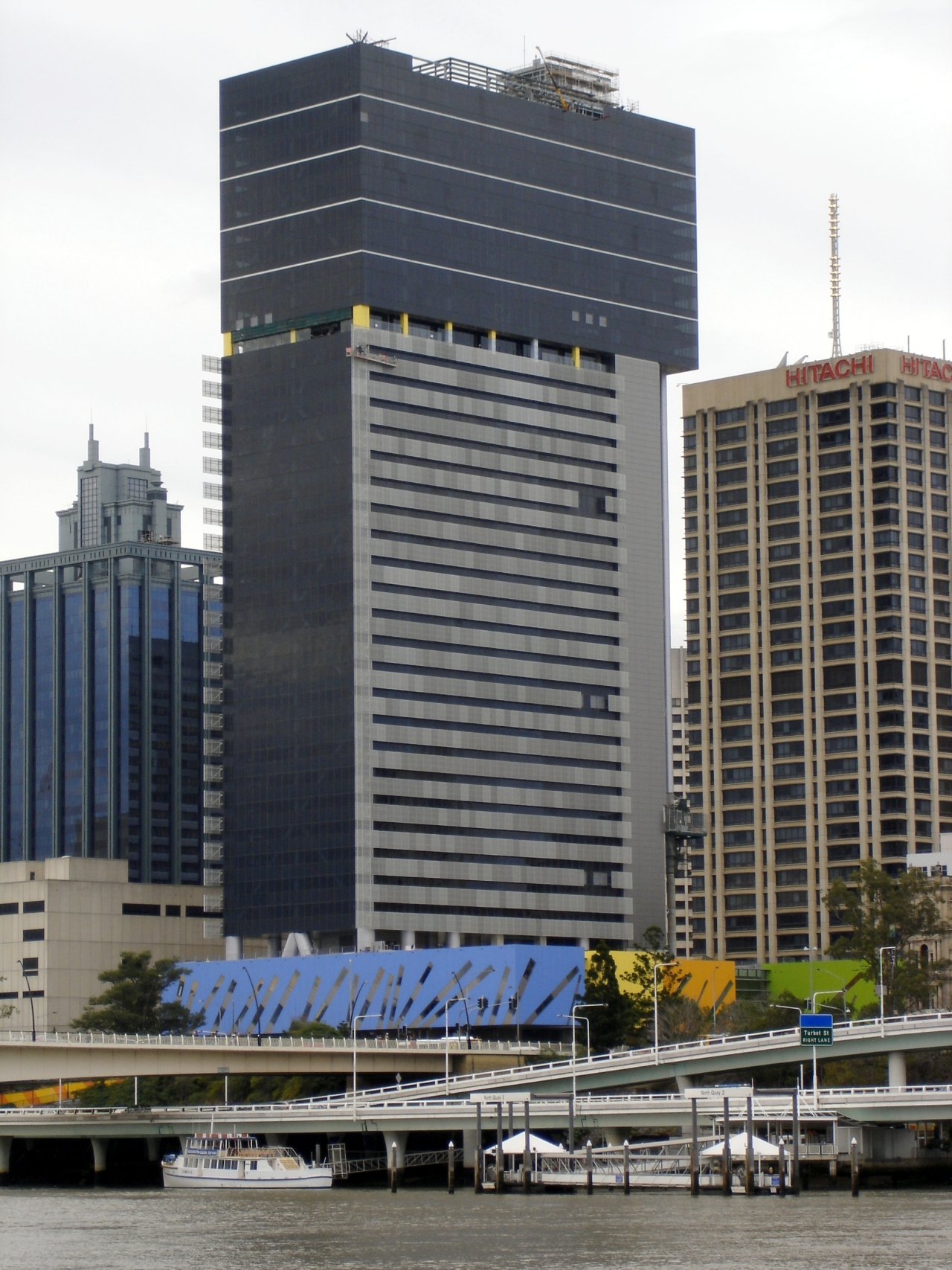
Brisbane Square. Brisbane; completed 2006.

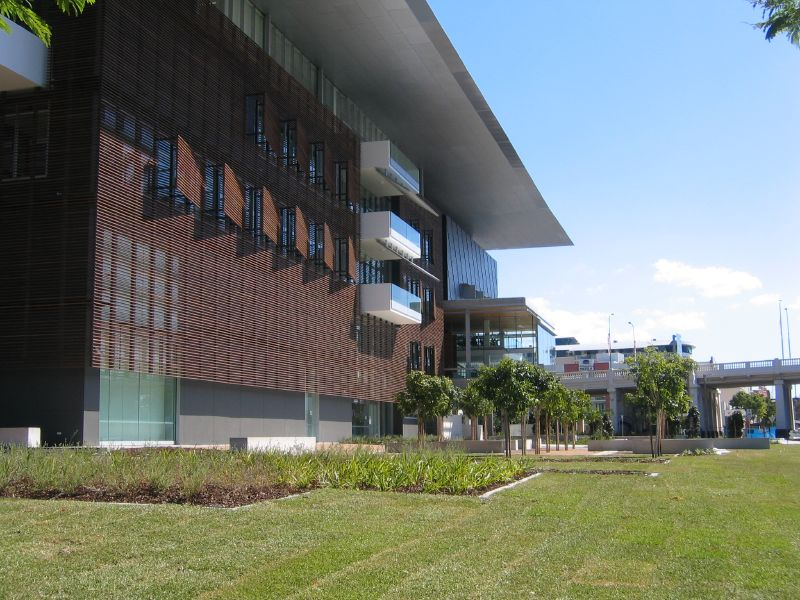
Queensland Gallery of Modern Art. Brisbane; completed 2008.

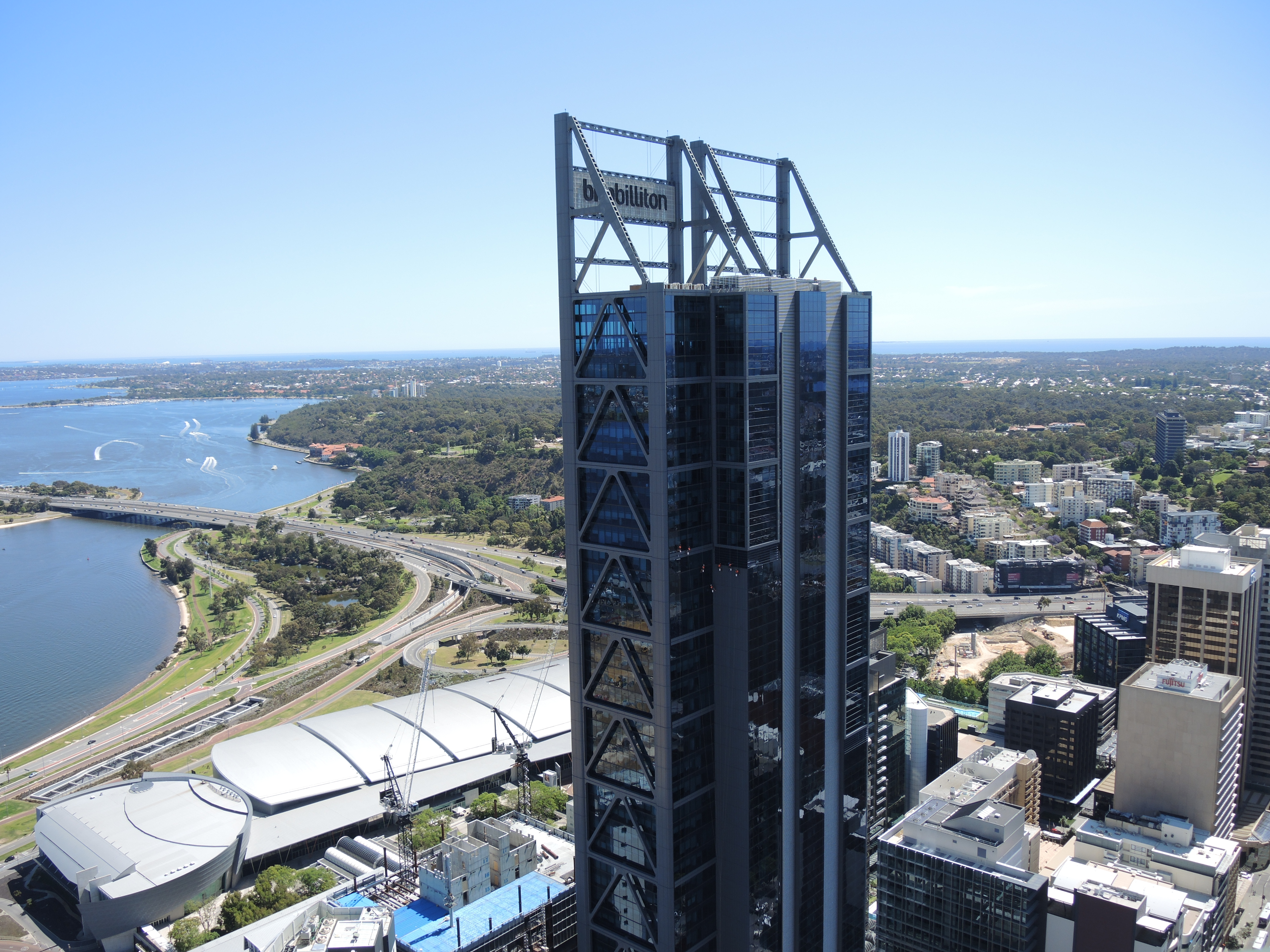
Brookfield Place, Perth, completed 2012.

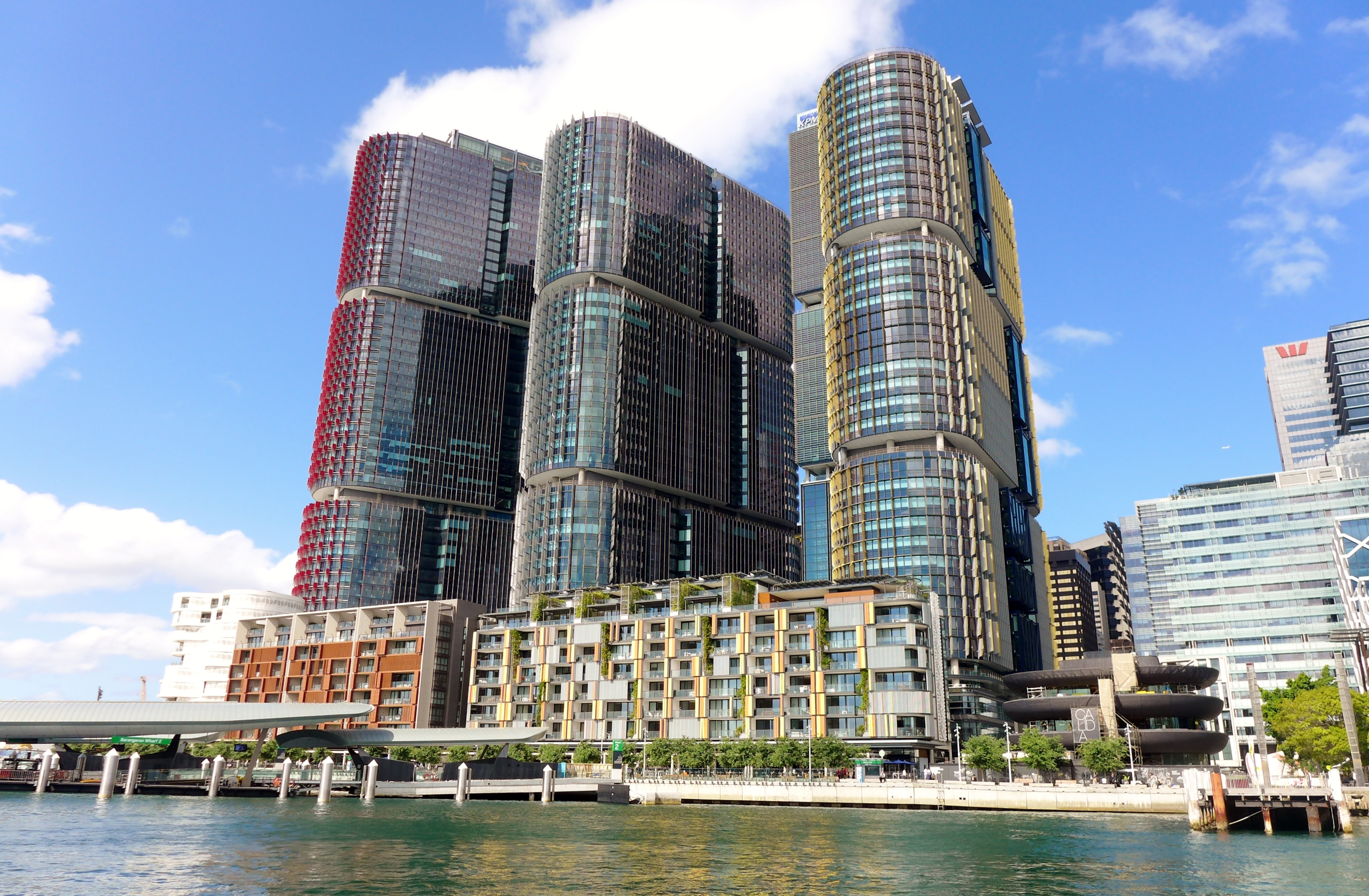
International Towers Sydney, 2017

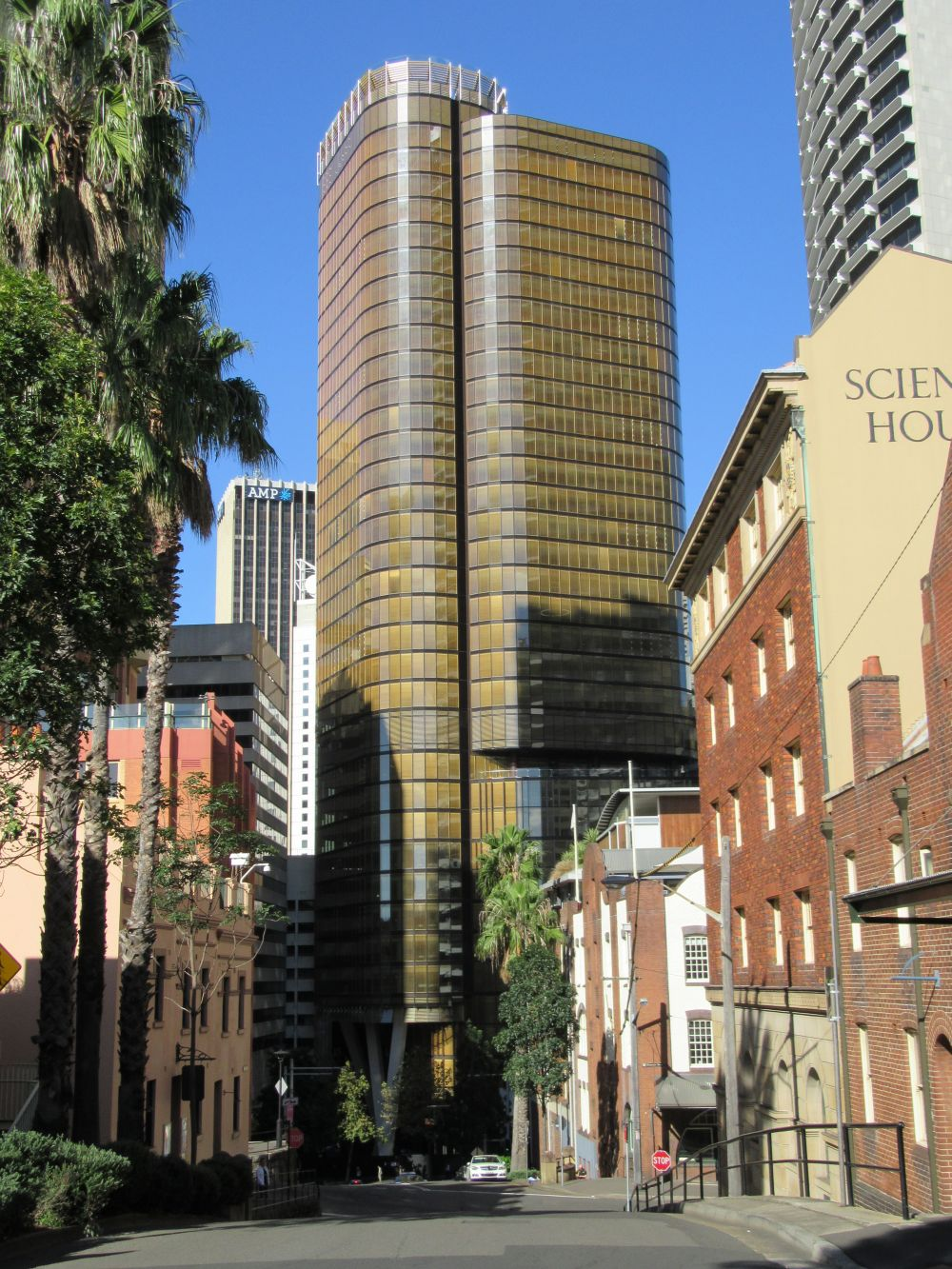
200 George Street, Sydney, 2016

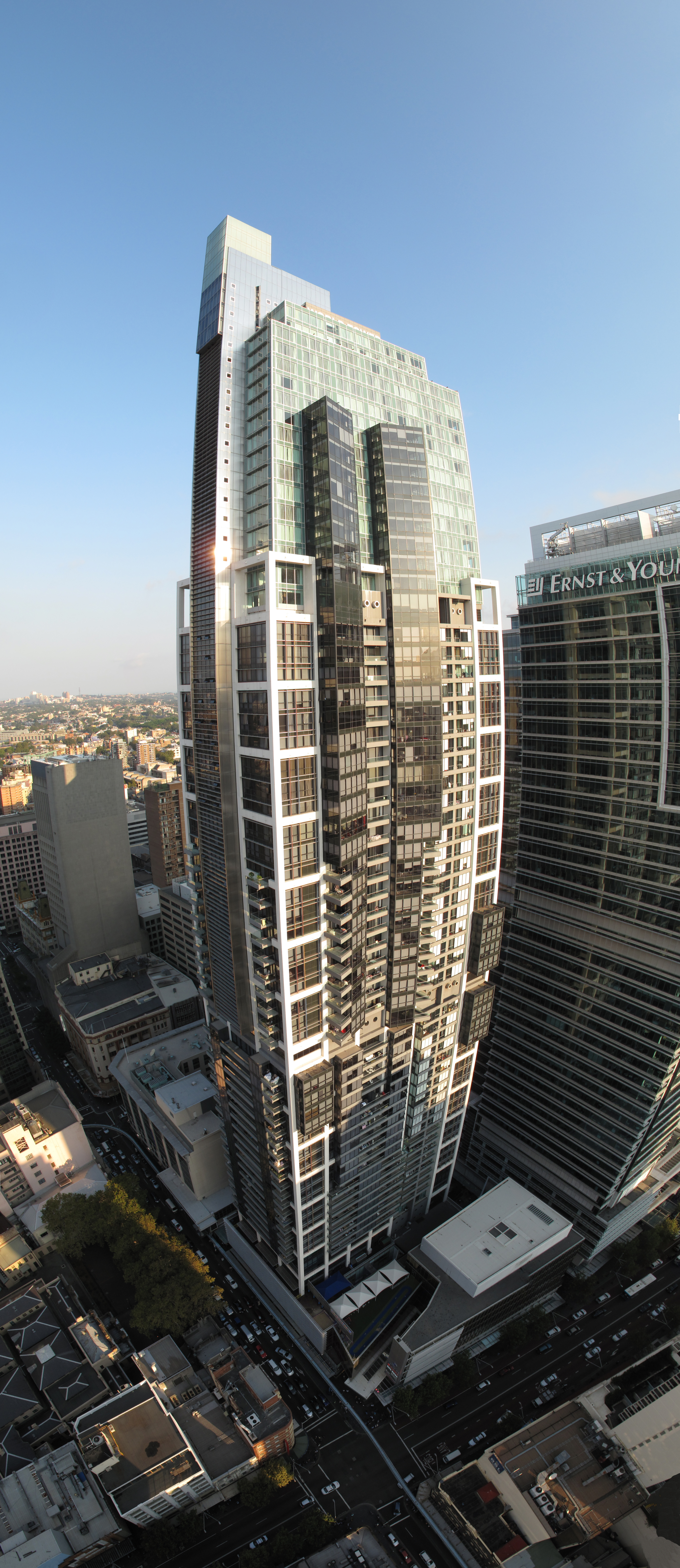
World Square, Sydney. 2005

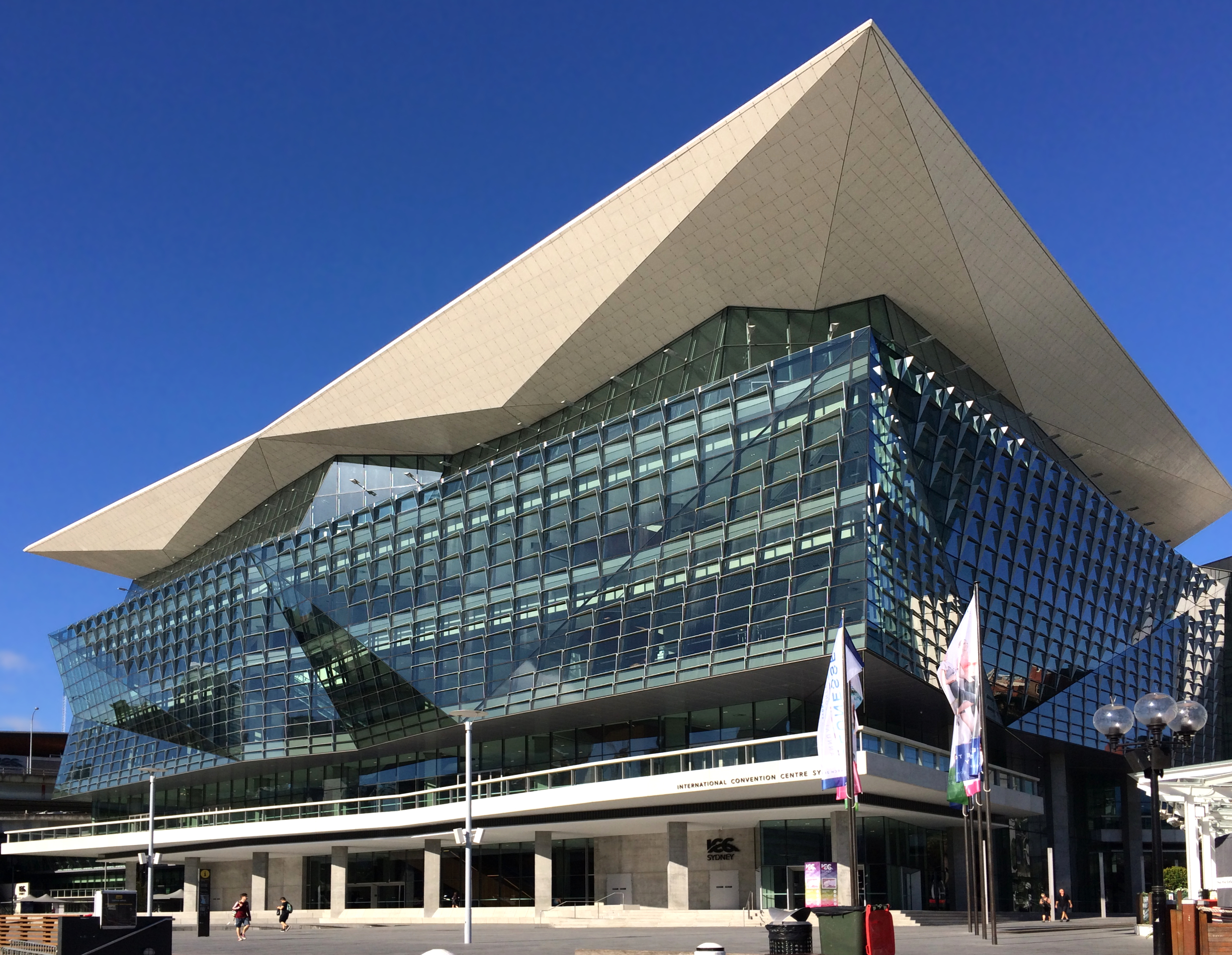
International Convention Centre Sydney. Completed 2017

== See also ==
- List of Australian architects
- List of architectural styles

== Bibliography ==
- Apperly, Richard; Irving, Robert; Reynolds, Peter (1989). "A Pictorial Guide to Identifying Australian Architecture: Styles and Terms from 1788 to the Present," Angus & Robertson.
- Ulrike Laule, Rolf Toman, Achim Bednorz - Architecture of the Middle Ages - Background to the Gothic Revival style.
- George Wilkie - Building Your Own Home - Section on Architectural Styles
- https://web.archive.org/web/20091024003216/http://geocities.com/asiedydd/styles.htm
- https://www.canberrahouse.com.au/organic.html
- http://www.wiki.jeremymacpherson.net/index.php?title=Research_Guide_1:_Buildings#Key_Architectural_Styles
- sydneyarchitecture.com Chronology of Styles in Australian Architecture- https://web.archive.org/web/20140908110249/http://sydneyarchitecture.com/STYLES/search-style.htm
