= Masonic Hall, York =

Heritage listed building in York, Western Australia

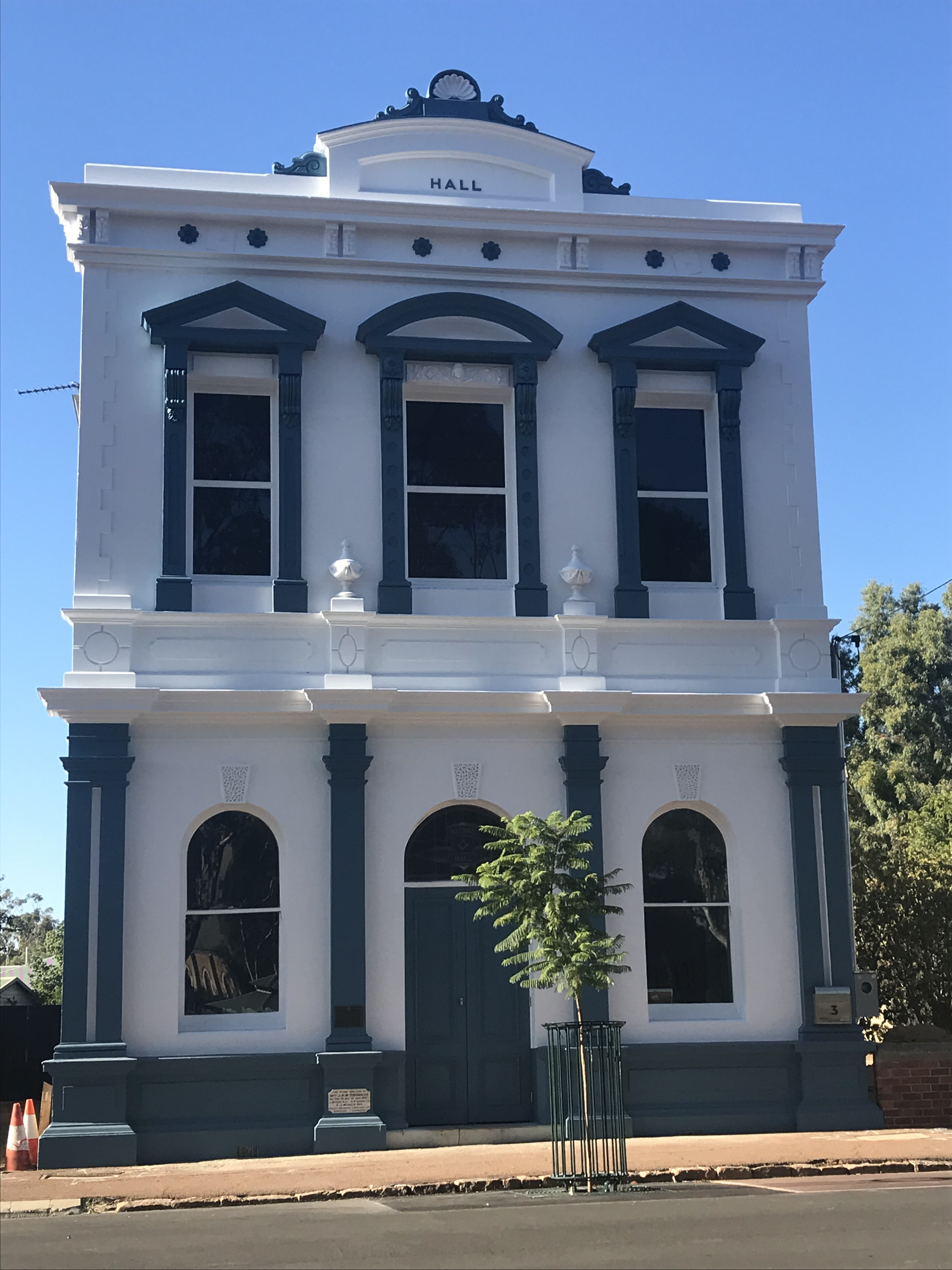
- Masonic Hall, York

- Location within Western Australia

General information
- Architectural style: Victorian Academic Classical
- Location: Joacquina Street, York, York, Western Australia
- Coordinates: 31.8893°S 116.7615°E
- Construction started: 1887
- Renovated: 1927, 2019

Design and construction
- Architecture firm: Wright & Paterson

The Masonic Hall, York, Western Australia, constructed in 1887, is believed to be the oldest surviving lodge building in Western Australia. It was constructed by the Manchester Unity of Oddfellows in York and was originally called "Oddfellows Hall". The building is in Victorian Academic Classical style.

== Subdivision ==
In York, in 1885, part of Avon Locations X and Y on the south side of South Street and owned by merchant John Henry Monger Jnr was subdivided. Location Y was traversed by the Eastern Railway line, then under construction, and the York station yard was located within the new subdivision. Already on the land was the Sisters of Mercy convent and school, on South Street, and the York Mechanic's Institute on Avon Terrace (where the Town Hall is now situated). The property was acquired by a syndicate taking advantage of the railway extension, comprising Stephen Parker, James Grave and Maitland Broun. The Imperial Hotel was constructed in 1886.

== Prior to Construction of the hall ==
Prior to constructing Oddfellows Hall, the Oddfellows held their meetings at the Castle Hotel. The meetings were on the closest Thursday evening to the full moon so members could make their way home with little difficulty in the dark.

After negotiating from 1882 to buy a property from George Lilley, the Lodge of Oddfellows bought the property on which the hall now stands from Stephen Parker, James Grave and Maitland Broun for ten shillings on 11 April 1887. This was described as a gift from James Grave, who was a Perth adherent to the Oddfellows.

"The late nineteenth century was the heyday of benevolent societies and the Oddfellows were among the strongest of the societies existing in York at the time along with the Methodist temperance group, the Rechabites, who had their own hall in Howick Street, and the Freemasons Lodge."

== Construction ==
Architect James William Wright of Paterson & Wright produced a design for a "substantial and handsome structure". The successful tenderer for the building contract was James Butterley, quoting £1,320 18s.

Work commenced at the end of February 1887.

The foundation stone was laid by Mrs J R M Thomson on 18 May 1887.

The building had two storeys, consisting of a public hall available for hire below and lodge meeting rooms above.

== Opening ==
The hall was opened on 14 December 1887. "The building is a credit to the town and speaks well for the enterprising spirit of the Oddfellows of the district and the skill of the builder."

Celebrations took place at the Imperial Hotel followed by a ball in the hall.

The York Freemasons also wanted to use the hall as their meeting room but were not able to do so immediately because the proprietor of the Castle Hotel refused to allow the York Freemasons to break their lease. The York Freemasons rented the hall for £24 a year from 1891.

== Heyday of the hall ==
The hall was used for York's major social, musical and theatrical events until the Town Hall opened in 1911.

== Sale to the Freemasons ==
In 1926, the Oddfellows in York had reduced in numbers and the hall was sold to the Freemasons for £1,000.

The Freemasons replaced the window above the door with their own symbols and removed the word "ODDFELLOWS" from the name of the building.

The hall continued to be used for a range of social events including Coolbaroo Club functions.

== Damage ==
In 1987, the hall began to subside when water seeped from a new septic drain next to the Town Hall. Tie bars were installed to secure the building.

== Into private hands ==
The Freemasons sold the building in 2018. The new owners have restored the building and the hall is now used as an art gallery with residence above.

== Heritage listings ==
The building is on the Shire Register (31 December 1995), National Trust Classified (1 April 1984), and on the Register of the National Estate (21 March 1978).
