= Settlers House, York =

Coordinates: 31°53′20″S 116°46′05″E

Settlers House
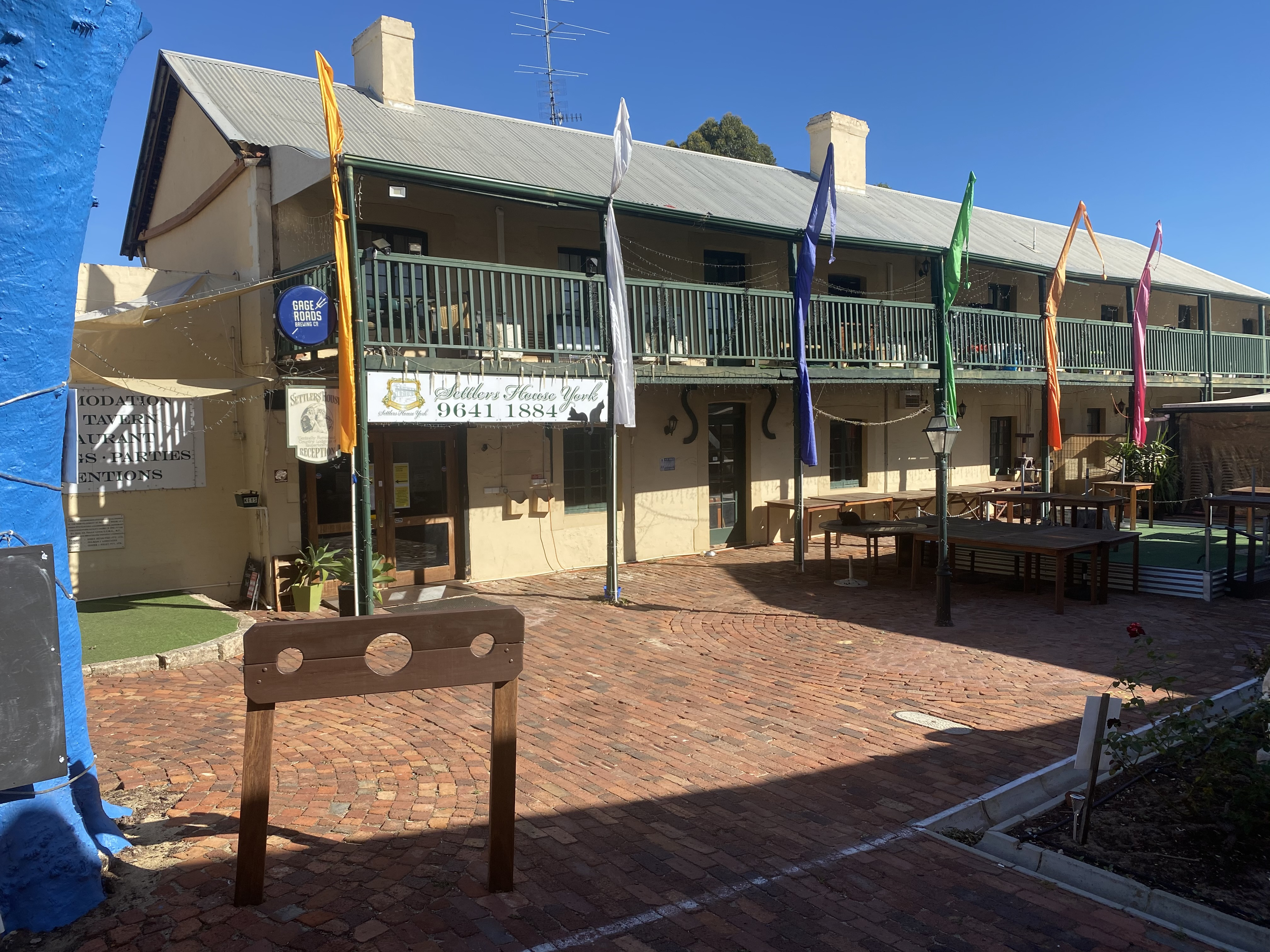
- Interactive map of the Settlers House area
- Former names: AE Pyke Temperance Hotel, Inkpen Building

General information
- Location: 125 Avon Terrace, York, Western Australia
- Construction started: 1861
- Renovated: post 1972

References
- York municipal inventory

Settlers House is a historic hotel in the centre of York, Western Australia.

== First owner ==
The first owner of the land was John Taylor, a farmer of Yangedin. He paid £10 for a Crown Grant on 25 July 1855.

Next door, to the north, was “a house containing 6 rooms, blacksmith’s shop and other premises” leased to blacksmith Henry Stevens by Solomon Cook.

== Construction ==
Henry Stevens, an expiree who had arrived as a convict in 1852, bought the Settlers property in November 1860 for £40. He was also a building contractor and he appears to have constructed or commenced construction of the old section of Settlers building in 1861.

From 1863, Henry Stevens frequently used ticket-of-leave labour, so it is likely that some of the building was convict built.

== Use as an inn ==
The building was used as a travellers’ inn, with plenty of space between the building and Avon Terrace for coaches. In the forecourt was the town's public well where residents could obtain their water supplies and water their horses. This was the likely terminus for Thomas Horton's coachline from Guildford to York.

In 1875 the property was bought by Mary Craig for £462, and the right hand side probably became her residence until she died in 1891.

== Office for the Eastern Districts Chronicle ==
In 1877, the left hand side of the building was rented to George Inkpen, who ran the first newspaper in the district, the Eastern Districts Chronicle. The editorial offices were on the top floor and the printing plant was situated on the ground floor (where the bar now is). The Eastern Districts Chronicle continued to publish until 1959.

== Movements and shops ==
In 1892, the Craig family sold the property for £3,000. At the time of sale, it was described as "a terrace of houses".

In April 1899, Mrs AE Pyke (Charlotte), who had run a "Temperance Hotel" in South Street, moved the business to the Settlers building and occupied the accommodation section on the right hand side. She moved to Dinsdale's Shoe Emporium in 1909 and George Ding moved his boarding house business from Penola House at 156 Avon terrace into the premises.

In 1906, a row of shops was constructed along the front. One business run from there was the Regal Tea Rooms run by A W Pyke. A variety of businesses still operate from these shops.

The Inkpen family purchased the building in 1929 and it became known as the Inkpen Building.

== Restoration ==
After the Eastern Districts Chronicle closed down, the left side of the building was empty but the right side continued to be used as a boarding house. Some interior walls were damaged during the 1968 Meckering earthquake and the whole building became empty. The building was purchased by interior designer Eric Turton in 1972 and restored to how it was in 1875. One of his first jobs was to cut back the overgrown vines which obscured the view of the building.

In 1981, Turton sold to Peter Briggs who had also purchased and established the York Motor Museum. Briggs extended the old building back towards Howick St.

== Tavern ==
Settlers House continues today as a tavern with a bar and internal and external dining areas, and is known for its live music.
