= Joseph Pyke =

Australian shoemaker (1831–1910)

Joseph Pyke (1831–1910) was a shoemaker who settled in York, Western Australia in 1857 with his wife, Elizabeth, and became a prominent store keeper and land owner in the town, developing the first street-front shops, and playing a significant role in town affairs.

== Arrival of the Pykes ==
Joseph Henry Pyke was from Brunswick Place, Reading, Berkshire, England. He and his wife, Elizabeth, arrived in Western Australia in 1855 as free settlers. Joseph Pyke was a cordwainer (shoemaker) and his wife Elizabeth was a boot binder, who settled in York almost immediately. (Note: He advertised in February 1878 that he had been in "residence in York (for) a period of over 21 years". In 1861, Stephen Stanley Parker sold a quarter of an acre in Blandstown to Pyke for £50..Pyke co-signed an open letter to Dr McCoy in November 1866, indicating he had become a town notable by that time.)

== Argument with Samuel Craig ==
In February 1867, Pyke had an argument with Samuel Craig, owner of the Castle Hotel. Craig had objected to Pyke "entering his parlor, alleging that he was too filthy, and that his customers objected to him. Pyke disputing the truth of this filthy accusation, an altercation ensued, when Craig, finding that Pyke was more than a match for him with his tongue, had recourse to the argumentum baculinium" (i.e. physical force). Craig was fined 20 shillings and ordered to pay costs.

== York Municipality ==
In 1871, Pyke became a councillor of the York Municipality, and eventually became chairman. (Note: He proposed a motion at a public meeting on 31 October 1871 regarding education.) However, he was not always treated with respect. The York correspondent to the Herald said in July 1872:

The farce of electing members to assist a permanent and irresponsible government is so utterly ludicrous that I treat the whole things as a joke, and would as soon vote for Mr Pyke the shoemaker, as for Mr Monger the storekeeper or Mr Parker the miller.

In July 1872, Pyke would have been embarrassed by his "six roomed home" (Note: on York Building Allotment 184.) and other properties being advertised for sale by the sheriff pursuant to a mortgagee sale.

== Pyke bids for contracts ==
Pyke continued to bid for and win contracts such as to convey mail from York to Yangedin, the contract as pound-keeper, and Collector (of cart and carriage licence fees) for the York Municipal Council, earning 5%. In this latter role, he won a court case enabling licence fees to be collected by the Municipal Council when the Roads Board had also granted a cart and carriage licence. He successfully defended a claim that he had not properly accounted for his licence fees, himself convening a meeting of ratepayers to justify his position.

In his capacity as pound-keeper, he once unsuccessfully prosecuted a farmer Robert Anderson for taking his horses from the pound, and he was ordered to pay the costs of the legal proceedings. Pyke became an auctioneer and general commission agent in August 1879. He took the contract to empty the closets of York and was prosecuted for bribing prisoners with tobacco if they would carry out this work. He also became bailiff of the Local Court.

== Trip to Melbourne ==
Pyke travelled to Melbourne in April 1877.

== Trouble with the Treasurer ==
In July 1877, The Treasurer of the Municipal Council alleged that Joseph Pyke had not properly accounted for money he had received as Collector. This allegation caused a sensation at a meeting of ratrepayers. A discrepancy was found which was regarded by the newspaper as trifling, and something which would have been put right on his next round of collection, and it was considered that the Treasurer's “zeal had exceeded his judgment” Unfortunately bitter feelings resulted from this.

== More court cases ==
Pyke was often in the court, usually claiming money owed to him. He frequently lost his cases. For example, in September 1878, he charged John Lockwood with stealing a horse which had been rented and not returned, and lost after Lockwood paid for the horse.

== Temperance ==
Pyke was a Wesleyan and "an energetic worker in the noble cause of Temperance". Pyke was secretary to the building committee which constructed the Rechabite Hall at the end of 1877. Pyke was a member of the Reform League (York Branch) which sought ministerial responsibility for the colony. He became a Councillor of the York Town Council. (Note: Refer to Western Australian Times 29 November 1878, p.2; Eastern Districts Chronicle 22 November 1882, p.5; Herald 25 November 1882, p.1.)

== Move to more commodious premises ==
He described himself in October 1877 as a “bootmaker and leather-cutter” when he advertised that he was moving to "more commodious premises" in Avon Tce "next door to Mr Hoops" (Note: Richard Hoops.) (opposite the post office). Pyke had entered into a contract to buy these premises from Hoops. Pyke was also buying sandalwood and advertised: "every description of Colonial Produce bought, sold or exchanged". This included trying to purchase 10,000 opossum skins. In July 1878, Pyke opened a “NEW STORE”, which was a "general store" where he sold such items as "Oilmens stores, Best Teas and Sugars, Green Groceries, wearing Apparel, Shoemaker’s Grindery, Kerosene, Rugs and Blankets, Tobacco etc etc". He started advertising as a “Bootmaker and Leather Cutter”. His advertisements included the words “Small profits and quick returns”. In August 1879, Pyke became a Commission Agent, and advertised his intention to hold “WEEKLY SALES at AUCTION”, He was looking for every kind of "Colonial Produce", skins, shingles and timber, horses and vehicles. He was one of those who called for a public meeting to consider the best means of abolishing the bye-law with reference to driving horses abreast on the roads. In 1882, Pyke took the unusual step of writing to the paper. He said I am "not usually in the habit of airing my opinions in print; as my time is occupied in a very different way". He took the side of sandalwood cutters against squatters who were grumbling about the sandalwood cutters having hobbled horses on their properties and drinking the water. Pyke employed 57 ticket-of-leave men on occasions from 1863 to 1882, including many shoemakers.

== Land owner ==
The property to the north of Settlers, (Note: York Town Lot 18.) was transferred to Pyke in 1883, and then in 1885 he constructed "conveniently sized rooms, which are well suited for offices". This was to "radically alter the look of the main street" because "Pyke had decided to construct the front of his shop right up against the property line and build a verandah over the public sidewalk".

== Contestants Joseph Pyke and Frank Craig ==
The Inquirer and Commercial News reported on a meeting held on 7 December 1887:

Our municipal Election held here recently was very tame, as there was no opposition – a fact greatly to be lamented. Mr F Craig and Mr Pyke stood for the Mayoralty, but as the latter gentleman declined to demand a poll upon a show of hands being declared against him, Mr Craig was declared by the Returning Officer duly elected. Mr Pyke was of the opinion that Mr Craig was not eligible for the seat, as he had neglected the usual formalities in a proper manner. Mr Pyke also stood for a Councillor, and for that seat he enjoyed a "walk over", as also did Mr HJ Horley. At the monthly meeting of the Council held on Friday last, Mr Pyke refused to allow himself to be sworn in, as he maintained the Mayor’s election was illegal. The Mayor informed Mr Pyke that as he declined to be sworn in he hoped he would not interfere with the business of the meeting.

In the following February, there was a contested election for Mayor which Frank Craig won convincingly.

In 1888, Pyke had the privilege of placing a "hermetically sealed" bottle containing a list of parishioners and some silver and copper coins common in the colony under the foundation stone of what is now the Uniting Church, York, Western Australia.

In February 1889, Pyke bought the property on which stood the mill that had been constructed by Solomon Cook. (Note: Town Lot 4. This lot remained in his name until 1917, and during that time the mill was demolished.)

== Pyke takes advantage of the gold rush ==
In 1892, Pyke started a business running teams and drivers from the "York Exchange" with goods and machinery to the Goldfields. An advertisement for this was signed by "Joseph Pyke" of the "York Livery Stables". In 1889, Pyle advertised “gold digger requisites” to those on their way to the goldfields and described himself as "auctioneer, general store keeper, commission agent, boot manufacturer etc etc etc".

== Travel ==
In April 1889, Pyke went to England then the Eastern States, expecting to be away 10 months. He returned in March 1890. In 1890, there were celebrations because the House of Commons had passed the WA Enabling Act. Pyke hoisted a flag at his residence. In December 1890, Pyke stood unsuccessfully as a candidate for the Legislative Assembly against Stephen Parker and failed.

In 1901, there was a fire in Pyke's buildings on Avon Tce:

Mrs Hunter, the wife of the draper, was preparing a meal and a spark from the stove ignited the window blind. In an instant, the fire spread up the staircase and set the upper rooms ablaze. Speechless with excitement, Mrs Hunter entered the room where her husband was and fell to the floor. Mr Hunter, not knowing the cause, rushed outside and saw the smoke. He guided Mrs Hunter out of the building. He then went into the shop and removed the contents of the safe but was unable to save anything else.

Within a quarter of an hour, the roof fell in. Behind the building was an old shed which was next to Mrs Pyke’s Temperance Hotel, (Note: Now the old section of Settlers.) and next to that, the office of the Eastern Districts Chronicle.

Pyke’s old shop which was then occupied by Martin, the bootmaker, was burnt. The local insurance agent was William Dinsdale. One other business was destroyed, that of Messrs Crouch, the fruiterer.

== Death ==
Elizabeth Pyke died on 9 February 1893 and Joseph Pyke died on 11 February 1910.
