= John Smithies (disambiguation) =

John Smithies may refer to:

- John Smithies (1802–1872), Wesleyan missionary
- John J. Smithies (born 1954), founding director of the Australian Centre for the Moving Image

== See also ==
- Smithies (disambiguation)
