= Avon Terrace, York =

Street in York, Western Australia

Avon Terrace Western Australia
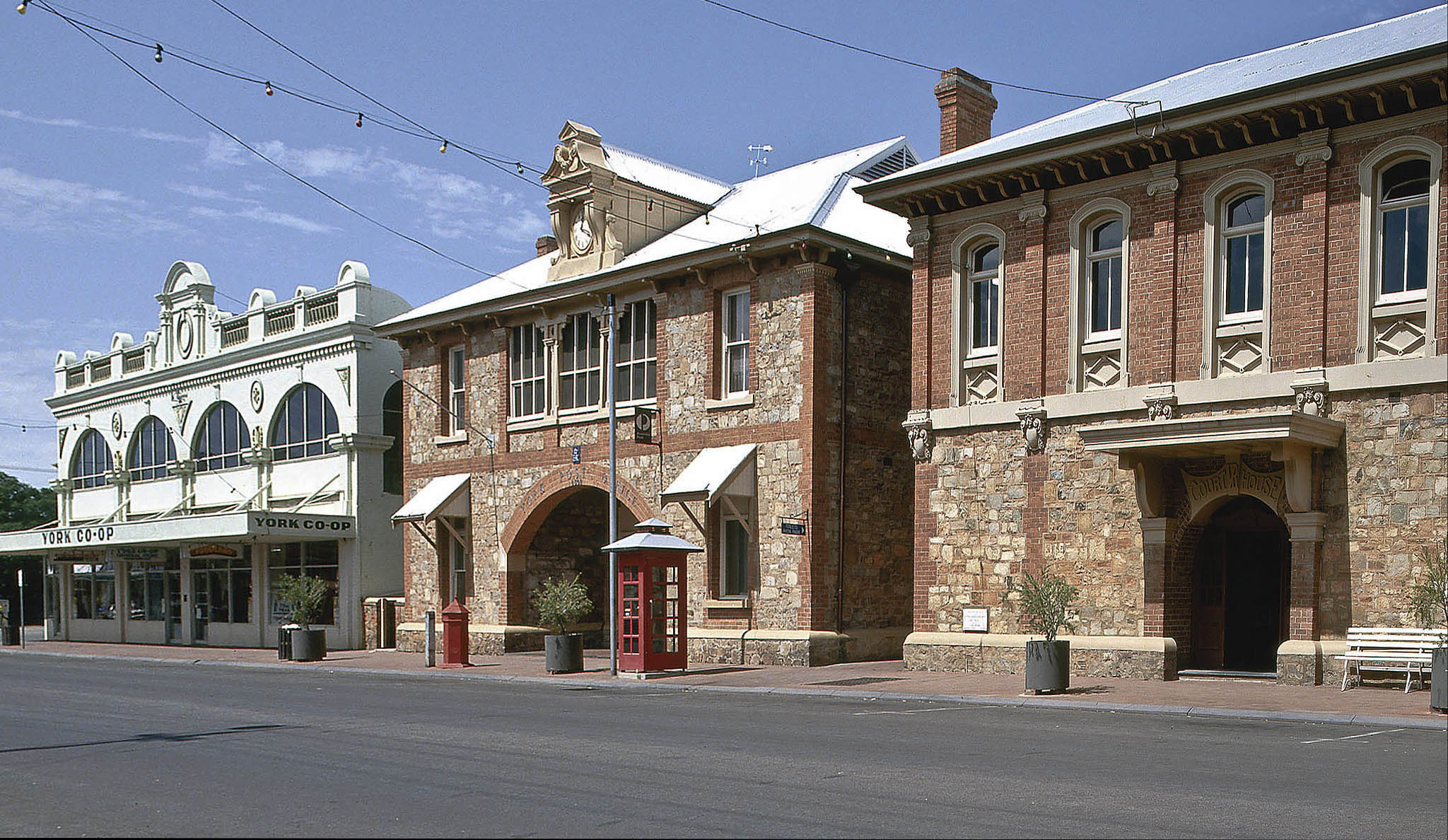
- Heritage buildings on the eastern side of Avon Terrace

General information
- Type: Street
- Length: 2.3 km (1.4 mi)

Major junctions

Avon Terrace is the main street of the town of York, Western Australia, and is lined with heritage buildings.

== Avon Terrace west side walking north from the Town Hall to Ford Street ==
- The Imperial Hotel (1886) was the first hotel to be built in York that adopted the new "Australian hotel" style in hotel design, with a dominant position on a main street corner block, high and ornate double verandahs and a main entrance onto the street. The building is in Victorian Filigree style.
- Saint building. This building appears to have been constructed prior to 1917 by the Wheeler family and was rented to Carl Bredhal (renovator). From 1918 it was owned by the Wansbrough family and rented to Harold Mercer, baker, who later became Mayor. From 1952, was a St John’s ambulance station, then a café for motor cycle enthusiasts. It is currently a private residence.
- The Community Resource Centre building was previously the office of Elders.
- Sargent’s Pharmacy. Obeithio Sargent built this pharmacy shop in 1904. On the parapet is a mortar and pestle. Sargent and his family lived upstairs and in the basement he had photographic studio. The decorative north window is the Western Gold Medal, which indicates that Obeithio Sargent obtained the highest marks in his final examinations as a pharmacist.
- The Castle Hotel (corner addition) (1905) is in Federation Filigree style, and was constructed by May Craig. The architect was William G Wolf, a several times bankrupt American architect who also designed His Majesty's Theatre in Perth (1902 to 1904). The old section of the hotel set back slightly from the street was constructed from 1853 by Samuel Craig. In its day it was considered the finest hotel outside Perth.
- Central Buildings comprise a range of single storey shops built up to the pavement over the period 1892 to 1907. The 1907 section was constructed by the Windsor family.
- The Ray White Real Estate building was constructed by the Ezywalkin Boot Company in 1908 and its first tenant was AJ WIlliams, a bootmaker.
- The next two shops were constructed in 1928 by Reginald Williams, a butcher.
- The building with Jules cafe was constructed in 1908 by Mrs Jeannie Thielemann for her bakery and grocery store. Her husband had gifted his property to her to avoid creditors in 1901 and then in 1911 decided to sue her to recover the property. He lost the court case.
- Settlers House was constructed from 1861 by blacksmith and builder Henry Stevens, it was used for accommodation by the Craig family who purchased the property in 1875, then as offices by Inkpen’s newspaper Eastern Districts Chronicle, restored in 1972 by Eric Turton.
- Pyke's buildings. These are the oldest shops abutting the footpath of central Avon Terrace, constructed by Joseph Pyke in 1885.
- The York Palace Hotel was constructed in 1909 by Matthew Ryan. The architect was Ernest Edwin Giles. It subsequently became a Swan Brewery hotel. The hotel was restored in 1997 by John Hay.
- The former Western Australian Bank was constructed in 1889. The building was designed by architect Talbot Hobbs in Victorian Academic Classical style. More recently, the building was used by Westpac Bank, which closed the branch in 2019.
- The York Fire Station is a single-storey red brick building originally constructed for the York Municipal Council as Council Chambers in 1897. The architect was Christian Mouritzen. The building is in Federation Free Classical style with Romanesque and Mannerist elements in its decoration. The building is now a bookshop.
- Motor Museum workshop. This building was built in about 1912 for William Thomas Davies and was used as a metal workshop, occupied by the army during World War II, then sold to Peter Briggs for use as a workshop for the York Motor Museum. Part used as a second hand shop.
- The Bank of Australasia building (north of Harvey Street) was constructed in 1900 in Federation Romanesque style. Later used by dentist and chemist, Bartlett Day, then used as Wansbrough’s and then Harvey’s funeral parlour, now a residence.
- Mongers Store, to the north of Christie's Retreat, was completed in 1879 for John Monger Jr by builder Thomas Davey; it was constructed of corrugated iron with a stone front and rear. In 1917, the building was purchased by the newly formed York Co-operative, and was later used for an oxyacetylene welding business.
- Faversham House on the other side of the railway line is a "grand residence" built in four stages by John Henry Monger Snr, and other members of the Monger family.
- The Sandalwood Yard was first used as such by John Henry Monger Snr in the 1840s. The stone building is likely to have been his original store, constructed between 1839 and 1843. It was then used for storage of chaff and grain for the horses that pulled John Monger's 80 wagons. It is now used by the York Society. Inside the yard is the reconstructed Tipperary school house.

== Avon Terrace east side walking south from Ford Street to the Town Hall ==
- The block on the corner was where the first buildings in York built by Rivett Henry Bland and Arthur Trimmer in 1831 were situated. In 1836, Trimmer arranged for their employee Ned Gallop to hide in the barn and shoot any aborigines who came to steal flour. Gallop shot an aboriginal woman and a child in the back as they walked away with flour.
- The empty block further south is the site of the "new" York Hotel, constructed by the Monger family in 1865, which operated as a hotel until the 1920s. There is a plaque with a picture of the building. Prior to that, it was the site of two earlier York Hotels, the first being constructed in 1837 by John Henry Monger Snr. At the south of this site is the last remnant of the York Hotel, being the billiard room, constructed in 1893.
- 156 Avon Terrace (after Christie's Retreat) is Town Lot 1, also the first lot granted in the town centre, being to John Henry Monger Snr in 1843. At the rear, on Christie Retreat, is the oldest building in the town centre, built in 1841 as a blacksmith's shop, then a coach house and stables constructed by Monger, becoming a pub called the Dusty Miller run by Solomon Cook, then Dunham’s Hotel run by William and Caroline Dunham., and then a boarding house run by George McLeod. The main building at the front was constructed in 1869 by George Monger, the youngest son of John Henry Monger, when he was 27. The house originally had a shingled roof. George Monger lived in the house until April 1878 when he leased the house to the Union Bank of Australasia, the first bank in York, which opened after constructing the nave like room at the front south side. In about 1904, the house was leased to George Ding who converted the house into a restaurant and boarding house with the name Penola House. This use ceased in 1942 and since then, the house has been in private occupation.

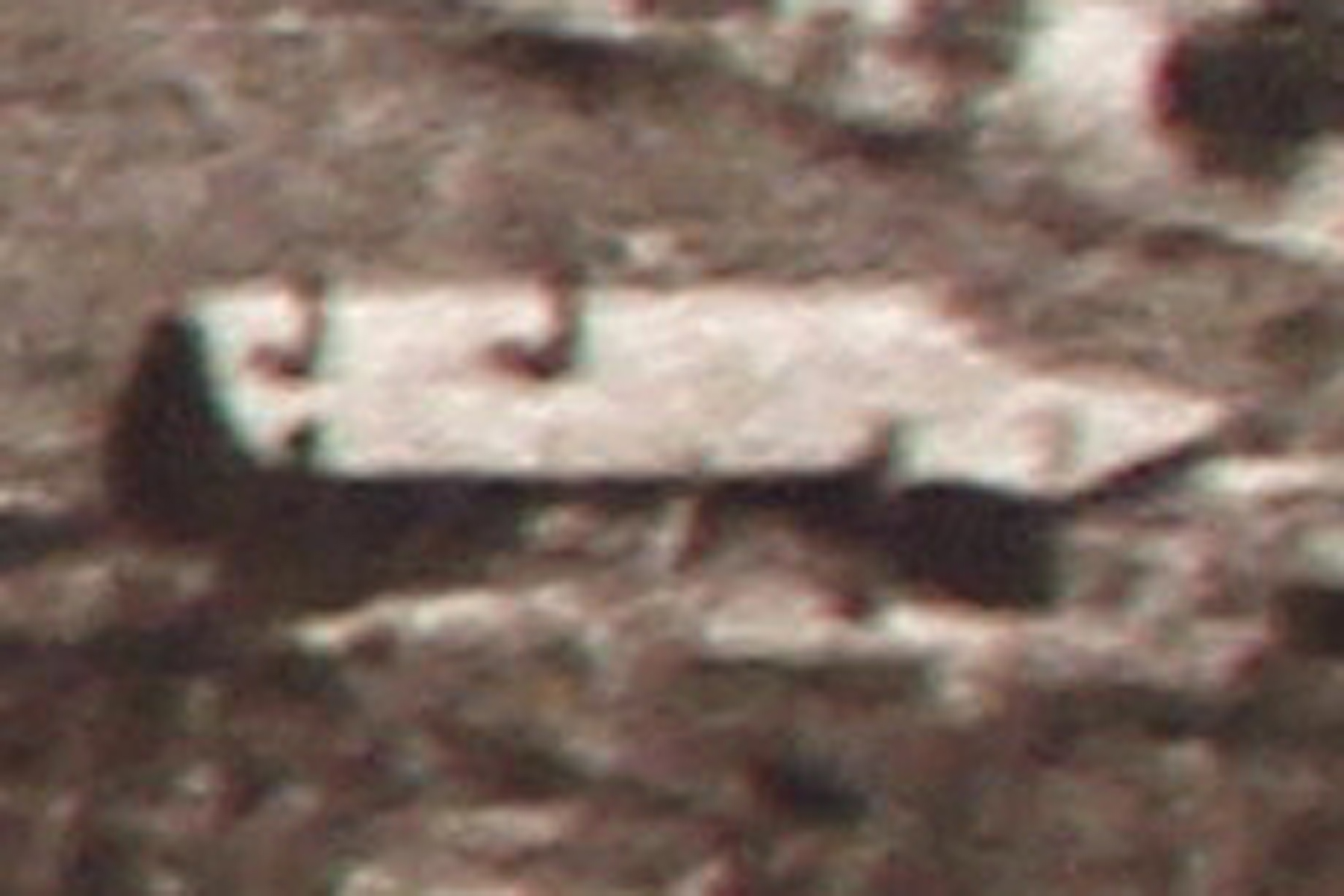
CWA building in 1877 from Mt Brown.

- The CWA building (No 154) was built in 1856 as a butcher’s shop by Robert Doncon, owner of the Kings Head Inn. The property was then purchased by Captain Richard Goldsmith Meares, the resident magistrate, whose son Richard Gamble Boyce Meares ran a store from the premises or next door. William Dinsdale Jr may have used the building as a boot and shoe shop prior to purchasing and constructing Dinsdale's Shoe Emporium next door. After then, the building was used by Thomas Horton for his taxi and carriage business. The property stayed in the Meares family until 1936 when it was sold to Frederick Bramby, a plumber, and his wife Stella. In 1953, it was bought by the Country Women’s Association of WA Inc for £750.
- Dinsdale's Shoe Emporium (1887) (No 152) was constructed by boot and saddle maker William Dinsdale, as an emporium and factory for leather products. Lettering from his original wall banner is still visible at the front of the shop. The architect of the building was James William Wright. Restored in 2019, its current use is as a gallery and gallery shop. The shop has the original 1887 Dinsdale shop counter.
- The Union Bank building (1900) was designed by JJ Talbot Hobbs and is in Federation Romanesque style and still has its public bank chambers inside. The building features an attached manager's residence set back from the street.
- Home Hardware is the former site of Solomon Cook’s flour mill (1850-c. 1900).
- Edwards Building (now the York and Districts Co-operative Ltd or IGA) is a large store constructed in 1882 by H Davey Jnr for Charles and Kenneth Edwards. The facade was "improved" with the erection of new front by Charles Edwards in 1893. Note the ornate stucco façade with its interesting motifs.
- The York Post Office (1895) is the oldest surviving two storey post and telegraph building in Western Australia. It was designed by George Temple-Poole as part of the civic complex. The building is in Federation Free Style, a form of Arts and Crafts style.
- The York Courthouse Complex was constructed between 1852 and 1896, with prison cells from the convict era, the No 2 courthouse designed by Richard Roach Jewell and the front sections being designed by George Temple-Poole as part of the civic complex. The building is in Federation Free Style, a form of Arts and Crafts style.
- The York Motor Museum building was constructed by the Windsor family in 1908. It now houses a motor museum.
- Bendigo Bank building is one of the few modern buildings in Avon Terrace and was originally built by the CBC Bank.
- Collins Building was built by W & H Collins in 1907 as shops with offices above.
- Davies Buildings were constructed by William Thomas Davies in 1908 as shops with additional accommodation for Castle Hotel guests above. The architect was Ernest Edwin Giles. The two-faced chiming clock was added by Laurie Davies in c. 1950 at a cost of £1,500, but had to be silenced from 8 pm to 8 am due to complaints from Castle Hotel guests. The verandah posts were removed in 1968 by council order.
- The empty block (after South Street) is the former site of the Royal Hotel, which was demolished after the 1968 Meckering earthquake.
- The Shell garage was built in 1926 by Lou Theilemann and is the second oldest continuous in use Shell garage in Australia.
- Seabrook Row is a group of four shops.
- The Rabbit Shed was built in about 1920 and had cold storage for rabbit skins during the rabbit plague.
- When constructed, the York Town Hall (1911) was one of the largest public halls in Western Australia. It was built during the period of Edwardian opulence. The building is in Federation Mannerist style with exaggerated classical features. The architect was James William Wright.
