= York Fire Station =

Historic site in York, Western Australia

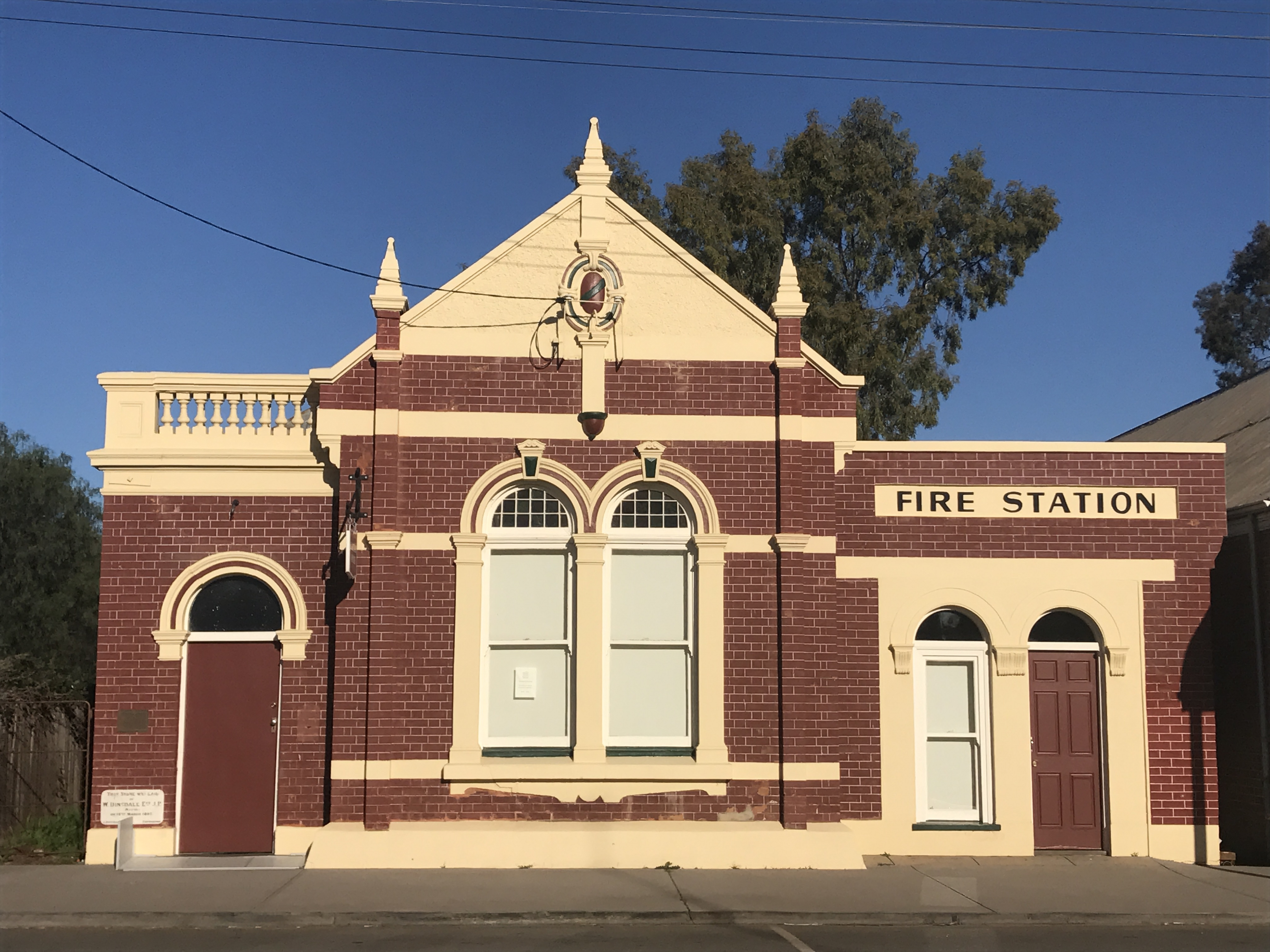
- York Fire Station in 2018
- Interactive map of the York Fire Station area

General information
- Location: 31.8876°S 116.7682°E, 151 Avon Terrace, York, Western Australia
- Construction started: 1897

Design and construction
- Architecture firm: Christian Mouritzen

Western Australia Heritage Register
- Type: State Registered Place
- Designated: 11 December 1998
- Reference no.: 2860

References
- York municipal inventory

The York Fire Station is a single-storey red brick building originally constructed for the York Municipal Council as Council Chambers in 1897, in York, Western Australia.

The architect was Christian Mouritzen. The building is in Federation Free Style Federation Free Style (a commercial version of Arts and Crafts Style) with rendered areas and stucco contrasted against red brickwork.

After the completion of the York Town Hall in 1911, the building was sold and later converted for use as a fire station. The building is now a bookshop.

== York Municipality ==
The York Municipality was gazetted on 4 March 1871 and the first election was held on 15 March 1871. Council meetings were held in the Odd Fellows Hall and the Mechanic’s Institute for a period of 26 years.

In the early 1890s, the Council offices were diagonally opposite, in the building behind Dinsdale's Shoe Emporium. William Dinsdale became mayor in 1896. Dinsdale decided that a municipal chamber should be erected because a town hall was not needed at that time.

== Purchase of site ==
The land was formerly part of the manse field of the Wesleyan glebe lands granted by the Government in 1852 to John Smithies in connection with his coming to York to establish the Gerald Mission to train aboriginal children for farm work.

In 1886, Rev Bird offered the land to the Council, but it was not until 1893 that the land, Suburban Lot D Block 3, was purchased for £200, and a building erected using a government grant of £520.

== Construction ==
The architect for the building was Danish born Christian Mouritzen. He arrived in Perth in 1892 and gained employment as a draughtsman. He worked on the Beaconsfield school and the Bunbury hospital and post office, and the old York hospital. In 1895 he was the government building supervisor living in York and overseeing construction of the court house. He designed and lived in Laurelville.

Mr. J Butterley won the tender for the erection of the new council chambers in Avon Terrace for £425.2.0.

The foundation stone was laid by Dinsdale on 18 March 1897. The trowel for the laying of the foundation stone was given by the Dinsdale family to the Shire of York in August 2018.

The building was completed by July and opened by the governor, Gerard Smith on 8 September 1897. After being shown the three-roomed council chambers, the governor voiced concern that the "importance of York should quickly outgrow the accommodation of the building. In time it was sure to become too small…".

== Use as council chambers ==
The minutes of the first council meeting held in the new chambers in August 1897 state: "Before the business of the meeting was proceeded with, the Mayor Mr Dinsdale welcomed the Councillors to the new Chambers and expressed a hope that the town would advance sufficiently to warrant the erection of a Town Hall at a future date. The new building however would suit their requirements for the present".

The council moved out of this building when the new York Town Hall and Chambers were completed in 1911.

== Fire station ==
The property was advertised for sale in 1912 and acquired by William Thomas Davies, a member of the Municipal Council. At this time the property contained the main brick building of three rooms and back verandah with stables, harness room and toilet to the rear.

The York Volunteer Fire Brigade that had been formed in 1910, moved into the building in October 1912. The Prunster family was instrumental in the relocation to the new premises, and also led a very successful football team. Joseph Herman Prunster was an original member who later served as captain of the Fire Brigade for seven years. Initially the Fire Station was rented from Davies at a cost of 25 pence per week, before the building was purchased in 1914 by the WA Fire Brigades Board for £700.

The Fire Brigade firstly erected a garage for their vehicle, which was built onto the former mayor’s office. They recessed into a horizontal rendered band the words "Fire Station" on the front of this extension, which can be seen clearly from Avon Terrace.

The front room was converted to a bedroom, allowing the station to be staffed at night.

In 1921, a reel house was added to the north side of the building at a cost of £150 to house the water hose cart. In 1928, the first motorised fire engine arrived, a T-model Ford referred to as "Motor 36". This in turn was replaced in 1941 by a new motor pump number 17, also a T-model Ford. This required enlargement of the engine room and the back wall was removed and extended back several feet, probably by volunteer labour. Subsequent fire engines were a Dodge in the late 1940s, an Austin in 1957 and a Bedford truck in 1972.

A kitchen was added to the building by 1951 that included a Metters No 2 stove. The jarrah bell tower was replaced in 1952 and the fire bell replaced by a siren in 1955.

This building served as the York Fire Station for 77 years.

== More recent uses ==
In 1989, because a new fire station had opened in York, the Fire Brigades Board decided to sell the property.

The Shire of York agreed to purchase this building and entered into discussions with community groups regarding its future use. The building was transferred to the Municipality of the Shire of York in November 1989 for $8,588.73. A management committee was formed from community members.

In 1991 the Community Centre received a Lotteries Commission grant of $25,000 for restoration work including alterations to the engine room facade, replacement of ceilings and removal of skirtings. Additional Lotteries Commission grants in 1993 and 1995 aided in further renovations.

Community groups using the centre over the years included the Toy Library, York Friendship Group, childcare groups and playgroups, pottery, theatre, yoga, senior citizens and rural youth groups. It was the meeting place for morning tea for the Friday shopping bus, and the office of the local newspaper.

The building was sold by the Shire of York in January 2014 and purchased by the current owners in March 2015 as the home for Barclay Books.

== Heritage listings ==
The National Trust of Australia (WA) classified the Old Fire Station on 5 March 1985 for architectural technical accomplishment, historical significance and environmental importance.

The building was placed on the York Municipal Inventory in December 1995.

The building was made a permanent entry in the State Register of Heritage Places on 11 December 1998.

The building is also listed in the Fire & Rescue Service Heritage Inventory on 30 August 1997.
