= Imperial Hotel, York =

Hotel in York, Western Australia

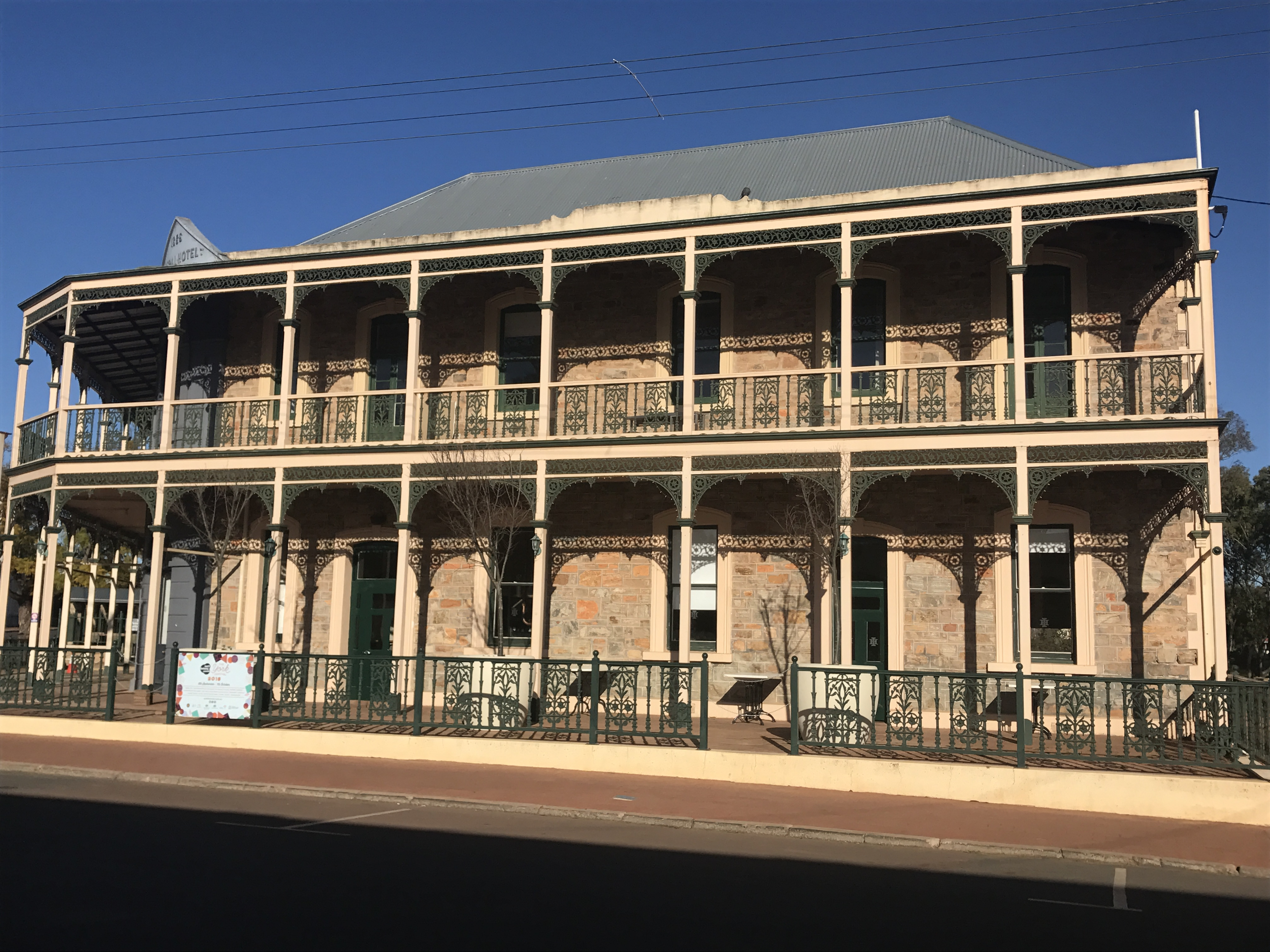
- Imperial Hotel, York, in 2018
- Interactive map of the Imperial Hotel, York area

General information
- Architectural style: Victorian Filigree
- Location: 31.8911°S 116.7682°E, Corner of Avon Terrace and Joaquina Street, York, Western Australia
- Construction started: 1886
- Renovated: 1987, 2018

Western Australia Heritage Register
- Type: State Registered Place
- Designated: 13 July 2007
- Reference no.: 10725

The Imperial Hotel was the first hotel to be built in York, Western Australia that adopted the new "Australian hotel" style in hotel design, with a dominant position on a main street corner block, high and ornate double verandahs surrounding the façade and a main entrance onto the street. The building is in Victorian Filigree style.

== Coming of rail to York ==
A poor road from York to Guildford had always been a major problem for the transport of produce. In 1881, following the opening of the Eastern Railway from Fremantle to Guildford, the line was extended to Chidlow.

Engineer/architect James William Wright and engineer Edward Keane successfully tendered for the Eastern Railway line extension to York, and the line was extended in 1885.

== Subdivision and construction ==
In York, in 1885, part of Avon Locations X and Y on the south side of South Street and owned by merchant John Henry Monger Jnr was subdivided. Location Y was traversed by the Eastern Railway line, then under construction, and the York station yard was located within the new subdivision. Already on the land was the Sisters of Mercy convent and school, on South Street, and the York Mechanic’s Institute on Avon Terrace (where the Town Hall is now situated).

James Grave and Edward Keane acquired Lots 12 and 13 on the corner of Avon Terrace and Joaquina Street, which led directly to the railway station. Grave was an investor in the railway line extension to York.

On 18 December 1885, Grave, Keane, William Mumme and Frederick Monger obtained a £4,000 mortgage from the Bank of New South Wales, presumably to pay for part of the cost of construction of the hotel. Frederick Monger was the son of John Henry Monger Jnr, and Mumme was a major partner in the Swan Brewery and owned a small brewery in York. The hotel was under construction in November 1885. No tenders for the construction have been located. The contractors were A. J. Castledine and A. B. Wright, and the work was supervised by Castledine.

== Opening ==
On 29 May 1886, Frederick Thomas Pamment advertised his intention of applying for a Publican’s General Licence for the hotel. The place was described at that time as containing thirteen bedrooms and four sitting rooms, exclusive of those required by the family. The licence application notice revealed that Pamment was leasing the hotel from Keane, Monger, Grave and Mumme.

A report on the hotel appeared in the Western Mail in July:

The “Imperial Hotel”, is finished and will be opened on Thursday next..... One noticeable feature in the building is that the bar trade is entirely distinct from the hotel, while a suite of detached rooms, now nearly complete, are intended for second class lodgers. Along the entire front of the hotel is a handsome balcony over one hundred feet in length, from which a nice view is obtained. The landlord Mr. F. T. Pamment, late of the Clarendon Hotel Perth, aided by workmen from the W.A. Manufacturing Company, has had a stiff week of it in making preparations for the opening.....Adjoining the Hotel there is to be a large music hall 70 x 50 feet in the clear and material is now being carted for its erection. The whole of the works have been constructed under the immediate superintendence of Mr Castledine who deserves every credit for the care he has taken.

The hotel was opened on 8 July 1886, but the event received only a brief sentence in the local newspaper with the comment that the place "seems to be favoured with a fair share of public patronage". An advertisement that appeared in the Western Mail in October 1886, describes the hotel as having private dining rooms, special suites of rooms, sample rooms for commercial travellers, plunge and shower baths, a splendid billiard room fitted with one of Alcock’s best tables, and good stabling and loose boxes with an attentive ostler in attendance. The second class accommodation mentioned in the earlier description was also referred to.

== Fire ==
On 10 February 1894, around midnight, a fire broke out in a group of shops in a galvanised iron building immediately adjoining the Imperial Hotel to the north. These shops had been there since at least 1889. The shops were Hillman & Co’s furniture and upholstery warehouse where the fire started, and north, Mr Lewis’s tailoring and fabrics establishment. A crowd of several hundred gathered and were unable to do anything about the shops but were able to prevent the fire from burning down the Imperial Hotel. The flames broke through a window into one of the bedrooms but “they were successfully combated”. “The billiard room below would appear to have suffered to a greater extent the walls being damaged together with a number of billiard cues, balls etc. Fortunately the wind was blowing the flames away from the hotel otherwise the main building would have suffered to an alarming extent. Furniture was removed out into the street, the spirit room emptied, while horses and vehicles were taken from the stables and placed in safety away from the premises.”

== Charles Playter ==
Charles Playter normally lived in North Fremantle but was a lodger at the Imperial Hotel in February 1898. He was at the time working as a draughtsman with the Railways Department. At his home in North Fremantle, on a hot night, Playter was used to stepping out through his window onto the verandah so he could breathe the cool air. This night at the Imperial Hotel, it was very hot, so Playter stepped out through the window to discover that there was no verandah and no balcony. He fell 18 feet (5.5 m) to the ground and suffered serious injuries. Next morning, Playter was found on the ground outside the hotel in some pain. He died a few hours later.

== Subsequent history ==
Following its construction, the hotel would have benefited from its proximity to the York railway station, as the major Western Australian port at the time was Albany and all traffic passed through York. The hotel would also have been well patronised during the early gold rush years, when people rushing to the goldfields left the train at York and then travelled the rest of the way on foot. This passing trade would have reduced considerably in the mid 1890s when the railway line was continued through to Southern Cross.

In 1892, the Swan Brewery took over Mumme's interest in the hotel and in 1901 acquired the whole title. From 1 January 1898, the hotel was leased to Laurence Philip Bowes, and after Bowes' death, the lease was transferred to his wife Mary and then to Charles Tyler Pyke in August 1902. A year later, Pyke acquired title.

A single-storey building adjoining the Imperial Hotel, York on the Avon Terrace frontage is shown in a c. 1900 photograph of the town. This is almost certainly the music hall, and offers an explanation as to why the hotel building did not utilise the full street frontage. The music hall was removed in the 1910.

Since the early 20th century, ownership of the hotel has changed many times.

In 1920, a single story stone kitchen was added and a larger public bar was installed in the area where the kitchen and dining room had been, with the dining room being relocated to the area of the original small bars, under which was a cellar. From 1933, the second class lodgers accommodation was used as staff quarters.

The 1968 Meckering earthquake damaged the hotel and many other buildings in the district. The two-storey, bull nose verandah had to be removed and the condition of the building declined. By 1981, the hotel had been speculatively purchased and the licence on-sold. The Imperial was then closed as ‘unfit for human habitation’ and became subject to vandalism and weather deterioration.

In 1982 it was purchased by Roger Seares saving it from demolition.

With personal finance the building was rehabilitated extensively and brought back to a habitable condition as a private hotel. It hosted private individuals, conference groups and festival patrons. During that time the outhouses that had originally been the stables for the hotel were gutted and renovated to create further accommodation.

The hotel was sold in 1987 to a syndicate of York investors.

The hotel was acquired by York Motels Pty Ltd (1987-1993) including local builder David Ayoub. He rebuilt the verandahs, using wrought iron work manufactured in Sydney to match the originals, but the fretwork arches on the lower level and the bullnose verandah roof were not reproduced.

In the early 2000s, a fire in the stables destroyed the timberwork of the building, including the roof timbers. Material that was not destroyed, including the hewn timber horse troughs, was removed leaving only the stone walls standing.

The hotel was renovated in about 2010 and again by a local farming syndicate in 2018 and has reopened, providing meals and refreshments.
