= Smithies =

Smithies may refer to:

- Smithies (surname)
- Smithies boiler, a type of steam boiler
- Smithies Peak, a mountain in Tasmania, Australia
- Smithies, South Yorkshire, an area of Barnsley, Yorkshire, England
- Smithies, students or alumni of Smith College in Northampton, Massachusetts, USA

== See also ==
- Smithy (disambiguation)
