= Samuel Craig =

Samuel Craig may refer to:

- Samuel Alfred Craig (1839–1920), Civil War soldier and member of the U.S. House of Representatives from Pennsylvania
- Samuel G. Craig (1874–1960), American minister and college football player and coach
- Samuel Smale Craig (1802–1864), settler of York, Western Australia and hotel owner
