= Smithies (surname) =

Smithies is a surname. It may refer to:

- Alex Smithies (born 1990), English football player
- Bob Smithies (1934–2006), British journalist and crossword compiler
- Catherine Smithies (1785–1877), English philanthropist and campaigner
- Frank Smithies (1912–2012), British mathematician
- John Smithies (1802–1872), Wesleyan missionary
- John J. Smithies (born 1954), founding director of the Australian Centre for the Moving Image
- Karen Smithies (born 1969), English international cricketer
- Oliver Smithies (1925–2017), British biologist
- Thomas Bywater Smithies (1817–1883), English radical publisher and campaigner
