= Smithy =

Smithy may refer to:

- Forge or smithy, the workplace of a smith or a blacksmith

== Films ==
- Smithy (1924 film), a silent American film starring Stan Laurel
- Smithy (1933 film), a British comedy-drama film starring Edmund Gwenn
- Smithy (1946 film), an Australian film based on Sir Charles Kingsford Smith's flight across the Pacific Ocean

== People and fictional characters ==
- Smithy (nickname), a list of people and fictional characters
- Horace Smithy (1914–1948), American cardiac surgeon
