= Samuel Smale Craig =

Samuel Smale Craig (1802–1864) and his wife Mary were settlers to York, Western Australia who arrived in 1850 and then built the Castle Hotel, which was then run by the Craig family for 137 years.

== Early life ==
Craig was born on the farm at Nether-Garrel, Kirkmichael, Scotland, prior to 10 October 1802, He was the second son of John Craig and his second wife Henrietta Bell.

In 1842, at age 40, he married Mary Anne Morton.

According to family legend, Craig invented a means for igniting and extinguishing street lights from the ground, thus obviating the need for ladders, however there is no evidence of any patent having been lodged.

== Emigration ==
By whatever means, he amassed enough money to bring his family to the Swan River Colony, arriving on the ship Sophia on 27 July 1850. (Note: This was the first bride ship, carrying 43 single women.) After arrival, his middle name was changed from the name of his village priest, Smail, to Smale.

The Colony's first introduction to the Craig family was a letter from the Craigs to the Independent Journal dated 27 August 1850 complaining about the conduct of Mr Parr, Surgeon Superintendent on Sophia. The Craigs must have come with some money and status as they donated 2 guineas for the erection of an independent chapel in Fremantle.

== York Hotel ==
On 25 November 1851, Craig purchased the licence for and leased the York Hotel from John Henry Monger Snr. A claim was made against Craig by a man called Byrnes for return of a horse sold to Craig for £30 (“when Byrnes was sober”) to pay for liquor bills on 13 January 1852. Following this, Craig was shortly after reported as racing a horse called Tom O’Shanter.

On 8 May 1852, Craig was granted a liquor licence for the Agricultural and Commercial Hotel. (Note: This is presumed to be the York Hotel.) Craig announced improvements to the Agricultural and Commercial Hotel in August and September 1852. Then in August 1853, Monger advertised that the York Hotel was available for lease, indicating that Craig had moved on.

== Castle Hotel ==
Craig constructed the Castle Hotel on land he purchased from Monger. However, Craig had difficulty transferring the liquor licence to his new hotel.

Magistrates (Meares and Cowan) developed a high level of prejudice towards him as a result of what were considered flagrant misdemeanours in the past. Craig tried to circumvent them by appealing directly to the government but was unsuccessful, and when his application eventually came before the magistrates he received a most adverse report which concluded with the remark: "He is the most lawless man in the district and not fit man to have a licence".

On 26 August 1854, Craig was summoned to the York Police Court on information supplied by Joseph Kenworthy for charging “a person named Redmile” for “two bottles of grog” sold from his new premises when he did not have a license for the new premises. Redmile refused to give evidence and the magistrates threatened to fine Redmile £20 because he would not support the information supplied by Kenworthy. Craig said he was giving the “grog” away to friends. He was fined £10.

An acrimonious debate ensued in relation to the licence but Craig eventually received his licence.

In October 1854, Craig sold alcohol on a Sunday and an incident that some described as a riot occurred at the Castle Hotel, resulting in extensive damage to the building. His hotel was accused of being “a playground for drunks”. He was fined by the magistrates but refused to pay. He would have lost his licence except for the timely intervention of Mary. She pleaded that her husband had built a large house, had a large family and if he lost his licence he would be ruined. This emotional outbreak, coupled with strong community support for the Craigs, tipped the scales in their favour and his licence was not lost.

Craig provided bricks for the construction of the York courthouse in 1859.

In October 1862, Craig advertised that he had completed a large addition to his hotel but within two months he also announced that he was about to retire because of hill-health and would lease his premises. In January the next year, Craig announced he would put the hotel up for sale.

In September 1863, Craig was fined £5 for breach of the Publican's Ordinance. In November he advertised that the Perth authorities had refused to renew his licence, claiming that the "best appointed inn in the Colony" was about to be closed down. Craig tried to arouse the local community against the magistrates, who were supported by the local correspondent who pointed out that objections to Craig were his breaches of the Act not to his fine house. However Craig retained his licence.

In 1864, Craig lost his liquor licence, a cause of some public debate given that the hotel was considered the “best appointed house in the Colony”. The problem was overcome by Joseph Monger temporarily holding a licence for the Craigs. (Note: Joseph Monger, one of the sons of John Henry Monger Snr, had married Craig's daughter Mary Jane Craig on 4 March 1862.)

In September 1866, a conditional pardon man was stabbed by a ticket-of-leave holder. This was reported in the Perth Gazette as having taken place at “Craig’s public house”. An indignant Craig wrote a letter to the paper saying that “such an atrocity has never been committed on my premises since I have kept the Castle Hotel, extending over 14 years”. The newspaper published a note to the effect that the “case of stabbing occurred at Albert’s York Hotel on the day in question”.

Craig and his wife Mary continued to run the Castle Hotel until his death. His hotel was very successful. (Note: William Marwick described Craig as his banker.)

Craig died at the Castle Hotel on 12 December 1869.
