= York Courthouse Complex =

Building in York, Western Australia

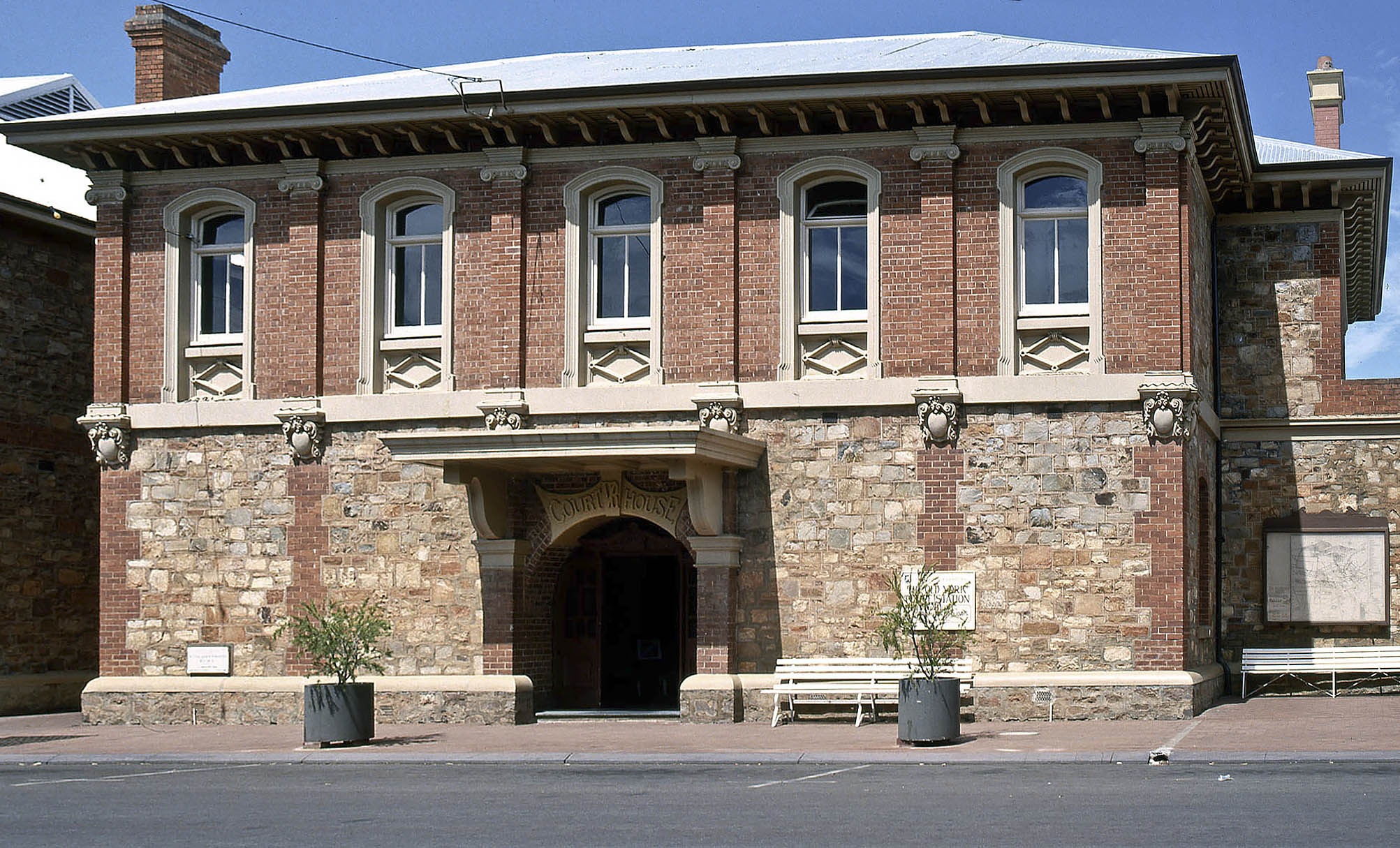
- York Courthouse Complex in 2008
- Interactive map of the York Courthouse Complex area
- Alternative names: York Police Station

General information
- Location: 124 Avon Tce, York, Western Australia
- Coordinates: 31.8887°S 116.7687°E
- Construction started: 1852
- Completed: 1896

Design and construction
- Architect: George Temple-Poole

Western Australia Heritage Register
- Official name: York Police Station, Court House & Gaol
- Type: State Registered Place
- Designated: 16 December 1994
- Reference no.: 2852

The York Courthouse Complex, on Avon Terrace in York, Western Australia, was built from 1852 to 1896, and is one of the most significant built sites from a heritage and architectural perspective in the state.

== Cell block and police quarters ==
Ticket of leave men (as convicts on assigned work duties were called) were frequently reported by their employers for various offences, particularly drunkenness, a common punishment for which was 7 to 14 days in the lock-up. So in 1852, a cell block and police quarters were constructed. These buildings appear on the left hand side of Captain Edmund Henderson’s drawing of York published in The Illustrated London News of 28 February 1857. The lockup is basically as it exists today except for the entrance to the later large exercise yard, and the removal of some interior walls to make larger cells. The cell block was constructed by the 20th Company of Royal Sappers and Miners.

== Courthouse ==
In 1859, what is now called the No. 2 courthouse was added to the complex on the south side of the police station. This courthouse was doubled in size in 1874, the architect being Richard Roach Jewell.

== Troopers’ cottage and stables ==
In 1865, a troopers’ cottage and stables were added on the river side of the cells, and an exercise yard for the cells.

== New courthouse and police quarters ==
In 1895, the old police quarters were demolished a new courthouse and police quarters were constructed in front of the complex along Avon Terrace, at a cost of £3,000. John Forrest laid the foundation stone on 24 October 1895, being presented with a "handsome silver trowel suitably inscribed" for the purpose. Forrest noted that the foundation stone "would serve to bring to the minds of future generations a date in the history of Western Australia when the colony had been passing through a period of great commercial and industrial activity as a result of the discovery and rapid expansion of the goldfields".

On completion in 1896, these new buildings were regarded unfavourably by the town mainly because of their overly prominent and dominating position in the main street. York residents also objected to the jail remaining in the centre of the main street.

The police quarters ceased to be used in 1981, and the courthouse in 1983 when the complex was acquired by the National Trust of Australia (WA).

== Architectural significance ==
The architect of the front buildings was George Temple-Poole and the building is in Federation Free Style, a commercial version of Federation Arts and Crafts style.

The York Post Office, constructed in 1893, and the Courthouse and police station "form one of the finest building groups in the State with great vitality within harmonious unity", according to heritage architect, Ian Molyneux.

== Current use ==
The Courthouse complex is currently used as a commercial art gallery.

== Classification ==
The complex is classified by the National Trust of Australia (5 March 1985), which owns the complex, is recorded on the Aboriginal Sites Register, is permanently on the Register of the National Estate (21 March 1978), on the Shire register (31 December 1995), and permanently on the State Register of Heritage Places (16 December 1994).
