= Castle Hotel, York =

Heritage listed building in York, Western Australia

Castle Hotel
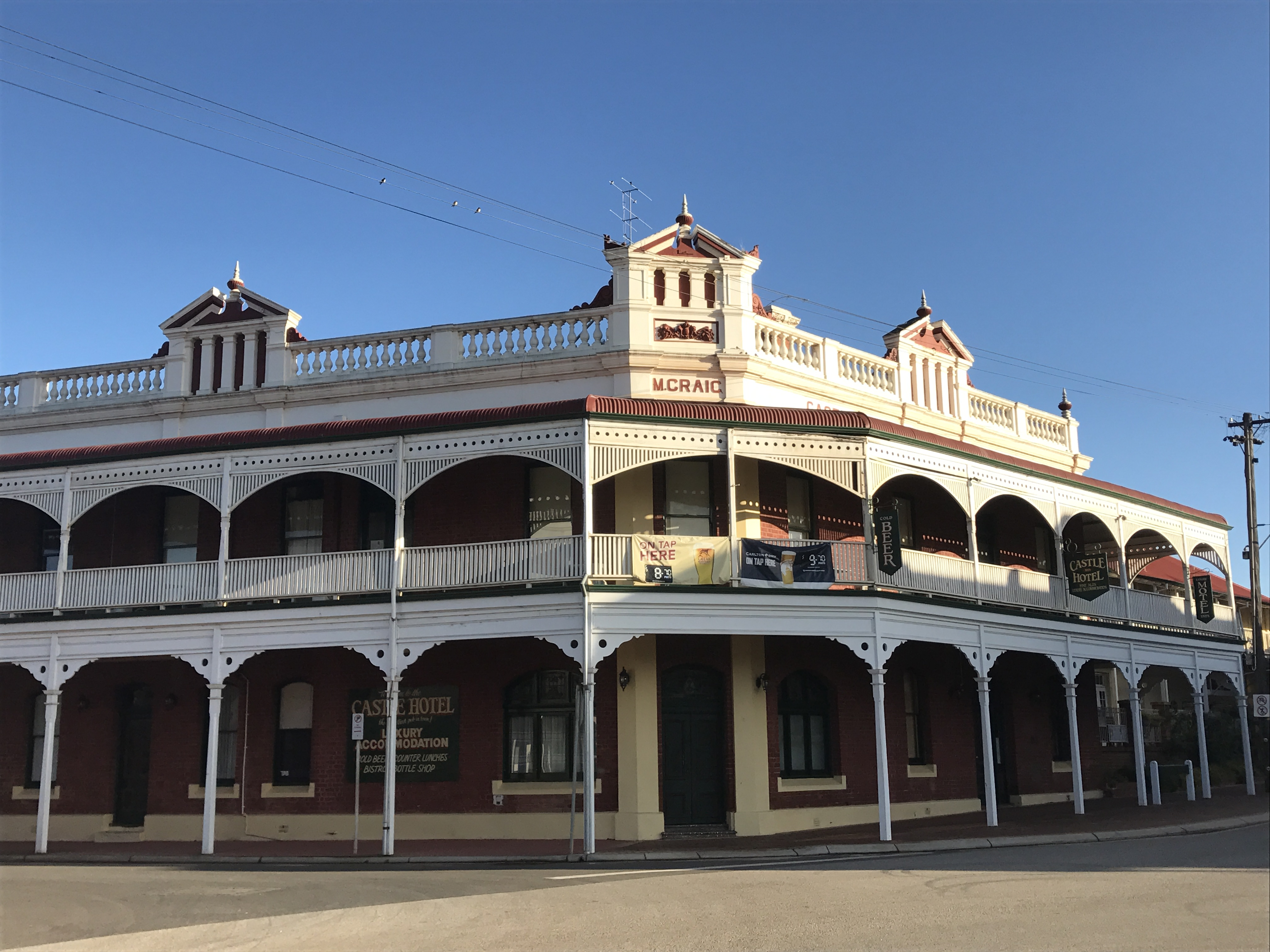
- Castle Hotel, York in 2018

General information
- Architectural style: Federation Filigree
- Location: 31.8899°S 116.7682°E, Corner of Avon Terrace and South Street, York, Western Australia
- Construction started: 1853
- Completed: 1912

Design and construction
- Architect: William George Wolf

References
- York municipal inventory

The Castle Hotel in York is one of the oldest surviving hotels in Western Australia. Its first proprietor was Samuel Craig and it was then held by members of the Craig family for 137 years.

The hotel was constructed in three stages, the old section on Avon Terrace in 1853, extended in 1862, and the corner Federation Filigree addition, built by May Craig in 1905/1912. (Note: The maiden name of James Craig's wife was Emilia May Trigg, but she had always been called May.)

== History ==
The Crown Grant for the land on which the Castle Hotel stands was originally granted to John Henry Monger Snr on 3 November 1852 for £11. He also took a grant of the property to the rear for £11.

The original part of the current building which is called the Castle Hotel (right hand side on Avon Terrace) was constructed in 1853 for Samuel Craig using ticket-of-leave men from the York Convict Hiring Depot. (Note: Monger was an engineer and one of the only people in York with building skills for a two storey building (he had just finished building the two storey second stage of Faversham House), and as the property was not assigned by Monger to Craig until after it was constructed, it is likely that Monger was involved in the design and construction of this first stage of the hotel.)

By September 1853, Craig was trading as the Castle Hotel and the York Agricultural Society held a meeting there.

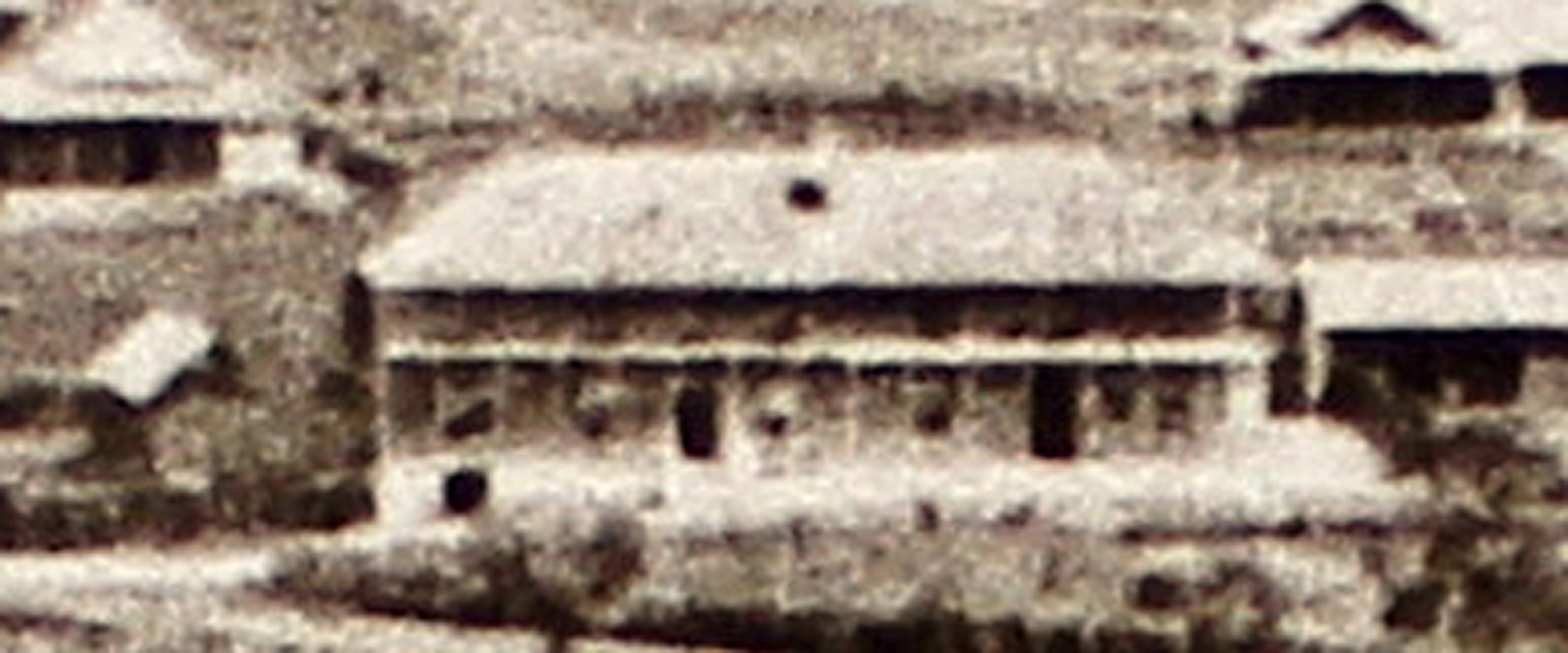
Castle Hotel in about October 1877, from a panorama photograph taken by James Manning for the Paris Exhibition 1878. The rise in Avon Terrace was removed in 1907.

Title was transferred from John Henry Monger to Samuel Craig in December 1853 for £20. (Note: The price is obviously for the land only.) Monger remained the owner of the property to the rear though it is now part of the hotel site.

Samuel Craig announced the opening of the old section of the Castle Hotel on 1 November 1854, promising “the largest and choicest selection of wines, spirits, etc ever brought over the hill”. From that time on, all the meetings of the York Agricultural Society were held at the Castle Hotel and it became their unofficial headquarters.

An advertisement dated 20 December 1855 and published on 23 January 1856 describes the establishment as offering “excellent beds, good stabling, and an ostler always in attendance. Private upstairs sitting rooms and bedrooms were available, along with a selection of superior wines, spirits, cordials, ale, and porter, kept in a spacious, cool cellar. The premises also included commodious stockyards and enclosures.”

Praise was given to Samuel Craig in a newspaper of the day in September 1856:“Mr Craig has deserved well for the way in which his rooms, and especially the bedrooms, are arranged for light, air, and cleanliness; and although the other hotel-keepers are not chargeable with any want of the latter, they do not keep pace with the times; there is a visible want of progress about them in comparison with the Castle Hotel.

The hotel survived the flood of July 1862 when the water was 1 m (3 ft) deep in the cellar. The hotel was extended with a "large addition" to the south of the original in 1862, virtually doubling the premises.

This extended and older part of the hotel was described in 1966 as "an almost perfectly preserved coaching inn complex complete with kitchen, meat house, laundry, bathrooms, forge, stables, and fodder house clustered round a broad, generous courtyard at the back".

Samuel's wife, Mary Craig became the licensee in November 1869 and a month later, Samuel Craig died. (Note: He died in the Castle Hotel on 12 December 1869.) The business continued under the reins of Mary, who was referred to as the “hostess” of the Castle Hotel. (Note: From 1872, she was being assisted by eldest son Frank.)

== Royal coat of arms ==
The royal coat of arms was painted on the wall of the dining room of the Castle Hotel around this time. This insignia was revealed during 1989 renovations to the hotel when one of the walls was stripped of its old paint. The coat of arms was probably painted on the wall for a visit or stay of a Governor. A most likely occasion for this was when Governor Sir Frederick Weld visited York and stayed at the Castle Hotel on 21 October 1869, because the whole town made an enormous fuss of the Governor on this visit. (Note: For 600 yards (metres) from the north of the main street to the Castle Hotel, Avon Terrace was festooned with streamers. A number of buildings displayed flags, and a triumphal arch was erected at the entrance to the town. On that side of the arch facing the street was a crown and V.R. and a black swan, and the words “God Speed You”. On the opposite side were the words “Welcome over the Hills” and the Red Ensign supported with streamers. There were other visits by Governors but none so momentous.)

== Frank, William, James and May Craig ==
From July 1883, (Note: This is when Frank Craig returned to York after running Mary's hotel in Cossack.) Mary's son Frank was managing the hotel. In December 1884, Mary Craig leased the hotel to Frank. Frank constructed a separate building on the corner "for the purpose of banquetting". (Note: This building can be seen on the left in the 1904 photograph in this article.)

On 12 November 1885, a fire broke out in the yard of the Castle Hotel, burning a haystack, a dray, some timber and about 10 tons of sandalwood, all worth over £250. On 29 January 1888, a Mr D’Elmaine was staying at the Castle Hotel and went out onto the balcony for some fresh air. A draft came in the door and blew flames from a candle onto the things on his bed which caught alight. The fire was put out but the whole of his bedding was burnt.

Frank Craig added a billiard room to the hotel in 1887.

In 1892, for a short period Cobb & Co ran a coach from York to the Yilgarn, with bookings at the Castle Hotel.

On 11 November 1892, quoting the Eastern Districts Chronicle:

a man named Peter Donnolley, employed as ostler at the Castle Hotel, had made application to Mr. Frank Craig, the landlord, for drink to be supplied to him. This he was refused as he had been previously supplied with two or three glasses of liquor. Not satisfied with this Donnolley made repeated requests to be served, and refusing to leave the bar to attend to his duties Mr. Craig endeavoured to quietly eject him. This evidently enraged Donnolley who with an open pen-knife attacked Mr. Craig, and succeeded in stabbing him in the stomach the full length of the blade, following up with an oath congratulating himself upon having achieved his end. Moving away Mr. Craig experienced a peculiar feeling, which turned out to be blood emanating from the wound. The police were at once summoned, and Donnolley was arrested, a knife being found in his possession.

A few weeks later, Frank Craig handed the business over to his brother William T Craig, who renovated the premises. William handed over to his brother James and May Craig in 1896. (Note: James purchased the hotel at auction for £3,000 on 1 October 1901.)

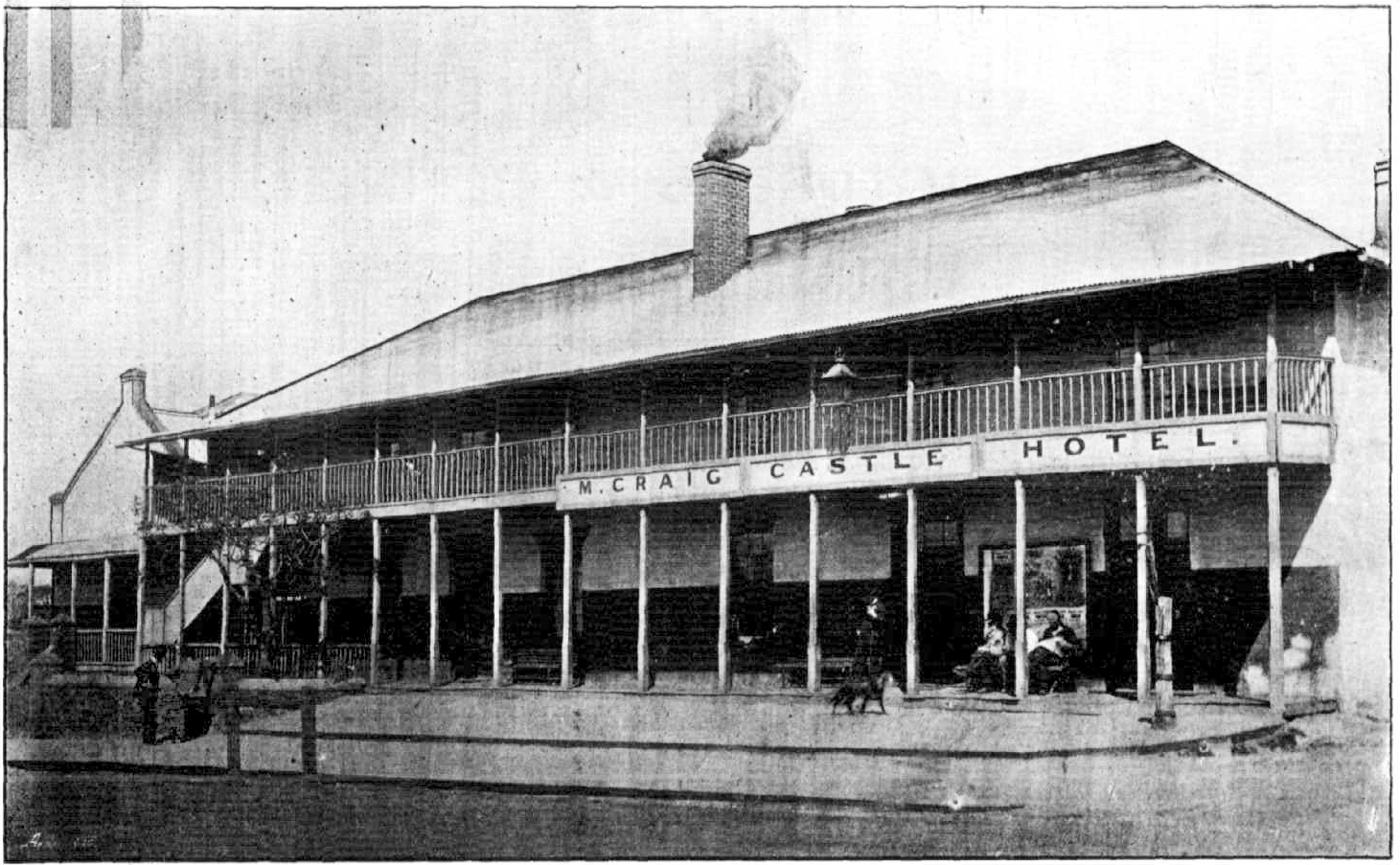
Castle Hotel in 1904 with a sign "M Craig" ("M" being for May).

May continued to run the hotel after James' accidental drowning while at sea in 1902.

May constructed the corner building in 1905 and 1912. The architect was William G Wolf, a several times bankrupt American architect who had been designing buildings in Melbourne and Sydney and had just completed the design and construction of His Majesty's Theatre (1902 to 1904).

The key authors on Australian architectural style describe the Castle Hotel as “a corner pub screened with loggia-like verandah” and they included the hotel as an exemplar of Federation Filigree style.

May leased the hotel to Thomas Charles Evans (Note: Evans had managed the grocery and hardware departments of Edwards' store.) in March 1905, taking control again in 1915. May died on 7 January 1924 and left the hotel to her son Basil, who continued to run the hotel.

The bar of the Castle Hotel was the scene of a murder on 17 April 1953 when market gardeners from two feuding Albanian families attacked each other and one was fatally stabbed.

The Craig family continued to own and run the hotel until 1990, extensively restoring and enlarging the hotel. Only the stables were damaged in the 1968 Meckering earthquake.

== Heritage registration ==
- York Municipal Inventory, 31 December 1995
- Classified by the National Trust, 5 March 1985
- Register of the National Estate Permanent, 21 March 1978
