= York Motor Museum =

Museum in Western Australia

Coordinates: 31°53′21″S 116°46′07″E

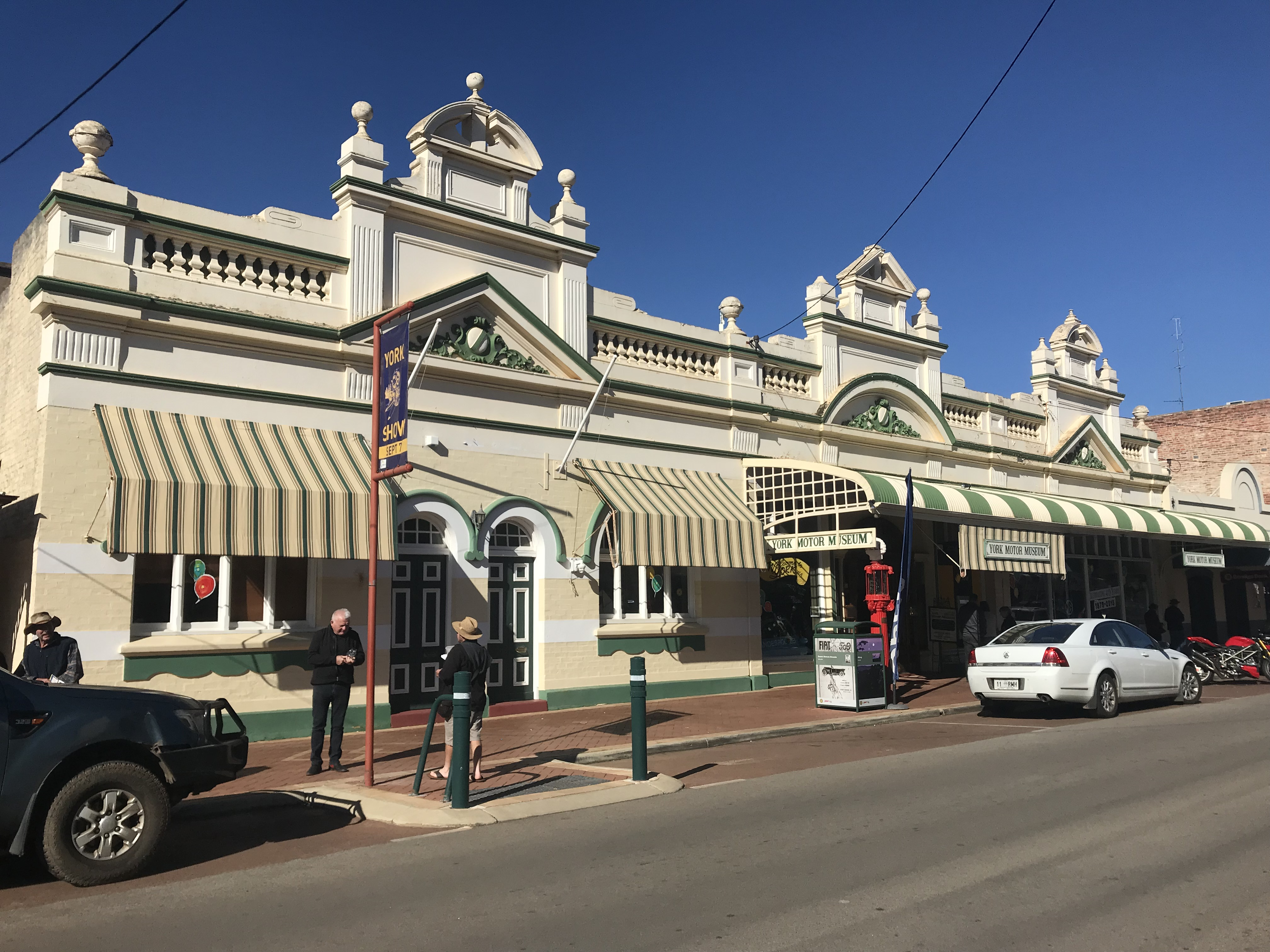
- York Motor Museum
- Interactive map of the York Motor Museum area

General information
- Architectural style: Federation Free Classical
- Location: 116-120 Avon Terrace, York, Western Australia
- Construction started: 1908
- Renovated: 1979

The York Motor Museum is a motor vehicle museum on Avon Terrace in York, Western Australia. It is housed in a group of shops and commercial premises "unified by a classical parapet with classical cappings and balusters" constructed by the Windsor family in 1908.

== Motor Museum ==
The museum was a proposal of James Harwood, who suggested Peter Briggs buy a building for his motor vehicle collection. Harwood and Briggs had been collecting vehicles since the 1960s. For Briggs, that involvement came through local motor sports. In the late 1960s he won the MG Car Club Annual Championship three times and established himself as a broker of vintage vehicles and aeroplanes.

The museum opened on 8 December 1979 with 1,100 square metres of floor space. In 1984, the Museum won the Sir David Brand Award for tourism.

For more than 15 years, the curator of the museum was Peter Harbin, who had a history of motor racing.

The museum offers three main galleries of cars, motor bikes and bicycles, two general areas and one specialising in the history of motor sport. The museum has 60 cars and 16 motor cycles and other vehicles as well as motor memorabilia. A number of vehicles are on loan from the Western Australian Museum and other collectors but most vehicles are still part of Briggs' collection. The York Motor Museum is staffed by volunteers and is open every day from 9am to 4pm. There is an admission fee.

The museum started the York Festival of Motoring, which is now the York Motor Show. Although the museum remains very involved in it, the show is now run by the York Branch of the Veteran Car Club of WA, and draws thousands of car enthusiasts.

Since 2017 the museum has been owned by the non-profit Avon Valley Motor Museum Association and is a community venture.

== Cars ==
Cars in the Museum include:

- Australian Six 1919
- Bédélia 1910
- Benz 1901
- BSA cars 1910
- BMW Isetta 1956
- Cadillac 1906
- Cadillac Eldorado 1958
- Clément 1901
- Falcon XK 1962
- Ford Model T 1910
- Ford Prefect Ute 1951
- Holden FE 1957
- Holden FX 1951
- Holden Torana 1972
- Holsman 1906
- Hupmobile 1910
- Leyland P76 1974
- Maybach 1955
- Morris 1100 1968
- Morris Cowley 1926
- Morris Minor 1948
- Morris Oxford 1954
- Offenhauser 1954
- Oldsmobile 1903
- Packard 1927
- Peugeot Bébé 1913
- Porsche 356
- Rover 1904
- Studebaker 1926
- Subaru 1961
- Toyota Corolla 1978
- Toyota Corona 1967, 1977
- Toyota Prius pre December 1997
- Toyota S800
- Wolsley police car 1948
- Vauxhall Viva 1964
- Volvo 244 1976
- Volkswagen Beetle 1945

== History of the property ==
From the late 1830s to 1859, the property was part of the Government Farm surrounding various government buildings such as the court house and survey office.

As York Town Lot 101, the property was granted by the government to builder, wheelwright and furniture maker George Wansbrough on 12 May 1859 for £10; he constructed a cottage on the site which also had an oven, indicating the original use for the building was as a bakery. The first known baker at this location was Henry Beard in 1863. Henry was only there a short time and then became publican of Monger's York Hotel, before being sent to jail for sheep stealing. He appears to have been replaced by John Thompson.

The property was sold to Joseph Hardey in 1864 for £218. Hardey, of Peninsula Farm, one of the early settlers in Western Australia, died in May 1874 and the property continued to be owned by his executors. (Note: The Eastern Districts Chronicle reported in 1907 that the building was constructed 55 years ago by Joseph Hardey.)

Henry Beard returned to the premises as a baker but then moved out in 1877. The next known tenant of these first buildings is James Archdeacon, who commenced business as a baker in the premises in 1879. Archdeacon left to go to Geraldton in 1883. The bakery was run by Henry Thielemann from 1886. Thielemann was Garman and the son of a baker, and had learned his trade in England. He and then his wife Jeannie continued to run the bakery until 1907. At the time, the building was also occupied by JJ Lawler.

In 1907 the council ordered that both buildings on the property be removed "owing to their dilapidated condition". The building was demolished in December 1907 and property became a vacant block.

One of the problems of the property was that the Avon Terrace footpath was above the building line. In the first half of 1907, the local manager of the Union Bank, J C Windsor asked the York Council to make a decision about lowering the footpath level to a "normal level" to facilitate construction of a "decent building" on the site. "How could people be expected to build if they do not know the proper levels", asked Cr Harris at a council meeting. The council agreed to lower the footpath at a cost of between £70 and £75.

Windsor's wife, Adeline Hannah Windsor, then bought the property from the executors of Hardey's estate on 18 January 1908 for £733 five shillings. At the time, the property was rated as having a capital value of £1,200. Adeline was the daughter of Tasmanian engineer and successful foundry owner Ishmael Ernest Eldon Salisbury and the brother of engineer William Robert Peel Salisbury. Adeline Windsor also owned Central Buildings (and constructed the 1907 section) and a machinery store in Howick Street.

== Construction of Windsor’s buildings ==
Architect Ernest Edward Giles invited tenders for the erection of "semi-detached shops" in York "for JC Windsor Esq" on 12 October 1907. In August 1908, the tender of J W Rebonds was accepted by the Windsors for the erection of offices and shops on the site. "The work will be started almost immediately". Plans were approved by the council on 19 August 1908.

The buildings were constructed by the end of November 1908 as tenants started advertising that they had moved their businesses to "Windsor’s Buildings".

== Tenants ==
Former tenants of the building include:

- J J Lawler bailiff, land agent
- Thorn & Stewart, from 1910 Thorn & Brownlie, machinery agents, being agents for Massey Harris, Dalgety & Co, Splatt, Wall & Co, Chas Atkins
- JA Trask, solicitor
- York Roads Board
- Alfred G Mattiske, draper (1910)
- Mrs Mary Ellen Lansell, women's clothing, frocks and hats (1928)
- M L (Toby) Evans (to 1950) and Roly Iddison (Evans & Iddison from 1950), solicitors
- E T Hick and G E L Wrench, general store, with liquor licence
- Eastern Districts Trading Co, (R M Pemberton and L C Endersby) Ford dealership which took over Thorn's business in September 1936

The petrol bowser in front of the building was placed there by the Eastern Districts Trading Co in 1936. That company requested the council to declare the parking bays in front of the bowsers non-parking but the council declined this request. The main use for the property was as a garage.

== Subsequent owners ==
The property stayed in the Windsor family until the 1960s.

The property was divided into a number of lots. In June 1960,116 Avon Terrace or lot 18 was transferred to Norman, Paul and Sam Christie. In June 1964, the remaining lots were transferred to Roy Pemberton, who then ran the Eastern Districts Trading Co, and his wife Florence.

In 1979, the property was purchased and restored by companies controlled by Peter Briggs to be used as a motor museum for his car collection.

The main entrance doors came from the Perpetual Trustee Buildings in St Georges Terrace, Perth.

The current owner is Avon Valley Motor Museum Association (Inc), a non-profit corporation formed by York motor enthusiasts to buy the museum property from Briggs' companies in 2017.

== Architecture ==
The building is in Federation Free Classical style with a mannerist use of classical features: a parapet with a Palladian balustrade skyline, globe finials, double layer of alternating pediments (the lower pediments having crests), string course, Romanesque arched windows and doors, hood moulds above and aprons below windows. (Note: In 1907, the Windsor family employed architect Ernest Edward Giles (who lived in York from 1907 through to 1908) to design their 1907 additions to Central Buildings.)

== Classification ==
The building is classified by the National Trust of Australia (5 March 1985), is permanently on the Register of the National Estate (21 March 1978), on the Shire register (31 December 1995).
