= Smithy (nickname) =

Smithy is a nickname for:

== People ==
- Charles Kingsford Smith (1897–1935), Australian pioneer aviator
- Ian Smith (1919–2007), Prime Minister of Rhodesia and World War II Royal Air Force pilot
- Mike Smith (broadcaster) (1955–2014), British television and radio presenter, racing driver, pilot and businessman
- W. G. G. Duncan Smith (1914–1996), World War II flying ace

== Fictional characters ==
- Smithy (Mario), the main villain of the video game Super Mario RPG
- Dale Smith (The Bill), in the television series The Bill
- Neil "Smithy" Smith, in the television series Gavin & Stacey
- Smithy, hero of stories by Edgar Wallace
