= John J. Smithies =

Australian artist and arts manager (born 1954)

John G. Smithies
- Born: September 2, 1954 (age 72)
- Education: University of Tasmania; Monash University; Academy of Fine Arts, Karlsruhe
- Occupation: Arts manager

John Geoffrey Smithies (born 1954) is an Australian artist and arts manager. He is a sculptor and installation artist who has been director of the State Film Centre of Victoria, but is best known as the founding director of the Australian Centre for the Moving Image.

== Early life ==
Smithies was born in Tasmania in 1954. He studied at the Tasmanian School of Art, the South Australian School of Art, Monash University and the Academy of Fine Arts, Karlsruhe, Germany.

== Career ==
From 1992, John Smithies was director of the State Film Centre of Victoria, until its merger with Film Victoria in 1997 formed Cinemedia.

At Cinemedia, Smithies was deputy director, with prime responsibility for developing the Australian Centre for the Moving Image (ACMI). ACMI is the premier cinema-culture venue and exhibitor, and the first institution of its type in Australia. It houses exhibition spaces, state-of-the art cinemas, and media production spaces, and the combined access collection of the National Film and Sound Archive and the State film and media collection.

Smithies became the first director and CEO of ACMI in March 2002. He was responsible for opening the new public facilities at Federation Square in Melbourne in October 2002.

After a period of turmoil, with the organisation over budget, Smithies resigned from the Victorian Public Service in 2004. He later said the facility had been forced to open while "under-funded" by the Victorian Government.

In December 2005, Smithies joined the Cultural Development Network (CDN), an independent non-profit organisation that links individual practitioners, community organisations and government across Victoria, as director. About the same time, he recommenced working as an artist (painting and sculpture) with an ongoing interest in digital media and interactive broadcasting.
