= John Smithies =

Englsih missionary (1802–1872)

The Reverend John Smithies (1802–1872) was a Wesleyan Methodist missionary who served in Newfoundland, the Swan River Colony of Western Australia, and Tasmania.

== Early days ==
Born in Yorkshire, Smithies was living in Sheffield in 1827 when he was received into the Methodist ministry. In 1828 the Wesleyan Missionary Society appointed him as a missionary to Newfoundland where he spent nine years. In 1832 he was married to Hannah, his fiancée from England who assisted him in his work of "visiting the sick, leading classes and prayer meetings, as well as conducting the school". In 1837, following sectarian tensions on the island, he returned to England for two years, including 12 months in Derbyshire.

== Western Australia ==
He was assigned to Western Australia in 1839 and, aboard the Prima Donna, landed near Fremantle on 22 June 1840 with his wife and four children, one of whom had been born at sea two weeks earlier. He was immediately introduced to an established fellow missionary, Francis Armstrong. Smithies' double mandate was "the pastoral care of colonists and the Christianization of the Aborigines".

Smithies established a mission near what is now Wanneroo (Note: also called “Guliliup” or “Lake Goolelal” or Alder Lake) in July 1840. The "Perth Native School" was announced with an advertisement in the Inquirer on 18 August 1841, including the Board of Management and the Rules and Regulations.

By 1847, Smithies decided that York would be a better site for a Native Mission than Wanneroo. In 1851, an application was made to Governor Fitzgerald for 40 hectares (100 acres) of good wheat land at York (some kilometres to the north on east side of the Avon River) “to be held for the improvement of the Natives for ever”. (Note: This is the land north of Cowan Street) There was a proviso that if there were no Aboriginals present, the land was to revert to the government. Smithies wrote on 26 September 1851 that eight Aboriginals and one white man had travelled to York from Wanneroo with a bullock team, a journey which had taken three days. The party set up tents and cleared 4 hectares (10 acres) of ground at the selected farm location ready for planting the next year. The mission was to be called Gerald Mission in honour of the Governor. The purpose of the mission was to train Aboriginal children in farm work.

On 13 November 1850, Smithies and his wife visited Eliza Brown, wife of Thomas Brown, at Grass Dale near York, and in one of her letters to her father, she said of Smithies: "S sat fast asleep in his chair nearly all the time of this polite visit."

In 1853, the Government granted the Mission land for the Mission, and a salary of £100 a year for Smithies. A further 3.2 hectares (8 acres) were granted in the York townsite on which to build a schoolroom, a chapel and a Manse and provide Glebe lands. (Note: This was Suburban Lot D, which was bounded by Avon Terrace, Pool Street, Grey Street and Macartney Street.) The Mission was even given a right of commonage, a right to graze sheep, in the township, over an area of 810 hectares (2,000 acres) on which to run “thirty horned cattle”. This was opposed by engineer Solomon Cook who was in the process of constructing his mill in the town. (Note: Cook opposed this because he had been given a contract to supply the convict depot with meat and had been running his herds on the same land.)

So much time and labour was spent on clearing 8.1 to 12.1 hectares (20 to 30 acres) of land and the construction of buildings, and with Rev Smithies often unavoidably away and with few others helping him, the Aboriginal children drifted away from the mission school and the mission failed. The Protector of Natives in York, Walkinshaw Cowan blamed the loss of students from the mission school to "yearning" or "strong particularity" to their own districts but also due to high death rates from influenza at the institution. (Note: Refer to Janet Millett: An Australian Parsonage, 1872, Facsimile edition 1980 UWA, p.129.) In all, the Wesleyan church spent £12,000 on the missions to Aboriginals. (Note: Smithies was still living in York in October 1854 in a seven room house owned by Monger at the south end of the town.)

== Van Diemen's Land ==
Smithies was transferred to Van Diemen's Land (Tasmania) in 1855 and remained there until his death in 1872.
