= Solomon Cook =

American engineer

Solomon Cook (1812-1871) was an American engineer, blacksmith and shipwright. He constructed a substantial mill and one of Western Australia's first steam engines at York.

== Early days ==
Solomon Cook was born in Penobscot, Maine in 1812. He was the son of a blacksmith.

== Whaling and Albany ==
He is supposed to have deserted an American whaler at or near Albany in 1837. In 1847, he was partner in a shore-base whaling station with John Thomas and John Craiggie. This was dissolved on 24 May 1847.

In October 1847, Solomon Cook was granted a sawyer's licence by the Government Resident, Albany. He also appears to have worked as a carpenter and blacksmith in Albany. Solomon Cook was naturalised (became a British subject) in March 1849, along with Dom Rosendo Salvado.

== Canning Bridge ==
His first major project after leaving Albany was to construct Canning Bridge. The first pile was driven on 10 September 1849 and the bridge was approaching completion by the end of November 1849. To complete the job, Solomon Cook is credited with having made a pile driving machine or monkey from colonial materials which was larger than usual, being 8 feet square. Unfortunately the Superintendent of Works, Henry Trigg formed the view that some of the piles had not been driven correctly and had to be corrected. The cost of doing this was deducted from Cook's fee.

== York ==
Solomon Cook then came to York and set up business as a wheelwright, coach-builder and iron founder. He obtained a "Publican's Spirit Licence" on 11 February 1851 for a pub called the "Dusty Miller" in a building which still exists in Christie Retreat (at the rear of 158 Avon Tce). Cook sold his pub to William Dunham in April 1852 who expanded the premises. Cook then tried to fund the construction of a bridge across the Avon River at York. In January 1851, he complained that he had expended a considerable amount of money in preparatory expenses in an amount that exceeded the subscriptions.

== Cook's Mill ==
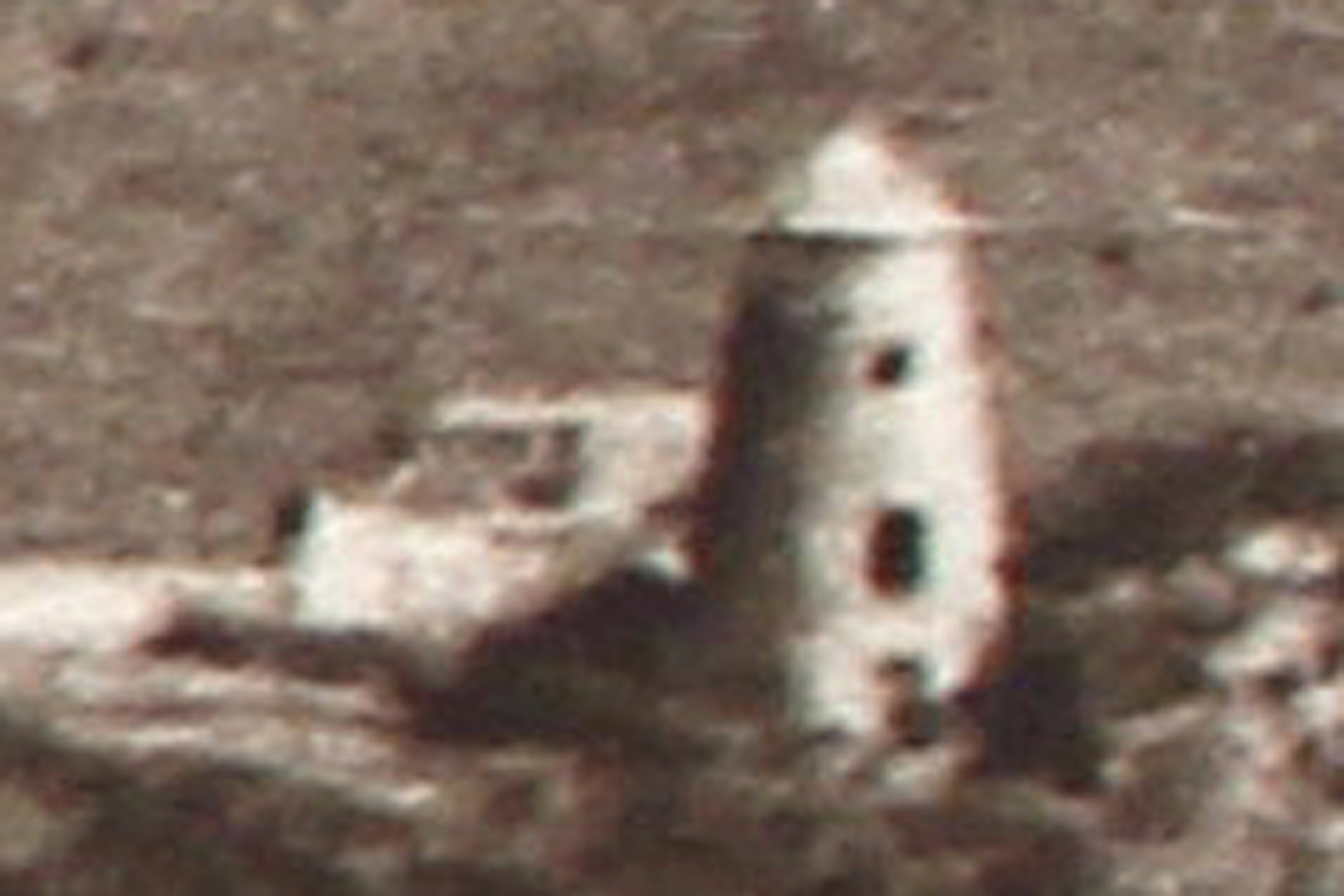
Solomon Cook's mill from a York panorama in about October 1877, taken by James Manning for the Paris Exhibition 1878.

Cook bought York Town Lot 4 on 17 July 1850 for £10. This is the property currently occupied by York Homeware and Garden Centre. Cook immediately started construction of a flour mill on the site. The foundation stone for the mill was laid on 22 July 1850. The mill was said to be 40 feet high, and the material granite, and the project was being funded by Solomon Cook himself. Cook borrowed £400 from merchants John Barker and Thomas Pope for this project.

The walls of the "windmill" were nearly completed by mid-October 1850, and it was due to be completed in January 1851. "The architect is Mr Solomon Cook, and both the workmanship and design are such as do no discredit to that individual's established reputation for ingenuity and skill."

== Steam Engine ==
Solomon Cook then constructed a steam engine for the mill. This was not the first commercial steam engine made in the Colony, there was a steam-driven flour mill and saw mill built at Guildford in the mid-1840s by Walkinshaw Cowan.

A correspondent reported in May 1853: "Mr S. Cook's steam engine, constructed on an entirely new principle, was set to work, on trial, on Tuesday last, and appeared fully to answer the expectations formed of it".

He was assisted in the construction of the engine by "John Stevenson".

In her book, An Australian Parsonage, Janet Millet refers to Solomon Cook's steam engine: "They manfully hammered a lot of old tire-iron into the form of a boiler and actually succeeded in making their engine grind corn but it was so noisy over its work and devoured such a large quantity of fuel that it soon wore out its own constitution and became useless".

The mill appears in an engraving in the London Illustrated News based on a drawing by Captain Edward Henderson. This shows a windmill with arms.

== The weather vane ==
Steam power resulted in the removal of the arms of the windmill and their replacement by a weathervane and cockerel. This occurred by 1858 as the vane and cockerel were referred to in a March 1858 letter to the paper. The weather vane was most probably made by blacksmith Henry Stevens, who was a tenant of Cook, and who was also a whitesmith. The mill with weathervane and cockerel also appears in a drawing by Richard Goldsmith Meares, which was most likely drawn after his retirement in March 1858. The weathercock is also referred to by Janet Millet in her book An Australian Parsonage (page 52) on her arrival in York in 1863. This weather vane was moved to the York post office building around 1900 when the mill was demolished and is still there, but without the cockerel.

== Constructing boats and machinery ==
Solomon Cook moved to the Swan River and continued to build steam engines for boats. He was one of the first men to start business as a wheelwright, coach-builder and iron-founder in Perth, on part of the land now occupied by Myers in Wellington Street. He made the first corn-stripper in the colony and was the first man in the colony to use a steam-hammer. He also constructed a reaping and thrashing machine which was an improvement on that of Mr Ridley from South Australia, who went on to sell them all across Australia. However, Cook's machine covered an acre an hour, cost between £70 and £80, and required three or four horses and two men to operate it. A York correspondent commented in 1864, the machine was "only available, as regards price and power, for the gentleman farmer".

While in York, Cook designed and built an iron-framed wool press for James Broun of Avondale Park, for pressing wool into bales.

== Death ==
Cook died of dysentery in 1871 at the age of 55.
