= York Post Office =

Building in York, Western Australia

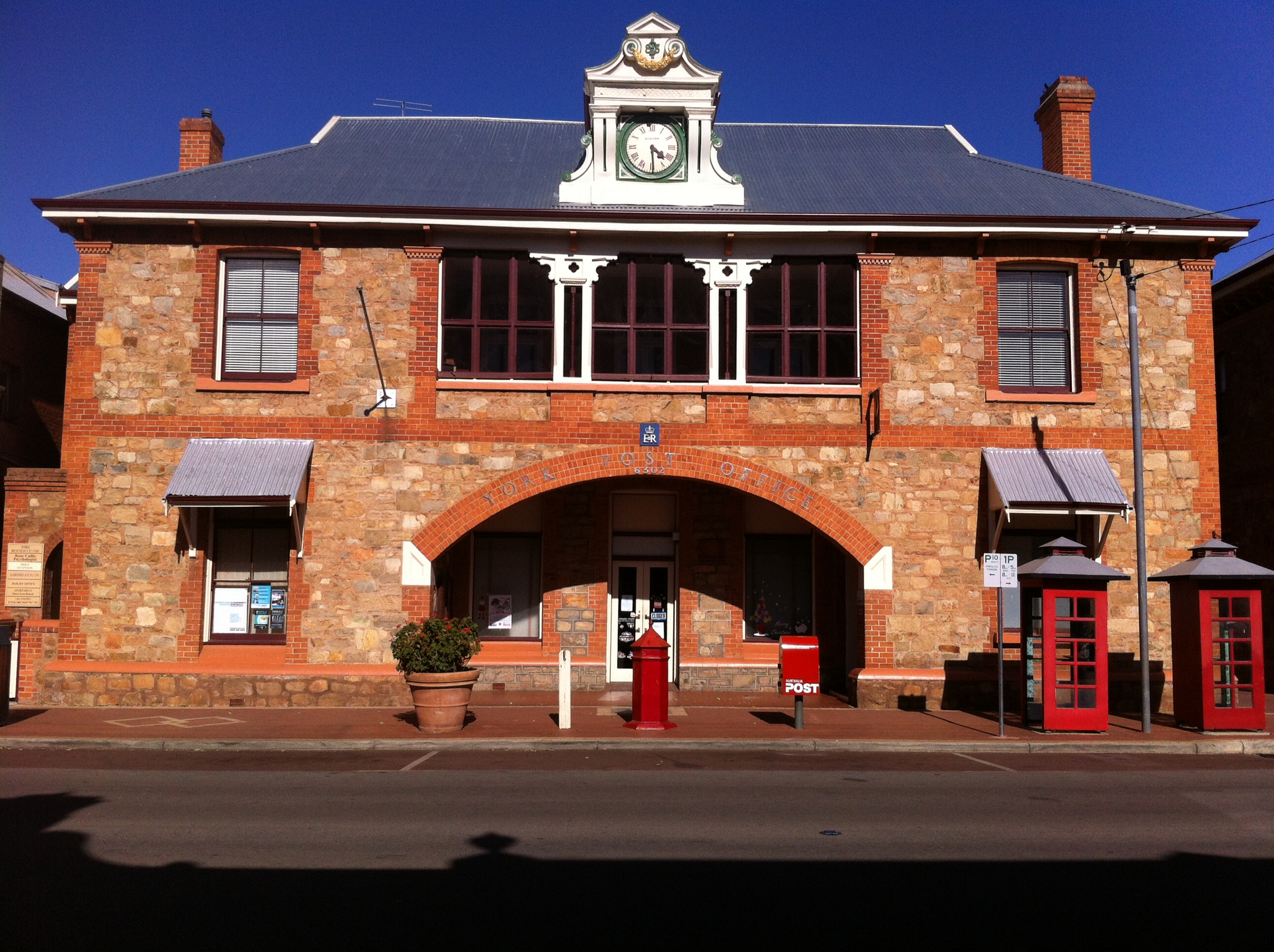
- York Post Office
- Interactive map of the York Post Office area
- Alternative names: York Post & Telegraph Office

General information
- Location: 134 Avon Tce, York, Western Australia
- Coordinates: 31.8884°S 116.7686°E
- Construction started: 1893

Design and construction
- Architect: George Temple-Poole

Western Australia Heritage Register
- Type: State Registered Place
- Designated: 9 February 1996
- Reference no.: 2855

York Post Office, on Avon Terrace in York, Western Australia, is the oldest surviving two storey post and telegraph building in Western Australia, and forms part of the heritage-listed town centre complex with the Court House and Police Station (1895). The site has been continuously used as a post office since 1866. The York Post Office was built in response to the town's growing importance as a rural centre and as the town and railway centre closest to the goldfields in the Yilgarn during the initial period of the Western Australian gold rush.

This Federation Arts and Crafts style (or Federation Free Style) building was designed by Government Architect George Temple-Poole as a post and telegraph office and residence for the post-master, and was constructed in 1893. The building is constructed of rough cut local stone and brick with a corrugated iron roof. The builders were Thorn, Bower, and Stewart. Locally quarried stones were carefully selected for each stage of the work and a horse powered block and tackle was used to raise them in a strong box to the upper level.

The building replaced the first post office on the same site, a single storey Victorian Georgian style building with a shingle roof, constructed in 1866.

In the mid-1890s, the people of York successfully "petitioned the government to have a town clock placed prominently in the main street", and a dormer clock was installed at the York Post Office. It is a turret timepiece manufactured by J. W. Benson, of London, in 1895 (the firm founded by James William Benson), and so inscribed. The clock at the York Post Office failed to be reliable in the late 1890s, and "a public meeting was called to complain that the clock never worked".

The weather vane from Solomon Cook's 1852 mill, (Note: probably made by Cook's tenant Henry Stevens the whitesmith.) which was situated on the corner of Avon Terrace and Macartney Street, where the (York Home) hardware store is now situated, was installed on the roof at the York Post Office in the early 1900s (without the cockerel). The addition of the exchange room, in 1922, is the only major change to the building.

The upstairs residence is now used as offices and also has an apartment for short term rental. Former office occupants include John Kinsella.

The building is classified by the National Trust of Australia, is permanently on the Register of the National Estate (21 March 1978), on the Shire register (31 December 1995), and permanently on the State Register of Heritage Places (9 February 1996).
