= Dinsdale's Shoe Emporium =

Building in York, Western Australia

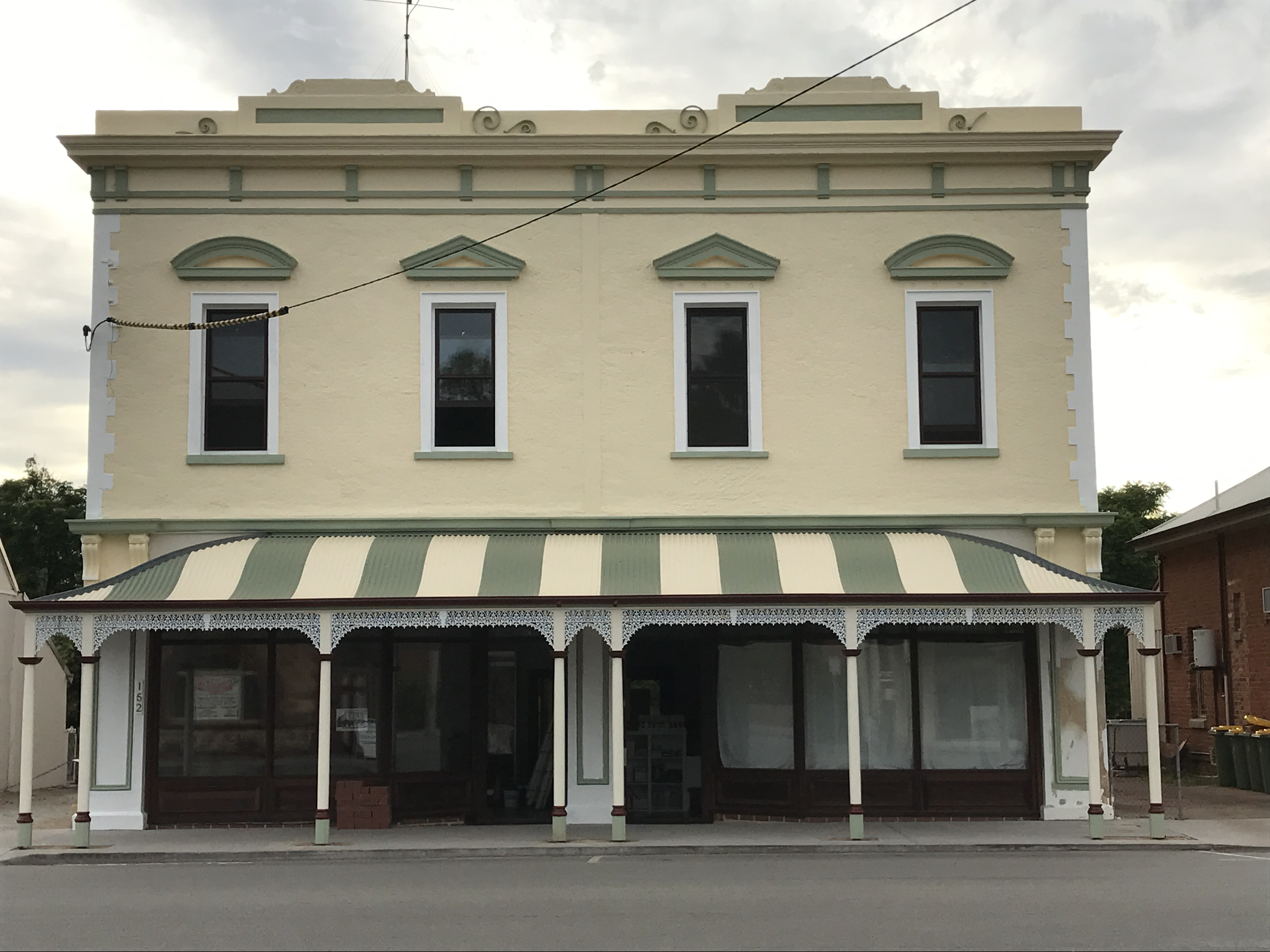
- After the 2017 renovation, including reinstated verandah.
- Interactive map of the Dinsdale's Shoe Emporium area
- Alternative names: Gallery 152, Botanicalia, Kookaburra's

General information
- Location: 152 Avon Terrace, York, Western Australia
- Coordinates: 31.8873°S 116.7685°E
- Construction started: 1886
- Completed: 1887
- Renovated: 2017

Design and construction
- Architecture firm: James William Wright

References
- York municipal inventory

Dinsdale's Shoe Emporium is a heritage-listed building on Avon Terrace in York, Western Australia, constructed by a former mayor.

In 1885 bootmaker William Dinsdale engaged architect James William Wright of Wright & Paterson to design a two-storey building with shops below and residences above. The building was constructed in 1887 by contractors Thorn, Bower and Stewart.

The building was used as a boot, shoe and saddle store and factory. Lettering from Dinsdale's original wall banner is still visible at the front of the store. The store also has its original 1887 shop counter.

In 1888, Dinsdale travelled throughout Australia to secure new machinery for his business, which was expanded to include saddles and harnesses.

Part of the building or the rear building was being used as the Shire Council Office in 1892.

The building is in Victorian Free Classical style. The building has alternating pediments.

Dinsdale was Mayor of York from 3 December 1896 to November 1898, and again from 20 November 1901 to 1907. He became insolvent in 1908 and the property was transferred to his brother Alfred.

The building was leased to Charlotte Pyke, who opened a lodging house known as the Temperance Hotel. Photographs of the building from this time show a two-storeyed verandah.

The building is listed on the Shire municipal inventory (31 December 1995), classified by the National Trust of Australia (1 April 1984) and on the Register of the National Estate (21 March 1978). The façade of the building was restored in 2017.
