= James William Wright =

Australian architect and politician (1854 - 1917)

James Wright

Member of the Legislative Council of Western Australia
- In office 22 May 1902 – 21 May 1908
- Preceded by: Henry Saunders
- Succeeded by: Arthur Jenkins
- Constituency: Metropolitan Province

Personal details
- Born: 9 October 1854 Chiswick, Middlesex, England
- Died: 3 October 1917 (aged 62) Perth, Western Australia, Australia

James William Wright (9 October 1854 – 3 October 1917) was an Australian architect, civil engineer, and politician. He established the first private architectural practice in Western Australia in 1884, which now operates as Cameron Chisholm Nicol. Wright also served in the state's Legislative Council from 1902 to 1908, representing Metropolitan Province.

== Early life and career ==
Wright was born in Chiswick, Middlesex, England, to Elizabeth Jane (née Kensett) and James William Wright (senior). He attended King's College London, and then in 1876 moved to South Australia to work as an assistant to Henry Coathupe Mais, the colony's engineer-in-chief. Wright went into private practice in Adelaide in 1878, and completed contracts for sewerage works and for a railway bridge on the line to Nairne. After taking an extended trip to Europe in 1880 and 1881, he moved to Western Australia, where he had been awarded a contract for a portion of the Eastern Railway (running from Guildford to Chidlow).

In 1884, after completing his railway contract, Wright remained in Western Australia and opened an office in Perth, becoming the colony's only architect in private practice. He was a prominent figure in the establishment of the West Australian Architects' Association in 1887. Wright's firm was initially known as just J. W. Wright & Co., later Wright & Paterson, but in 1906 it became Wright, Powell & Cameron (after he accepted two other men as partners). It has endured to the present day, and is now known as Cameron Chisholm Nicol. Notable buildings completed by Wright include:

- Woodbridge House (1884), built for Charles Harper on the banks of the Swan River near Guildford
- Masonic Hall (formerly Oddfellows Hall), York (1887)
- Dinsdale's Shoe Emporium, York (1887)
- Union Bank, Fremantle (1889; supervisory role only)
- WACA Ground (1895; first grandstand)
- Federal Hotel, West Perth (1896; demolished to make way for Mitchell Freeway
- Ascot Racecourse (1903–1905; grandstand, public enclosure, and jockeys' quarters)
- York Town Hall (1911)

== Politics and later life ==
In 1895, Wright was appointed to the Central Board of Health (a forerunner of the current Department of Health), where he served for fourteen years. He was elected to parliament at the 1902 Legislative Council election, winning one of the three seats in Metropolitan Province. Wright defeated the sitting member, Henry Saunders, by just twelve votes, although Saunders was able to continue his political career a few months later when he was appointed to the Senate. There were no organised political parties in the Legislative Council at the time of Wright's election, but during his campaign he identified himself as a liberal, and promised to work to lower taxation and to end restrictions on business hours.

Wright served a single six-year term in the Legislative Council, retiring at the 1908 election and being succeeded by Arthur Jenkins. He was suffering financial difficulties by that time, and in 1909 was taken through bankruptcy proceedings, as a result of which he had to sell his mansion in Peppermint Grove (built in 1894). Wright died in Perth in October 1917, aged 62. He had married Ada Light in 1884, with whom he had two children.

== See also ==
- List of Australian architects
- Members of the Western Australian Legislative Council
