= Richard Goldsmith Meares =

Australian police officer

- Born: April 1780; County Westmeath, Ireland
- Died: 9 January 1862 (aged 81); Western Australia
- Occupations: Landholder, Public official
- Known for: Early settler of the Swan River Colony

Richard Goldsmith Meares (1780–1862) was an early landholder and public official at the Swan River Colony in Western Australia.

== Early life ==
Richard, born April 1780, was the son of William Meares of Killinboy, County Westmeath, and Elizabeth Goldsmith; his family's background was Anglo-Irish, his father's businesses were concerned with wine. He attended the Royal Academy to pursue an early interest in art, but a career as an officer in the British Army began after the outbreak of war with France.

Meares' commissions began as ensign with the North Yorkshire militia in 1803, a promotion to the regular 7th Fusiliers followed soon after that; he eventually acquired the rank of cornet and sub-lieutenant in July 1810 with the 2nd Life Guards. His service included participating the Peninsula War, and a significant involvement in the Battle of Waterloo. He retired from his last position as a lieutenant while with the 8th Regiment of Foot in 1818, and occupied himself with art and horticulture.

== Western Australia ==
In 1829 Meares invested £500 with Thomas Peel and left England aboard the ship Gilmore as one of Peel's settlers bound for the Swan River Colony in Western Australia. Along with the other settlers, his family initially stayed in makeshift arrangements at Clarence. After seeking assistance from Sir George Arthur, 1st Baronet, he was offered a generous parcel at Van Diemen's Land, but moved instead to the upper reaches of the Swan in 1832. He was appointed to the position of police superintendent of Guildford, Western Australia on 22 August 1834, shortly after the government's formation of ex-servicemen into a mounted police force.

Meares' name, and that of his son, Seymour, is recorded in the diary of George Fletcher Moore as part of the expedition engaged in the Pinjarra massacre in October of the same year. His position as a law enforcement officer ended when the Mounted Corps was disbanded the following year, and he took the role of Justice of the Peace then Government Resident for the Murray district in 1837. After acquiring land in the Avon region, he became Resident Magistrate for the York district until he retired in 1859. The region was beset with disputes between local people and those of neighbouring districts while under his administration, his nature and correspondence being described as quirky or quarrelsome; the publicity generated by these was a source of concern to the establishment at Perth. His name is reported as Captain Meares in contemporary papers, said to be pride in the rank he had purchased in the prestigious 2nd Life guards. A solicitor gave this account of proceedings,

"In another case before the same magistrate, in which Mr. Seymour Meares, son of Capt. Meares, was complainant, and Thomas White, a lately imported Englishman, was defendant, on a charge of breach of contract, the father insisted on sitting as a magistrate, stating, "that he wished to see justice done to his son." This conduct was persisted in, although protested against by the defendant. Mr. H. Landor and Capt. Meares, after hearing the son's statement, and reading some letters from Mr. M. Clarkson, also protested against because the writer was not present to be cross-examined, sentenced White to two months imprisonment in Fremantle Jail, in presence of his weeping wife and an infant baby at her breast, and a crowd of amazed spectators."—Letter in Perth Gazette, January 1843.

Meare's wife was Ellen, or Eleanor, née Seymour, born at Newcastle upon Tyne, whom he had married in 1808; she died at the colony in 1854. Their eldest son was Seymour Meares, who later settled at Pinjarra; of the earlier incident there he reported seeing eighteen graves, the subject of ongoing discourse in Western Australian history.

He died 9 January 1862, and is buried in the town's cemetery.

== Legacy ==
Richard Goldsmith Meares last years were in the Avon River valley. His role as the government's Resident was extended to the collection of taxes and statistician, and the foundation of local governance and societies. Meares helped establish the York Fair, and served on other committees, his equestrian interests helped conceive the York Race Club and another for the importation of thoroughbreds. Having brought his interest in horticulture to gardens at Guildford, he also introduced vineyards and a novel barley crop to York.

Brief notices are given on Meares' able draughtsmanship, his sketches, and other works. The well-appointed house at Guildford was named "Bower". A single artwork by Meares remains, a drawing of a mill at York, though records of others, since destroyed, include one of his residence at York. The walls of his residence, a typical rammed earth construction, contained murals by Meares, depicting scenes from Waterloo and "the battle of Pinjarrah". A character sketch of Meares in the early colony was given in an article in Cornhill Magazine by Edmund Du Cane. His legacy to botany as a collector includes forwarding of material for James Mangles (1786–1867) around the years 1835–42.

== Sources ==
- Moore, George Fletcher (1884), Diary of Ten Years Eventful Life of an Early Settler in Western Australia, London: M. Walbrook, LCCN 43042806, OCLC 5343980, OL 7030461M, Wikidata Q19081637
