= York Town Hall =

Building in York, Western Australia

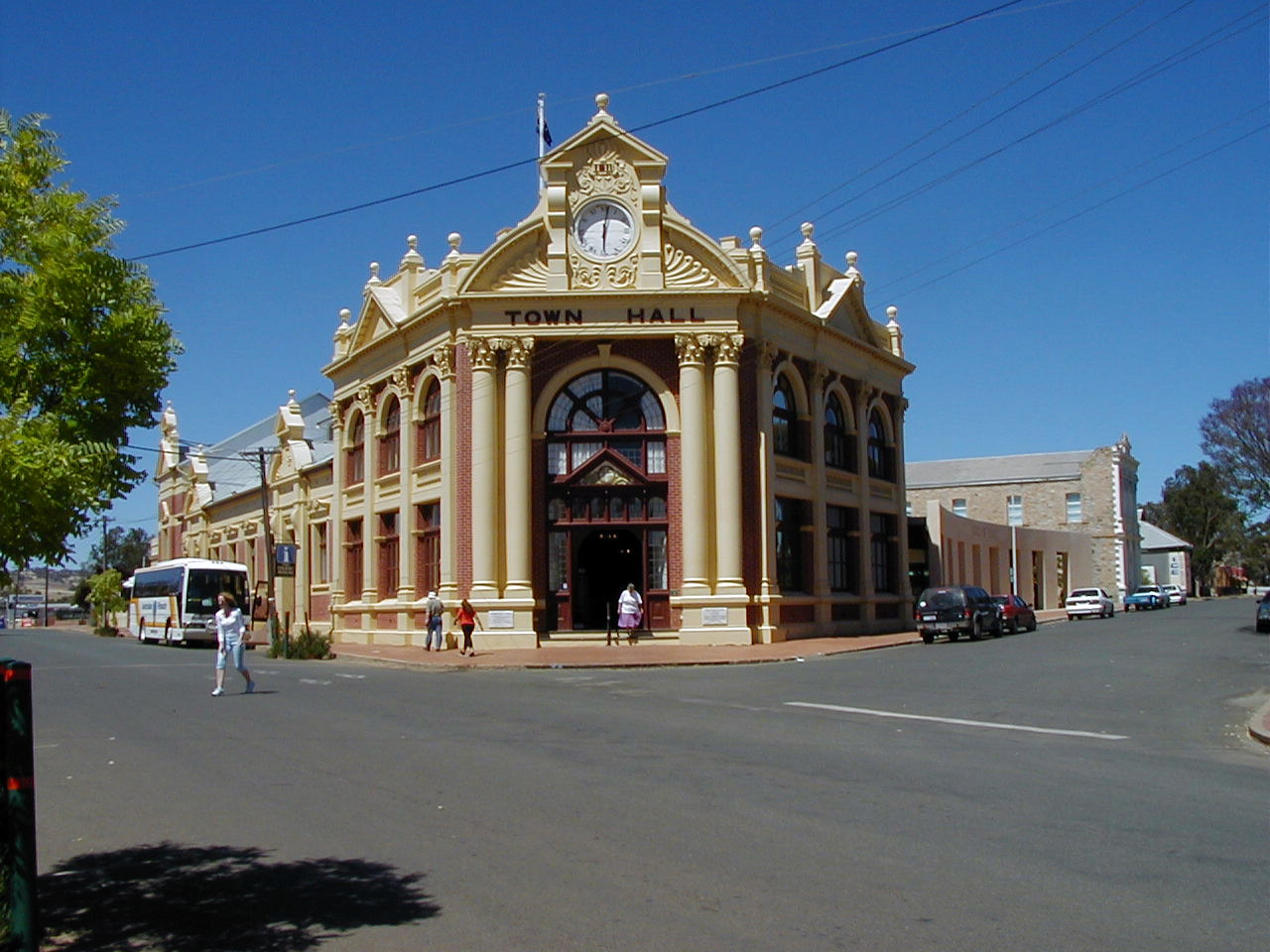
- York Town Hall in 2001
- Interactive map of the York Town Hall area

General information
- Type: Heritage listed building
- Location: York, Western Australia
- Coordinates: 31.89160°S 116.76818°E

Western Australia Heritage Register
- Type: State Registered Place
- Designated: 7 February 1997
- Reference no.: 2880

York Town Hall is a heritage listed town hall in York, Western Australia, located in Avon Terrace. At the time of its construction, it was claimed to be the largest public hall in Western Australia, with an interior floor space measuring 100 by 50 feet (30 m × 15 m).

Constructed in 1911, it is an example of Edwardian opulence. Architecturally, while it may be considered to be in Federation Free Classical style, with its "spectacular potpouri of architectural styles" and its "soaring columns topped with a decorative pediment and above the main entrance, a high semi-circular window in Romanesque manner", its features are so exaggerated that it is more in Victorian Mannerist style.

It was designed by Wright, Powell and Cameron (the firm headed by James William Wright).

The lobby has a sweeping staircase constructed by local craftsmen from jarrah timber salvaged from the Mechanics Institute building, which had been demolished to make way for the Town Hall.

During construction, the last of six large steel pillars in the main section of the hall still had to be secured firmly, but lunchtime came, and the workmen took lunch. During lunch, a willy-willy brought down the unsecured principal and the other five. All had to be completely replaced.

The Town Hall was opened on 30 November 1911 by the newly elected Labor Premier John Scaddan.

Historian Tony Clack comments: "...the erection of the Town Hall was York's swan song. Two and a half year's later the world was at war and York never recovered the confidence that was expressed in the construction of the Town Hall." The cost of construction was £9,027 for which the Council borrowed £7,000, and for many years, the Council struggled to pay the debt on the loans.

It was designed to be large enough to generate income from renting the hall to travelling picture-show men and was utilised as a picture show venue early in its history.

In 1926, the Town Hall was condemned by the Public Health Department and was closed down, due to a settling of the foundations. To remedy this, expensive steel reinforcing was introduced to support the walls, and steel braces and ties were installed on the roof trusses.

In 1933 at the annual St Patrick’s Ball, in the company of his young companions, at 11:30 pm, a 16 year old Terrance Rowan stood on the railing of the dress circle balcony, overbalanced and crashed to the dance floor some 15 feet (5 m) below. He landed head first and broke his neck, and died early next morning.

The clock was installed in 1952 and the building extended up Joaquina Street in 1997, completing the architect's original vision.

In the 2000s it was refurbished and renovated, and the stage was renovated in 2019.

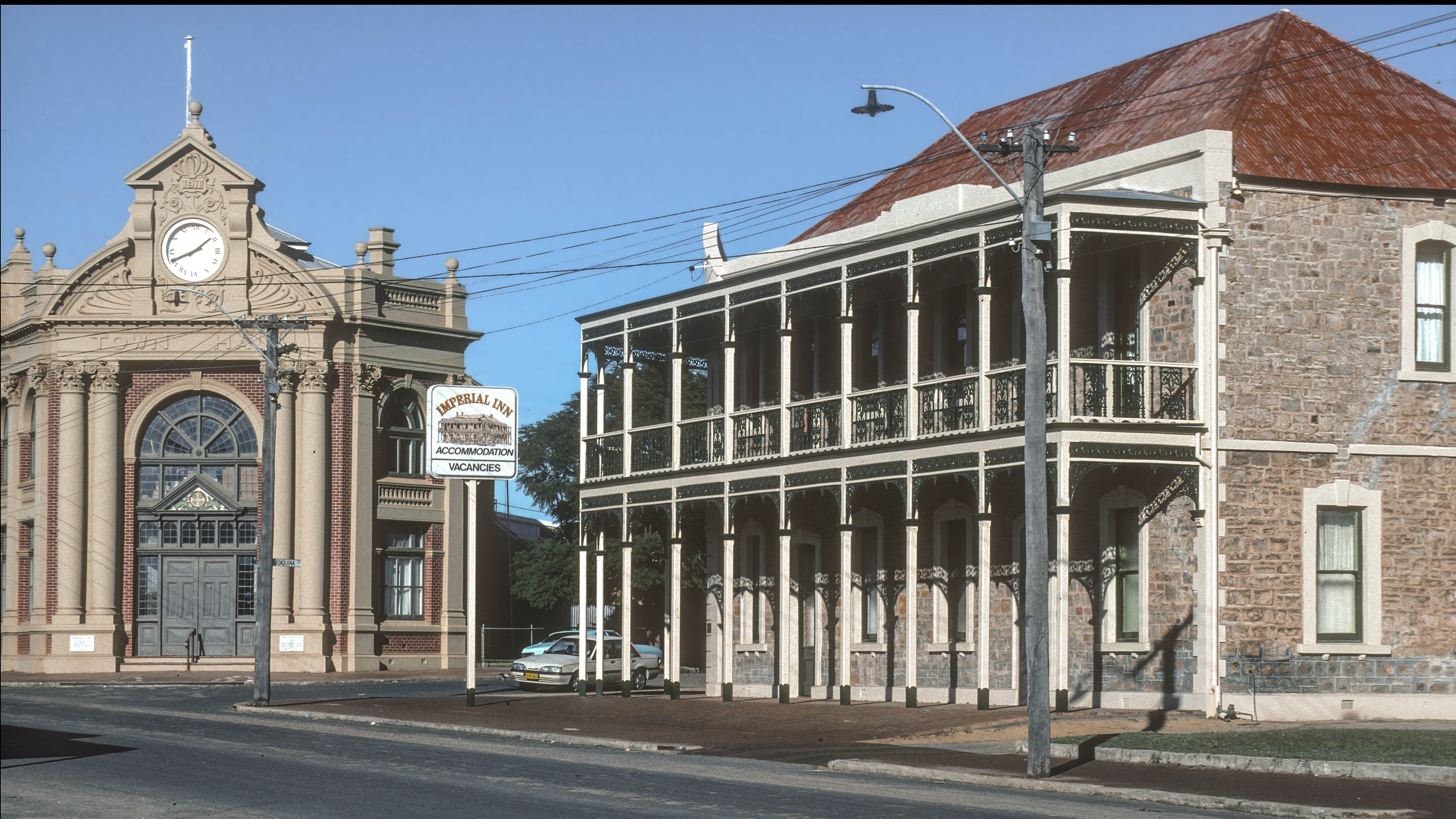
Imperial Inn and York Town Hall

The building is:

- permanently on the Register of the National Estate (21 March 1978)
- classified by the National Trust of Australia (1 November 1976)
- on the Shire municipal inventory (31 December 1995)
- permanently on the State Register of Heritage Places (7 February 1997)
