= 1968 Meckering earthquake =

Magnitude 6.5 earthquake in Australia

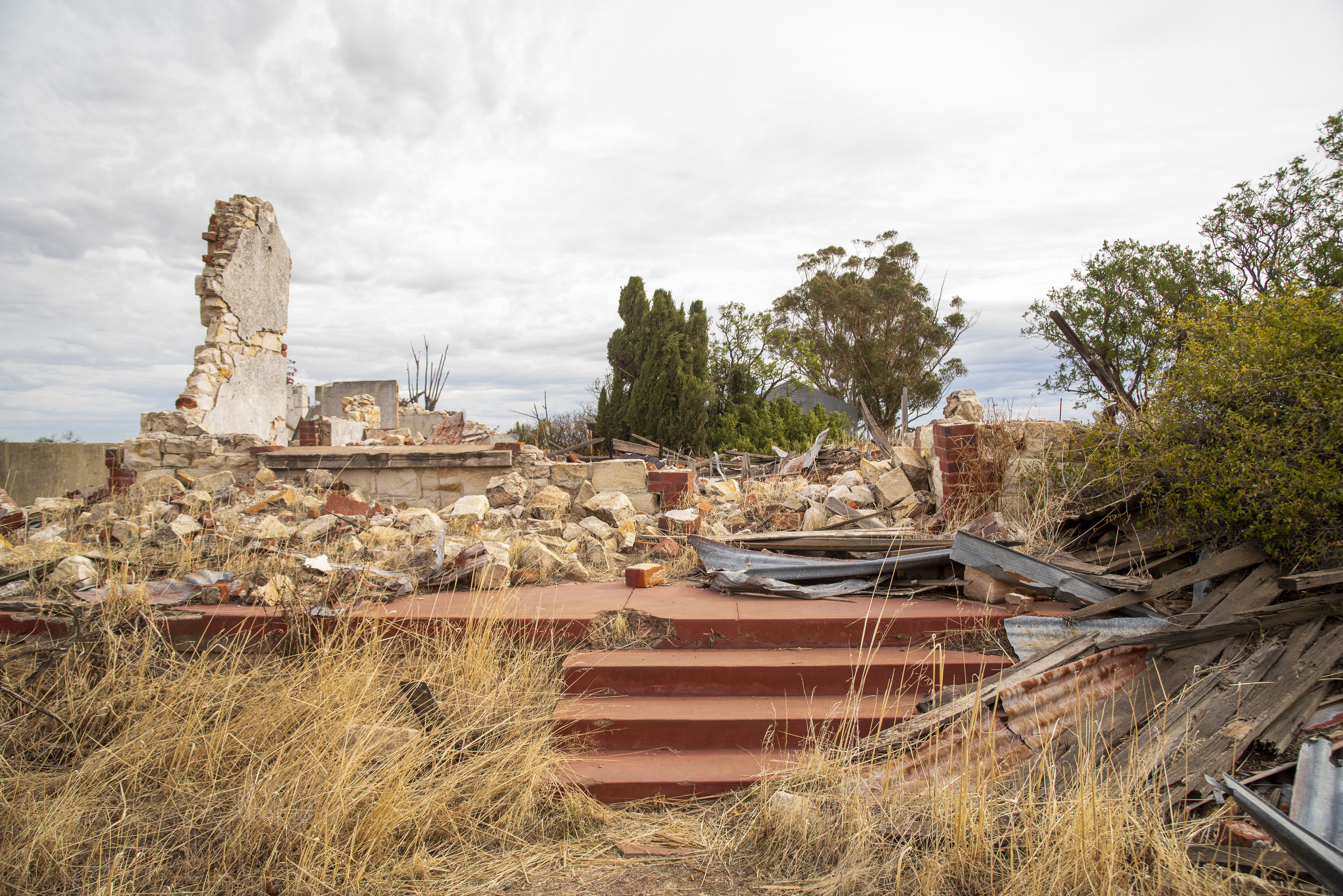
- Salisbury Homestead one of the buildings destroyed in the earthquake

- Location within Australia
- UTC time: 1968-10-14 02:58:52
- ISC event: 815895
- USGS-ANSS: ComCat
- Local date: 14 October 1968
- Local time: 10:58:52
- Magnitude: 6.5 M_{w}
- Depth: 15 km (9 mi)
- Epicenter: 31.57°S 117.07°E
- Fault: Meckering Fault
- Type: Reverse
- Total damage: $2.2 million
- Max. intensity: MMI IX (Violent)
- Casualties: 20–28 injured

The Western Australian town of Meckering was struck by an earthquake on 14 October 1968. The earthquake occurred at 10:58:52 local time, with a moment magnitude of 6.5 and a maximum Mercalli intensity of IX (Violent). Total damage amounted to $2.2 million with 20–28 injured. Monday, October 14, 1968, also happened to be a public holiday in Western Australia observing the Queen's Birthday.

== Earthquake ==
The shallow fault was about 32 kilometres (20 mi) long around the western side of the town of Meckering. It damaged roads including the Great Eastern Highway, the Eastern Goldfields Railway and the Goldfields water pipeline. It formed a fault scarp up to 1.5 metres (5 ft) high with overthrusting to the west of up to 2 metres (7 ft) and strike-slip displacement of up to 0.9 metres (3 ft).

== Damage ==
The earthquake affected structures in Perth, the capital of Western Australia 130 km west of Meckering. It occurred in mid-morning of a public holiday, the Queen's Birthday and theatres were packed with children.

=== Salisbury Homestead ===
The Salisbury Homestead was built by Harry Sermon in 1904 using local stone with a timber and corrigated iron roof. The property would later be owned by the Snooke family. The earthquake destroyed the house, Alice Snooke rescued her 2-year-old daughter from the earthquake. The homestead was abandoned due to the damage and as of 2024 remains as a memorial to the event.

== See also ==
- List of earthquakes in 1968
- List of earthquakes in Australia
- South West seismic zone
