= Architecture of Western Australia =

The architecture of Western Australia has been influenced by the legacy of being an English colony in the late nineteenth century.

Colonial architecture remains scattered through the capital city Perth, and regional centres.

Despite the separation from the rest of Australia by distance, the influence of Australian styles was marked upon building and designing in Western Australia.

Notable architects include those who were Principal architect:

- 1884 - 1905 {James William WRIGHT]
- 1891 – 1897 George Temple-Poole
- 1897 – 1905 John Harry Grainger
- 1905 – 1917 Hillson Beasley
- 1917 – 1927 William Hardwick

== Perth redevelopment (1960s–1980s) ==
British businessman and property developer Alistair McAlpine (1942–2014) was critical of the tone of development in Perth, especially along the "once-beautiful" St Georges Terrace, noting how: "Where once the architects of Western Australia benefitted from their isolation and built small new buildings in scale with their town, in the 1980s they started to read glossy architectural magazines and build glossy buildings".

== See also ==
- List of tallest buildings in Perth
