= Public Works Department (Western Australia) =

Defunct government instrumentality of Western Australia

Agency overview
- Formed: 1 January 1901
- Dissolved: 31 December 1984
- Superseding agency: Building Management Authority
- Jurisdiction: Western Australia

The Public Works Department (PWD) was a Government of Western Australia agency responsible for providing and maintaining public infrastructure such as dams, water supplies, schools, hospitals, harbours and other public buildings in Western Australia. It was dissolved on 31 December 1984, with its responsibilities reassigned to other departments and corporate entities.

== History ==
Construction of infrastructure in the Swan River Colony was originally overseen by Henry Willey Reveley, an English civil engineer. Reveley arrived at the colony in 1829 and was initially employed without pay, however in 1830 the matter was raised and a salary awarded retrospectively. He continued in this position until 1839, completing structures such as the Round House in Fremantle and the Old Perth Courthouse in Perth using convict and military labour, along with contract labour. He was also involved with building roads and bridges, jetties and tunnels.

Reveley's position was downgraded after his departure and his replacement, Henry Trigg, was given the title of Superintendent of Public Works. He held this role from 1839 until 1851, with most of his early work focused on jetties, The Perth Causeway and the Rottnest Island settlement.

Henry Trigg was succeeded as Superintendent of Public Works in 1851 by James Austin. Austin served for two years until 1853 when he resigned and was replaced by Richard Roach Jewell who was given the title Clerk of Works of the Colonial Works Office, where he served until he retired in 1884. James Manning was also made a Clerk of Works and worked in parallel with Jewell, who worked in Perth while Manning worked from Fremantle. Jewell had been promoted to Superintendent of Public Works before he retired and in 1880 the department was called the Works and Railways Department.

Recommendations made in 1884 were implemented in 1885 which resulted in John Arthur Wright being appointed as Director of Public Works and Engineer in Chief. George Temple-Poole was made the Superintendent of Works and Clayton Mason was made General Manager of Railways and Maintenance Engineer. Upon Wright's resignation in 1889, it was decided to split the Works and Railways with Mason becoming Acting Commissioner of Railways and Poole becoming Acting Director of Public Works. In 1891, Charles Yelverton O'Connor arrived in Perth to take up the role of Engineer in Chief.

=== Formation of the Department ===
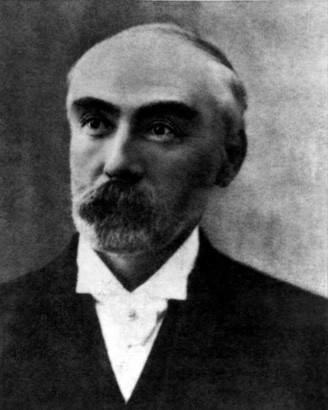
The first head of the PWD, Charles Yelverton O'Connor

The department started on 1 January 1901 with O'Connor as the Engineer in Chief having succeeded the Department of Works & Buildings.

==== Leaders ====
Engineer in Chief:

- Charles Yelverton O'Connor 1901–1902
- C.S.R. Palmer 1902–1904
- James Thompson 1904–1925

Director of Public Works

- Russell Dumas 1941–1951

Principal Architects

- John Harry Grainger 1897–1905
- Hillson Beasley 1905–1917
- William Hardwick 1917–1927
- John Melvin James Tait 1927–1930
- Albert Clare 1930–1960
- Walter Green 1960–1967
- Leonard Walters 1967–1968
- Stanley Cann 1968–1980
- William Bateman 1980–1985

For more details, refer to Western Australia Government Architect.

==== Department buildings ====
For a considerable time, the department was housed in buildings adjacent to and extending west from The Barracks Arch in Perth.

In 1966, both the PWD and Metropolitan Water Board moved into new office accommodation at Dumas House, on Kings Park Road in West Perth.

Mechanical and Electrical workshops of the PWD were located for a long time in the former Jewell Street in East Perth. Another major workshop was in Welshpool. Most country towns had depots and offices designed to service staff based regionally, which were built to cater for the specific tasks of the workforce.

=== End of an era ===
The Public Works Department became the Building Management Authority on 1 January 1985.

== Responsibilities ==
=== Agriculture ===
The three supposed rabbit-proof fences were initially constructed by the Agriculture Department but after inspections of 465 miles (748 km) of completed fence a decision was made that it was generally substandard so the construction was handed over to the PWD in 1904. The department needed to strengthen 145 miles (233 km) of the fence before resuming construction. The project was overseen by Richard John Anketell who set up a workforce comprising nine construction parties, 189 camels and 128 horses.

The PWD was also responsible for providing mechanical and electrical services to numerous agricultural research stations based remotely around Western Australia. The department also built and maintained the Camballin Irrigation Scheme which was constructed to grow rice in the Kimberley, as well as numerous other irrigation infrastructure around the state.

Responsibility for agricultural matters and the rabbit proof fence were handed on to:

- Agriculture Protection Board
- Department of Agriculture
- State Barrier Fence Advisory Committee

=== Energy ===
The PWD began issuing electrical licences in 1925.

These tasks were later handled by:

- State Energy Commission of Western Australia
- Western Power
- Office of Energy
- EnergySafety (A division of the Department of Commerce)

=== Harbours and rivers ===
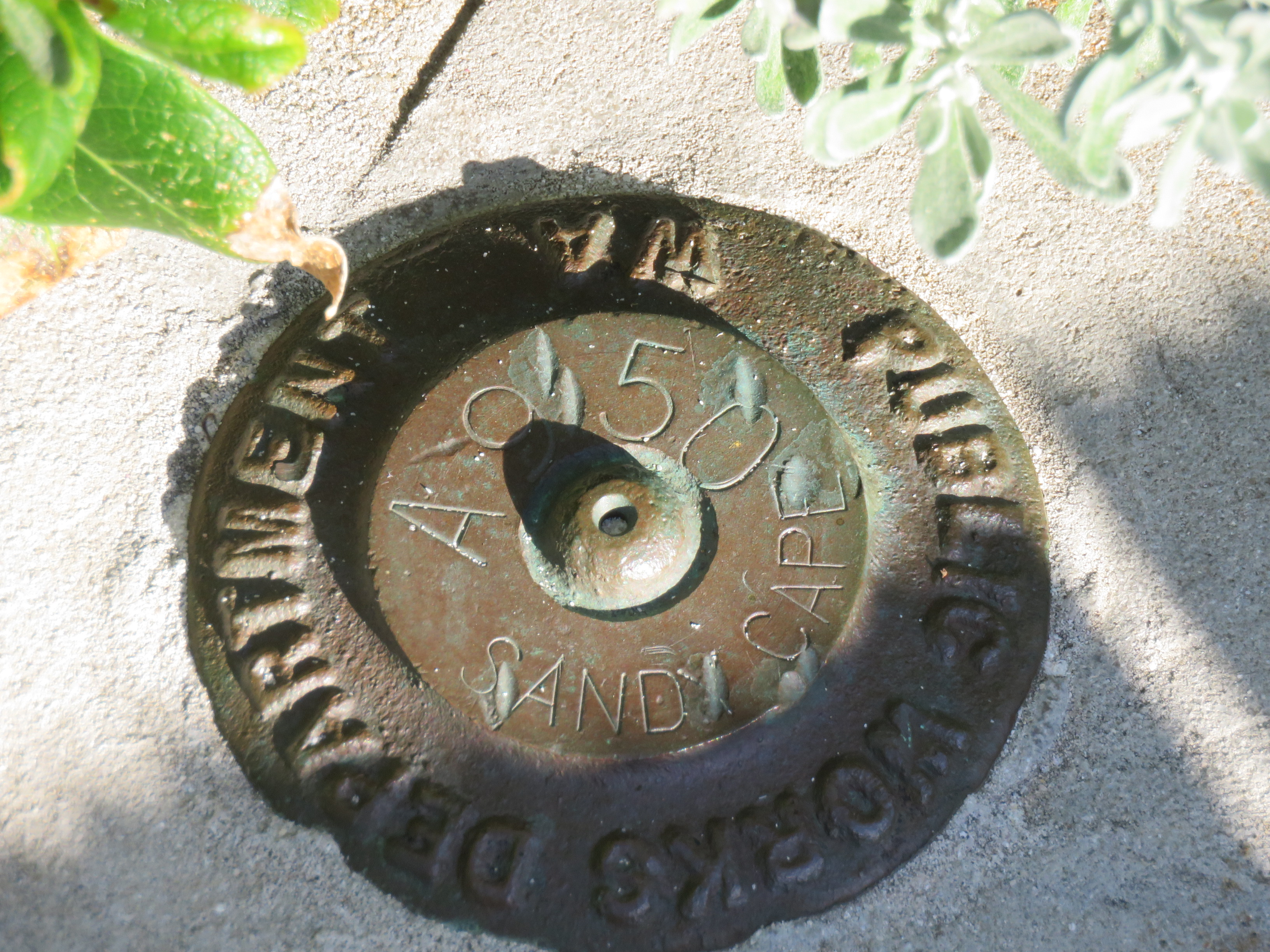
A trig point of the department at Sandy Cape, north of Jurien Bay

The department was responsible for the construction of Fremantle Harbour and many other smaller regional jetties and wharves. Day labour from the department also ran the facilities of the harbours. The department was also responsible for conducting surveys of rivers and coastal features.

During the Great Depression, a number of works were undertaken on the basis of unemployment relief. One of these was the diversion of the Harvey River between 1931 and 1934 and employed over 2500 men.

After the disbanding of the PWD these tasks were taken on by:

- Department of Marine and Harbours
- Department for Planning & Infrastructure
- Swan River Trust
- Department of Conservation and the Environment

=== Mechanical & electrical (M&E) services ===
The department built electrical switchboards for installation on sites around the state. Many of the old PWD switchboards can still be seen at ports and water and sewerage installations. These were generally constructed in the Jewell St workshops. The department was also the forefather of the State Engineering and Implement Works which later became the State Engineering Works with a workshop in North Fremantle.

=== Public buildings ===
The PWD was responsible for the construction of various government buildings such as police stations, schools, hospitals, lighthouses, military buildings, agricultural research stations, courthouses and prisons. This was often undertaken on a contractual basis with design and maintenance also undertaken by the department. Some notable buildings were:

- Claisebrook Abattoir
- Perth GPO
- Council Chambers, Perth
- Government House
- Perth Technical College
- Sunset Hospital

In the wake of the breakup of the PWD, these roles were assumed by:

- Building Management Authority: 1 January 1985 ~ 11 September 1995
- Western Australian Building Management Authority - 11 September 1995 ~ 11 September 1996
- Department of Contract and Management Services - 1 July 1996 ~ 30 June 2001
- Department of Housing & Works - 1 July 2001 ~
- Department of Treasury and Finance - Building Management and Works
- Department of Finance - Building Management and Works

=== Railways ===
See also List of railways constructed by the Public Works Department of Western Australia

The department built and maintained minor railways which serviced regional infrastructure (generally wharves). Other railways were built for specific tasks such as the construction of Mundaring Weir and abandoned upon completion of the required task. Various major railways throughout the state were constructed by the PWD.

Prior to the formation of the PWD railways were managed by:

- Department of Works and Railways: 31 December 1879 ~ 30 September 1890
- Department of Works and Buildings: 1 October 1890 ~ 31 December 1900

Since the PWD these roles have been taken on by:

- Western Australian Government Railways
- Westrail
- Public Transport Authority

=== Roads ===
The PWD was responsible for the construction of roads and bridges around the state. This task was later relegated to:

- Main Roads Board - 1 January 1926 ~ 31 December 1929
- Main Roads Department - 1 January 1930 ~
- Main Roads Western Australia

=== Vehicles and mobile plant ===
The country sections of the PWD maintained a selection of hire cars for visiting government department officers. These along with other PWD transport vehicles and plant such as Malcolm Moore graders, rollers and loaders etc. were maintained by PWD mechanics in PWD workshops.

=== Water and sewerage ===
Public Works Department was responsible for water supplies, drainage, irrigation, sewerage and water resource management for many years after assuming this role from the Water Supply, Sewerage and Drainage Department (1 January 1912 ~ 31 December 1920).

The PWD was responsible for the construction of many dams, reservoirs and conveyancing systems throughout Western Australia. Water and sewerage services in Western Australia were split when the Metropolitan Water Supply, Sewerage and Drainage Board took over responsibility for the metropolitan region while the country areas remained serviced by the PWD until disbandment. The Metropolitan Water supply Sewerage and Drainage Board were based at Loftus Street, Leederville with the head office remaining there, in 1977 the workshops were relocated to Lemnos Street, Shenton Park with Mechanical Fitting,(both on site and workshop based), Machining, Welding, Drawing, Automotive Mechanical, instrument sections, sheetmetal, and separate pipe line maintenance crews. There were also smaller depots, among these were Balcatta and Tinga Place at Kelmscott. Smaller waste water treatment plants were located at Swanbourne and Westfield with plants at Beenyup, Woodmans Point and Lemnos Street, Shenton Park remaining.

There were a large network of pumping stations and treatment plants all over the Metropolitan area which their large workforce maintained. These tasks were later assumed by:

- Water Authority of Western Australia: 1 July 1985 ~ 31 December 1995
- Water Corporation - 1 January 1996 ~
- Department of Water

=== Other ===
- Department of Local Government and Regional Development 1 July 2001 ~ 30 June 2009
- Department of Local Government 1 July 2009 ~
- Department of Regional Development and Lands 1 July 2009 ~
