= York Primary School =

Historic school building in York, Western Australia

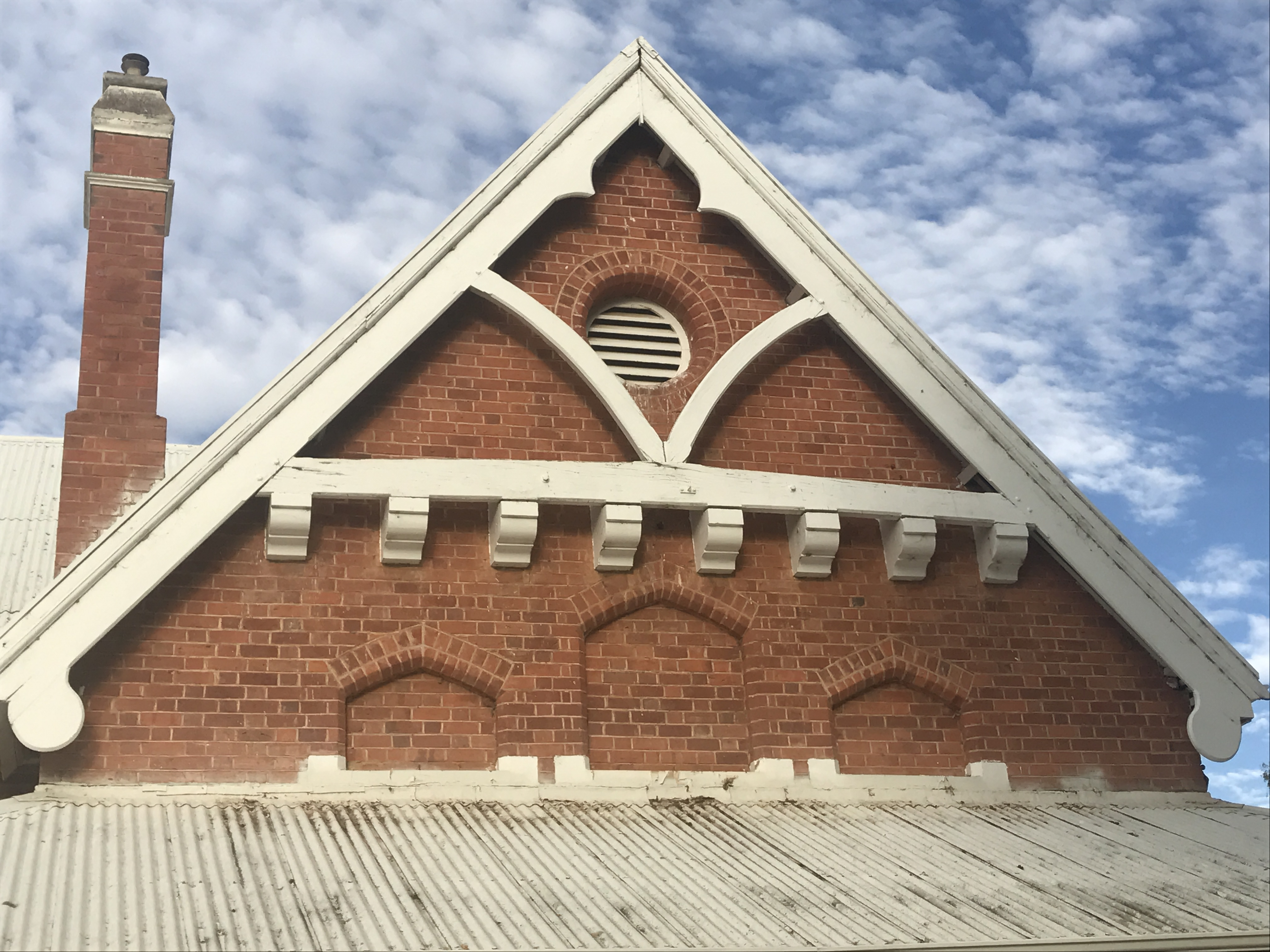
- Gable of the former York Primary School
- Interactive map of the York Primary School area

General information
- Location: Howick St, York, Western Australia
- Coordinates: 31°53′22″S 116°46′00″E
- Opened: June 1896

Western Australia Heritage Register
- Type: State Registered Place
- Designated: 23 November 2001
- Reference no.: 2877

References
- York municipal inventory

The former York Primary School in Howick St was constructed in 1886 as a school for the township of York, Western Australia.

== History ==
Since 1860 there had been a school for girls where the Salvation Army building now stands in Avon Terrace. Behind Settlers House, opposite the building, was the boys' school.

In 1886 as part of a plan to build many schools in the state, this new school was constructed. The architect was George Temple-Poole and the builders were Thorn, Bower & Stewart. The school was built to accommodate both boys and girls. Water was supplied by well in the grounds with the water drawn up by pump, until 1908 when the Goldfields Water Supply Scheme was connected.

Boys and girls had separate entrances and a fence separated their playing grounds. However, this was not without problems as boys crawled through openings in the toilets to tease the girls on the other side.

The old boys school became the infant's school. Because of burgeoning number of students in 1892, girls were relocated to the old girls school in Avon Terrace. Students numbered 170.

In 1989, the school building was extended and three dormer windows added on the east side.

In 1902, because of increased numbers (226 students), infants, were moved to the old girls school. Paul Hasluck attended the school in 1910–1911.

The school experienced problems with fencing, with cows and fowls entering to eat trees and gardens, and children escaping to raid the Catholic presbytery garden next door.

In 1952, the school became a junior high school and in 1959, the senior section moved to new school premises on Trews Road, and in October 1988, the junior high school also moved there and the Howick St school was closed. It is now a medical centre and offices.

== Arts and Crafts building ==
The school is an early example of Federation Arts and Crafts style in Australia.

The designer was Principal Architect George Temple-Poole, who was sympathetic to the Arts and Crafts movement of William Morris and John Ruskin.

The fleche (or arrow like air vent in the centre of the roof) is similar to a fleche in William Morris's own house, Red House, Bexleyheath in the south of London.

“Several of the architectural details bring associations which are faint, yet nonetheless pervasive - the form of the fleche is not unlike a belltower – the carved wooden tracery on the north gable is reminiscent of a Gothic arch – the dentils below bring to mind a classic cornice……these subtle associations are the stuff of which poetry is made and who but an architect of the calibre of G T Poole, with his rich store of cultural experience from the Old World could embellish his buildings with such charmingly evocative details?”.

The school has other Arts and Crafts features:

- Gable with barge-board
- Conspicuous high pitched roof
- Tall chimneys
- Prominent eaves
- Gabled entrance with parapet
