= General Post Office, Perth =

Heritage building in Perth, Western Australia

General Post Office Perth
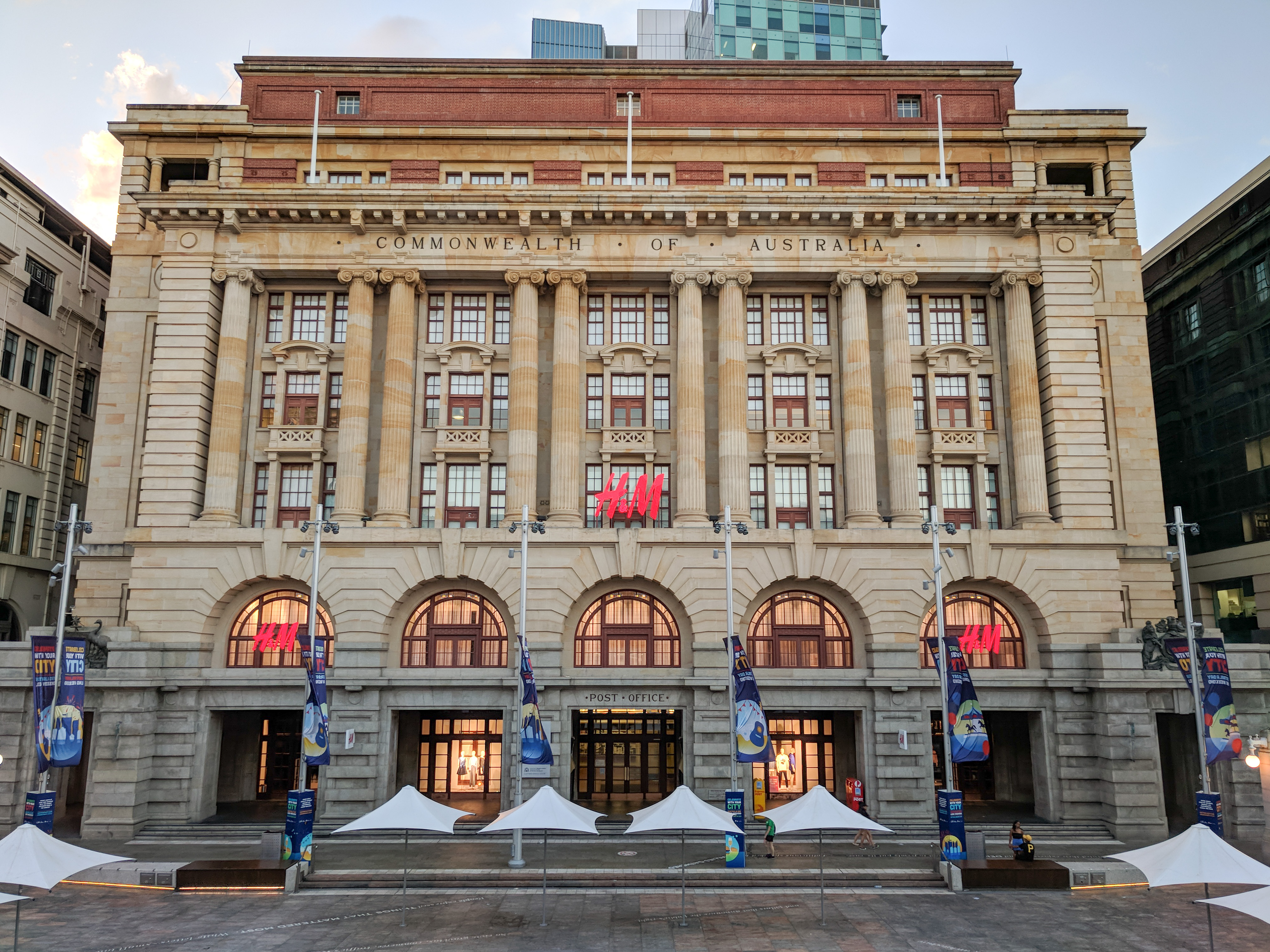
- General Post Office building, Perth in January 2018
- Interactive map of the General Post Office; Perth area

General information
- Status: Completed
- Type: Post office
- Architectural style: Beaux-Arts
- Location: Western Australia, 3 Forrest Place, Perth, Australia
- Coordinates: 31.9522°S 115.8590°E
- Current tenants: H&M; Metropolitan Redevelopment Authority
- Construction started: 1914
- Completed: 1923
- Owner: Australia Post

Technical details
- Material: Donnybrook stone; Granite

Design and construction
- Architects: John Smith Murdoch; Hillson Beasley
- Designations: Commonwealth Heritage List; State Register of Heritage Places

Commonwealth Heritage List
- Official name: Perth General Post Office
- Type: Listed place (Historic)
- Designated: 22 June 2004
- Reference no.: 105527

Western Australia Heritage Register
- Type: State Registered Place
- Designated: 16 October 1992
- Reference no.: 1979

The General Post Office is a heritage landmark building in Perth, Western Australia. Located on the western side of Forrest Place in the city's central business district, its imposing stone facade is in the Beaux-Arts style. The building was completed in 1923 after almost a decade of construction, which was protracted by World War I and the resulting shortages of construction materials. At the time of its opening, it was the largest building in Perth.

After decades serving as Perth's central post office, Australia Post vacated the building on 22 July 2016. A franchise of clothing retailer H&M opened in its place in March 2017.

== History ==
=== Previous postal services ===
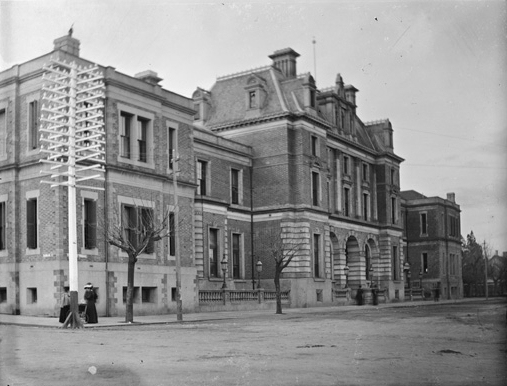
The Old Treasury Building at the corner of St Georges Terrace and Barrack Street, the previous home of the Perth General Post Office

In the first year of the colony, the harbourmaster was appointed to perform the postal services for the colony. A General Post Office was proclaimed in St Georges Terrace in 1835, and in 1841 a Postmaster General was appointed. The colonial Posts and Telegraph Department took over control of Perth's telegraph services in 1871, and telephone services in 1889. The Perth General Post Office was relocated to St Georges Terrace between 1887 and 1890, however by 1910 this accommodation was inadequate for the services provided. In 1900 there were 175 post offices across Western Australia, together with 160 telephone exchanges. The Federal Government took over control of postal and telecommunication services at Federation in 1901.

=== Construction ===
On 28 November 1911, the Federal Government bought 1.2 hectares (3 acres) of land across Wellington Street from the Perth railway station. This land stretched to Murray Street and featured an "unhealthy" shopping arcade named Central Arcade. The land was to be used as a Federal Government precinct, allowing the Commonwealth departments to move out of the cramped Treasury Buildings at the corner of St Georges Terrace and Barrack Street, which it shared with the State Government. A proposal was made in 1912 for a 20-metre-wide (66 ft) street through the site featuring a new General Post Office building.

Principal Architect Hillson Beasley visited Melbourne, where he worked with Commonwealth Architect John Smith Murdoch to design the new General Post Office building. Architectural plans were drawn up and the construction contract with C. W. Arnott signed on 7 July 1914 at a cost of £A 232,700, equivalent to A$30.9 million in 2022. These original plans provided for five storeys above ground level, in addition to a basement.

Construction commenced in mid-1914, and initially experienced a delay due to sandy soil on the site. The foundation stone was laid by Minister for Home Affairs William Archibald on 8 October 1915. The subsequent outbreak of World War I led to a significant delay in the building's construction. The steel to be used in the construction became subject to an embargo by the British Government in 1916. An alternative supply was finally sourced from BHP in 1920. Construction was later delayed due to a six-month engineers' strike. The flooring and fittings were originally to be Australian blackwood, however Murdoch substituted jarrah which could be locally sourced.

William Hardwick succeeded Beasley as the Principal Architect in 1917 and oversaw the project from that point until its completion. Although the end date given in the construction contract was October 1917, the building was not nearing completion and this term in the contract was waived. Over the course of construction, the design of the building had been modified several times, largely in an effort to reduce costs. In 1921 it was resolved to add a further two storeys to the top of the building for use by other Commonwealth departments. These additional storeys were to be walled with brickwork, rather than the stone used to clad the rest of the building's facade. However, the side and rear walls of the building were also of brick, and so the brick attic storey "tied in" with these treatments.

The General Post Office was officially opened on 26 September 1923 after around nine years of protracted construction, at a total cost of £A 400,000, equivalent to A$36.4 million in 2022.

The new street in front of the building was ceremonially opened on the same day and was named Forrest Place in honour of John Forrest, Western Australia's first Premier. At its opening, the new General Post Office was Perth's largest building, and it has been said that its imposing design proclaimed "the might of the new Commonwealth".

Federal legislators now in Perth agree that the new G.P.O. rivals the Commonwealth Bank, of Sydney, as the most sumptuous and impressive Federal building in Australia.

— The West Australian, 26 September 1923, p. 10

=== Subsequent history ===
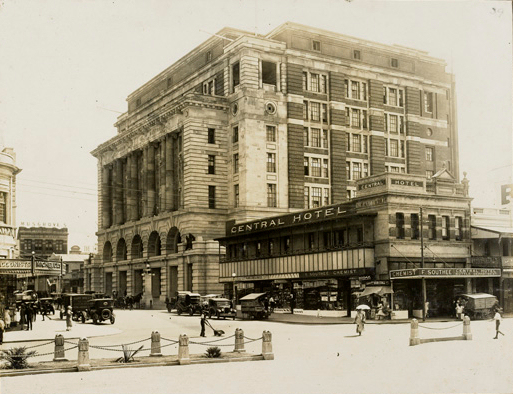
The General Post Office around 1929, viewed from the Perth railway station

The Commonwealth precinct expanded with subsequent construction of the Commonwealth Bank building immediately south of the General Post Office. It was officially opened on 22 March 1933 by Robert Gibson. It was designed in a similar style to the General Post Office by the architectural staff of the bank, and built by A. Douglas for a tender price of £A 207,000. The building featured cornice lines and columns of the same style as the General Post Office. Another similarly styled Commonwealth department was planned for the General Post Office's northern side; this was not constructed for many decades, and did not emulate the design of the General Post Office.

Forrest Place was closed to traffic in the late 1980s as part of the Forrest Chase development. The Padbury Buildings on the eastern side of Forrest Place, which had been constructed in 1925, were demolished, and the newly created pedestrian mall featured basement parking and loading docks for the General Post Office. The widening of Forrest Place has effectively created a town square dominated by the General Post Office building.

On 22 June 1992, the General Post Office was recognised for its heritage value by interim listing on the Western Australian Register of Heritage Places; it received a permanent entry on the Register on 16 October 1992.

Perth GPO is a fine example of monumental civic architecture. It is of architectural significance as a rare example in Australia of a large building in the Beaux-Arts style.

— Western Australian Register of Heritage Places – Statement of Significance

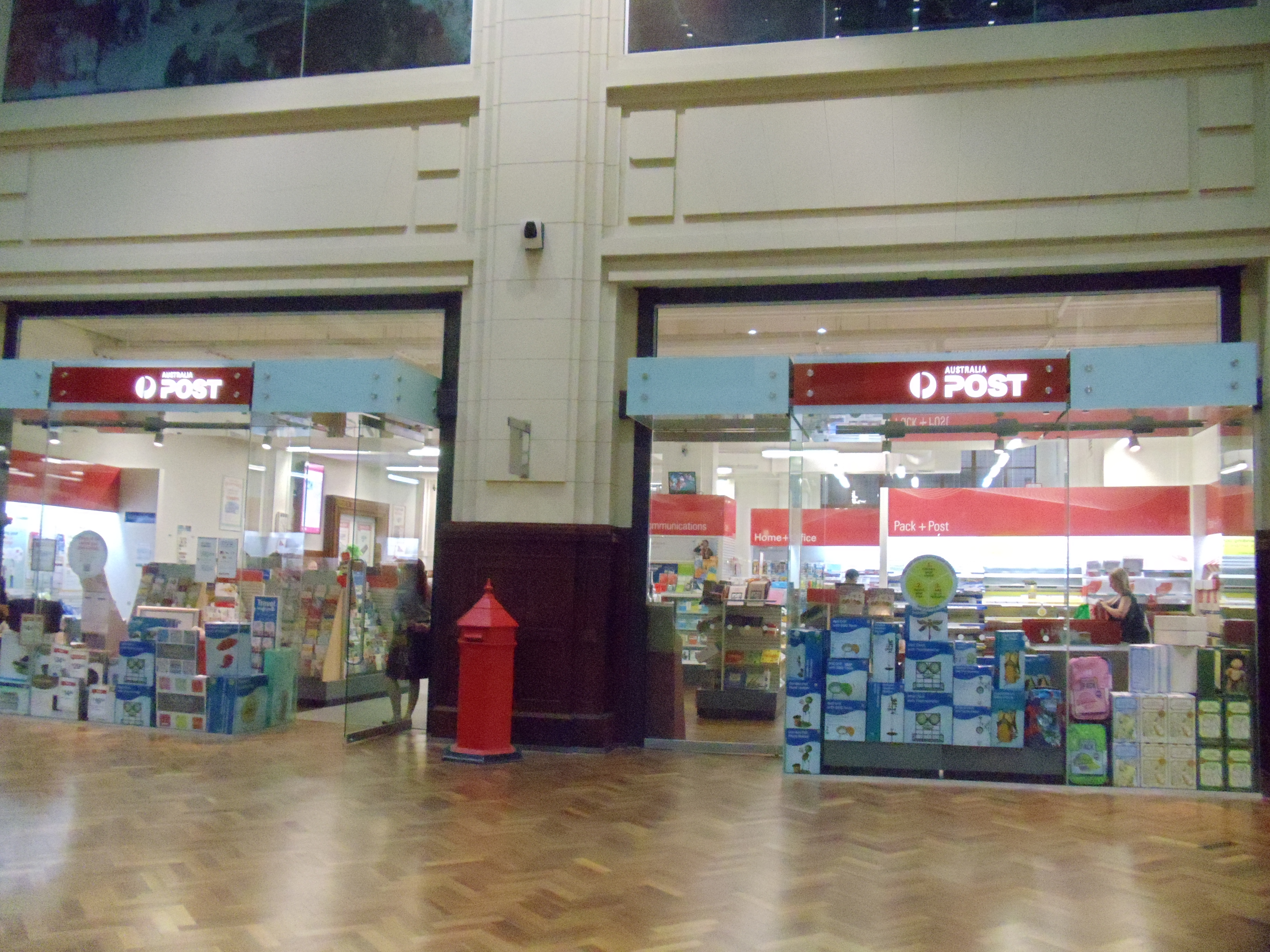
The Australia Post shop inside the General Post Office prior to its closure in 2016

After decades serving as Perth's central post office, Australia Post vacated the building on 22 July 2016. A franchise of clothing retailer H&M opened in its place in March 2017. Australia Post later reopened its central post office at Perth railway station before moving to its new permanent location on St Georges Terrace.

== Design ==
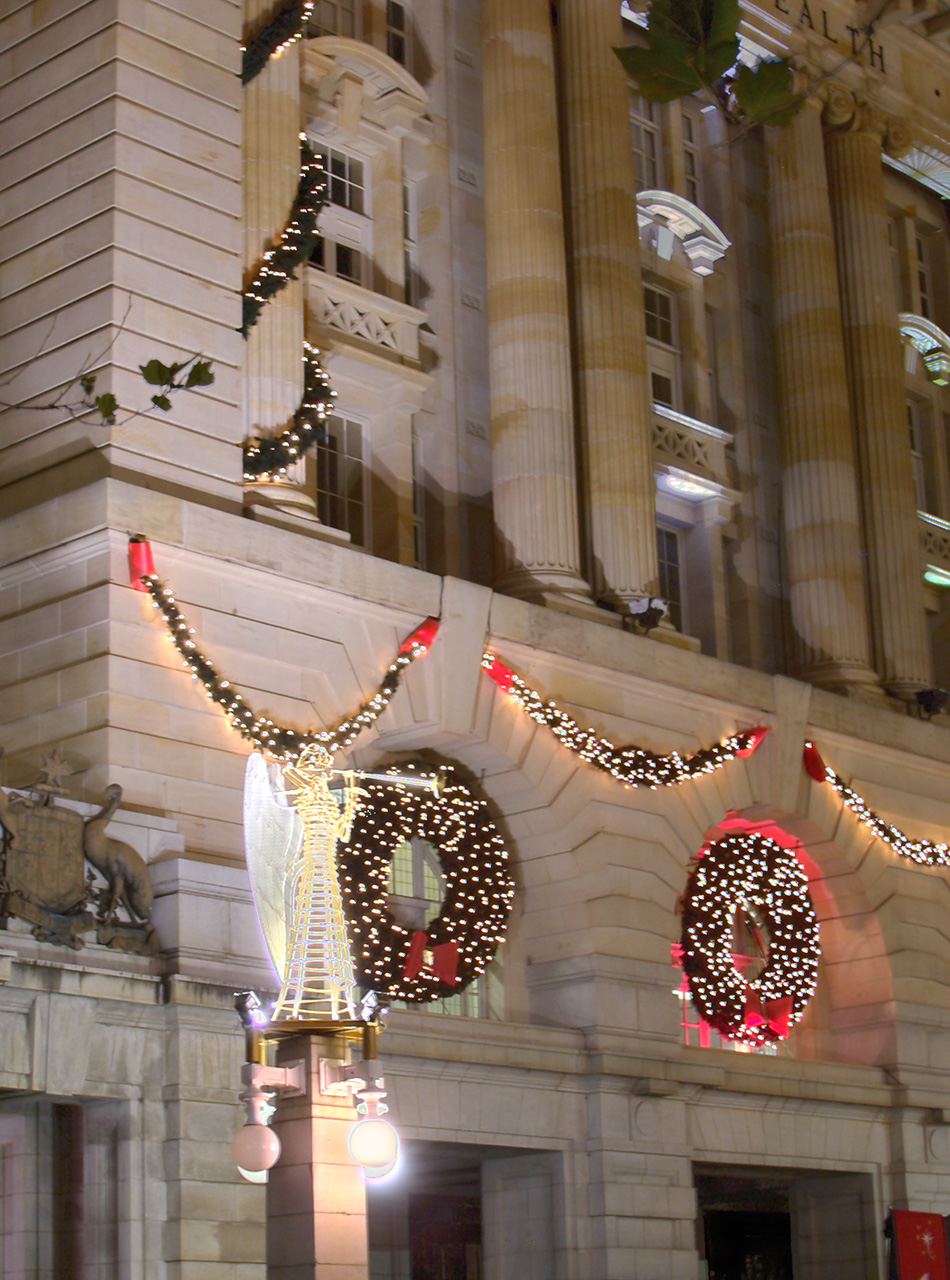
The General Post Office decorated for Christmas

The architecture of the General Post Office building has been referred to as High Edwardian Classical and a "free treatment of the Greek Renaissance". It features a neo-classical facade, featuring Donnybrook stone (a sandstone), including large paired Ionic columns, rising above an arcade lined with Mahogany Creek Granite facing. At the time of its opening, the building was considered to be "by far the most ornate structure in the city".

We have no building of the same class as this with which we can make comparison; even the quality of the brickwork is superior to any other brickwork in Western Australia ... this building will be in an extraordinary degree be made up of local materials. The granite is the finest I have ever seen.

— John Smith Murdoch, at the 1921 Parliamentary Standing Committee enquiry

The interior of the General Post Office was similarly well-finished, with jarrah features throughout. An estimated 600,000 jarrah blocks were used in the herringbone-pattern flooring. The ground floor is fronted by a large colonnade along its entire width. The main postal hall was two storeys high, with balconies from the first floor above. The postal hall also featured a frosted glass roof, above which a lightwell reached to the top of the building.

The basement of the General Post Office accommodated vaults and was also used for the handling of bulk parcels. The first floor served as the Mail Room, while the second floor housed executive offices. The third floor housed the State Engineer in addition to the managers and operators of the telephone and telegraph systems. The telegraph operating room was connected to the ground floor by pneumatic tubes. The fourth and fifth floors of the building were originally home to the Taxation Department, and the sixth floor was home to miscellaneous other Federal departments, as well as providing accommodation for Federal Members of Parliament. On the seventh floor was a staff dining room and rest areas.

The General Post Office is founded on 1,525 piles in groups of 25, each pile 9.1 metres (30 ft) long and 36 centimetres (14 in) in diameter. The building featured four passenger lifts and two goods lifts. The building is constructed by a concrete-encased steel frame, faced with stone and brick. The brick walls did not receive a particularly favourable reception upon the building's opening:

As for the brick sides and rear of the G.P.O., they might be mistaken for the walls of a factory by anyone who had not seen the front and read, above the Ionic columns, the words "Commonwealth of Australia."

— The West Australian, 26 September 1923, p. 10

== Sources ==
- Barry, Hannah (2 March 2017). "Fashion frenzy: Perth H&M store opening draws thousands to the city". WAtoday.
- H.E. the Governor General (26 September 1923). Souvenir to commemorate the opening of the new General Post Office, Perth, WA. Ephemera. Postmaster General's Department. Battye Library.
- H.E. the Governor General (1923). Invitation card to official opening of the new General Post Office, Perth, WA. Ephemera. Postmaster General's Department. Battye Library.
- Heritage Council. "Padbury Buildings". Places Database. Heritage Council of Western Australia. Archived from the original on 30 September 2007.
- Heritage Council. "Permanent Entry – General Post Office" (PDF). Western Australian Register of Heritage Places. Heritage Council of WA. Archived from the original (PDF) on 26 June 2009.
- Kelly, Joel (23 July 2016). "Perth GPO closure: Post office building in Forrest Chase makes way for fashion retail giant H&M". PerthNow.
- London, Geoffrey (2002). A Short History of Perth Architecture. Balmain: Pesaro Publishing. ISBN 1-877015-01-6.
- Molyneux, Ian, ed. (1981). Looking around Perth: a guide to the architecture of Perth and surrounding towns. Compiled for the Royal Australian Institute of Architects (W.A. Chapter). East Fremantle: Wescolour Press. OCLC 85994799.
- The West Australian (26 September 1923). "Postal Palace: the new GPO ready at last at cost of £400,000". The West Australian. p. 10. Archived from the original on 31 July 2008.
- Ward (November 1991). Perth General Post Office: conservation analysis and conservation management plan. Andrew C. Ward & Associates.
