= Northam Senior High School =

High school in the Wheatbelt region of Western Australia

Location
- Northam, Wheatbelt region, Western Australia; Australia; 31°38′53″S 116°40′03″E

Information
- Type: Public co-educational high school
- Motto: Achievement
- Established: 1921; 105 years ago
- Educational authority: WA Department of Education
- Principal: Jodee Vause
- Years: 7–12
- Enrolment: 715 (2020)
- Colours: Green, red and yellow
- Website: northamshs.wa.edu.au

Western Australia Heritage Register
- Official name: Northam Senior High School
- Type: State Registered Place
- Designated: 18 December 2007
- Reference no.: 1883

Northam Senior High School is a comprehensive public co-educational high school, located in Northam, a regional centre in the Wheatbelt region, 97 kilometres (60 mi) east of Perth, Western Australia.

== History ==
The school was established in 1921 and by 2020 had an enrolment of 715 students between Year 7 and Year 12, approximately 12% of whom were Indigenous Australians.

It is the oldest senior high school outside the Perth metropolitan area.

Many of the buildings are heritage listed having been built in 1921, 1930 and 1945. The main school building, designed by the Principal Architect of Western Australia, William Hardwick, and the later additions that followed the original design are considered good examples of the inter-war arts and crafts style.

Enrolments at the school have been reasonably steady with 645 students enrolled in 2007, 663 in 2008, 629 in 2009, 559 in 2010, 608 in 2011 and 604 in 2012.

== Notable alumni ==
- Harry Butler (1930–2015), naturalist and environmental consultant
- John Colebatch (1909–2005), pioneering cancer researcher
- Jerry Ellis, Rhodes Scholar, chairman of BHP, chancellor of Monash University
- Bobby Hill, played for Collingwood and GWS in the Australian Football League
- Barbara York Main (1929–2019), arachnologist, adjunct professor at the University of Western Australia
- Kenneth Martin, a justice of the Supreme Court of Western Australia
- Nonja Peters, academic
- John Rutherford, Australian Test cricketer
- Sydney Stack, AFL player
- Shirley Strickland (1925–2004), a world record-holding Olympic athlete
- Jay Watson, musician, singer and songwriter, with Tame Impala and Pond
- John Yocklunn, national librarian for Papua New Guinesa

== See also ==
- List of schools in rural Western Australia
