= Toodyay Post Office =

Post office building in Toodyay, Western Australia

The Old Toodyay Post Office
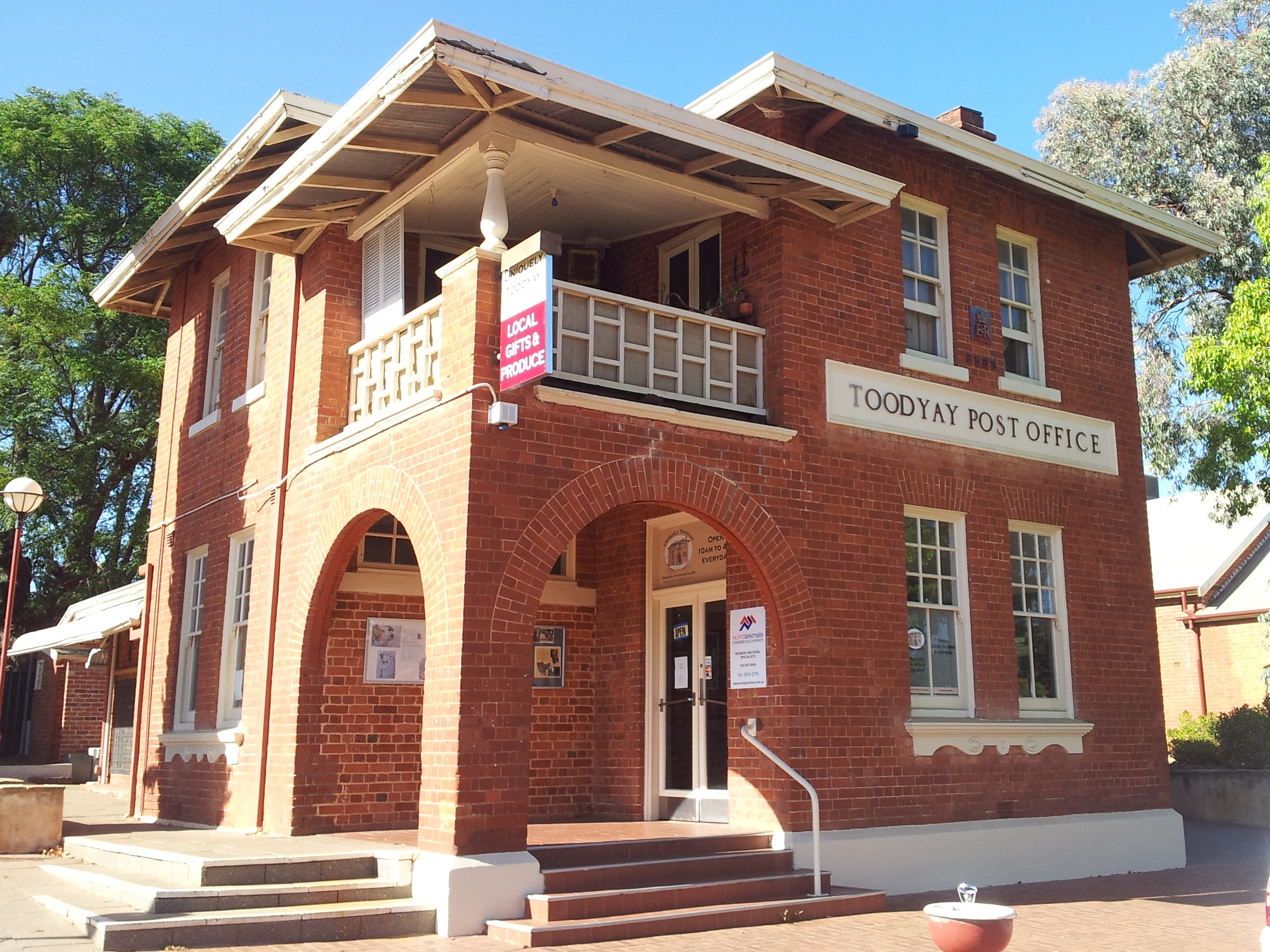
- Toodyay Post Office
- Interactive map of the The Old Toodyay Post Office area
- Former names: Newcastle Post & Telegraph Office

General information
- Location: 115 Stirling Terrace, Toodyay, Australia
- Coordinates: 31.5502°S 116.4669°E
- Construction started: May 1897
- Completed: 1897
- Renovated: 1970

Design and construction
- Architect: George Temple-Poole
- Main contractor: Herbert Parker

Western Australia Heritage Register
- Type: State Registered Place
- Designated: 11 August 1995
- Reference no.: 2576

References
- Toodyay municipal inventory

The Toodyay Post Office and residence is located in Toodyay, Western Australia on the corner of Stirling Terrace and Duke Street North.

It was designed by colonial architect George Temple-Poole and was part of a scheme by the Public Works Department. Over 100 post offices were built to a standard design during the late 1890s; the Toodyay Post Office is one of the few remaining examples.

Postal services began in Toodyay in 1842.

Victory Day decorations at Toodyay Post Office, 1945

The telephone was connected in 1907, and by 1949 the Toodyay (telephone) Exchange serviced about 120 local connections. At this time the staff comprised three postal assistants and four telephonists. Nine mails were despatched weekly to Perth and ten were received via a taxi service ("Miss Toodyay" operating out of the Toodyay Garage) or by rail.

Some weather measurements were taken at the post office in Toodyay in the 1940s.

It was added to the State Heritage Register in 1995, with the listing noting that the building was "a fine example of both turn-of-the-century Public Works architecture and civic architecture of George Temple-Poole".

As at 2019, the building is no longer used for postal services which are provided from a new location on Piesse Street.

Since 2011, Uniquely Toodyay, a Co-operative store- run by locals who make/grow/produce and then sell there products, have called it home.
