= Fremantle Post Office =

Post office in Fremantle, Western Australia

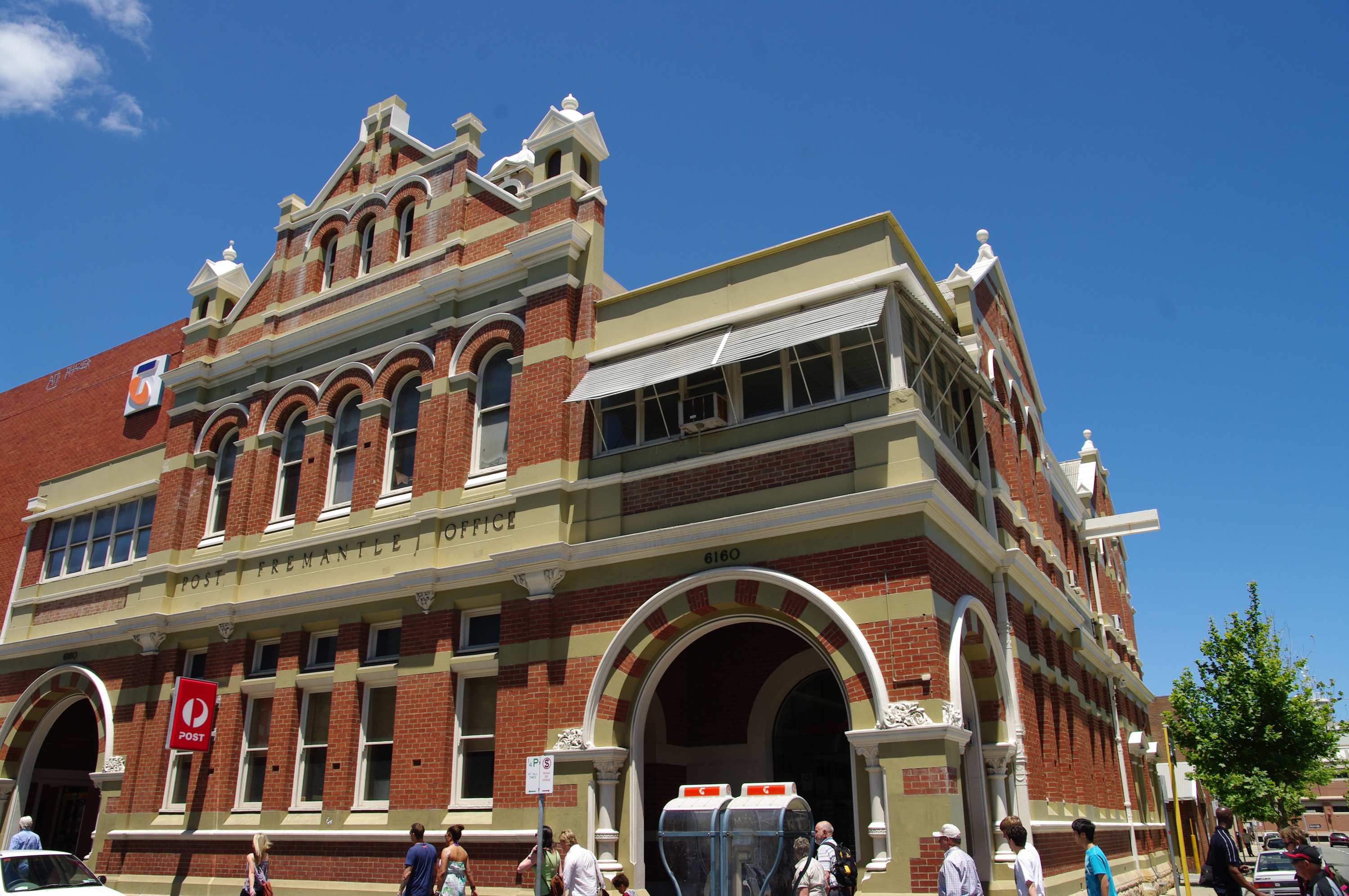
- Fremantle Post Office
- Interactive map of the Fremantle Post Office area

General information
- Type: Historic building
- Location: Fremantle, Western Australia
- Coordinates: 32.0533°S 115.7458°E

Western Australia Heritage Register
- Type: State Registered Place
- Designated: 6 February 1996
- Reference no.: 951

The Fremantle Post Office located in Market Street, Fremantle was designed by Hillson Beasley of the Public Works Department, planned in 1906 and opened in 1907. It was renovated during the Western Australian Centenary year of 1929, and again in 1987 for the America's Cup challenge. Following a rain storm in August 2022, the ceiling collapsed, and the Post Office operations have been temporarily moved to other locations in Fremantle. Currently, the post office is operating from 22 Queen Street, Fremantle.

A site on the other (east) side of Market Street, and further south, was also considered in 1905 as a location for the new post office. The shops along Market Street and bordered by Cantonment Street and High Street were to be resumed, and a new building built; this never eventuated.

The building is listed on the Register of the National Estate.
