= Newcastle Police Stables =

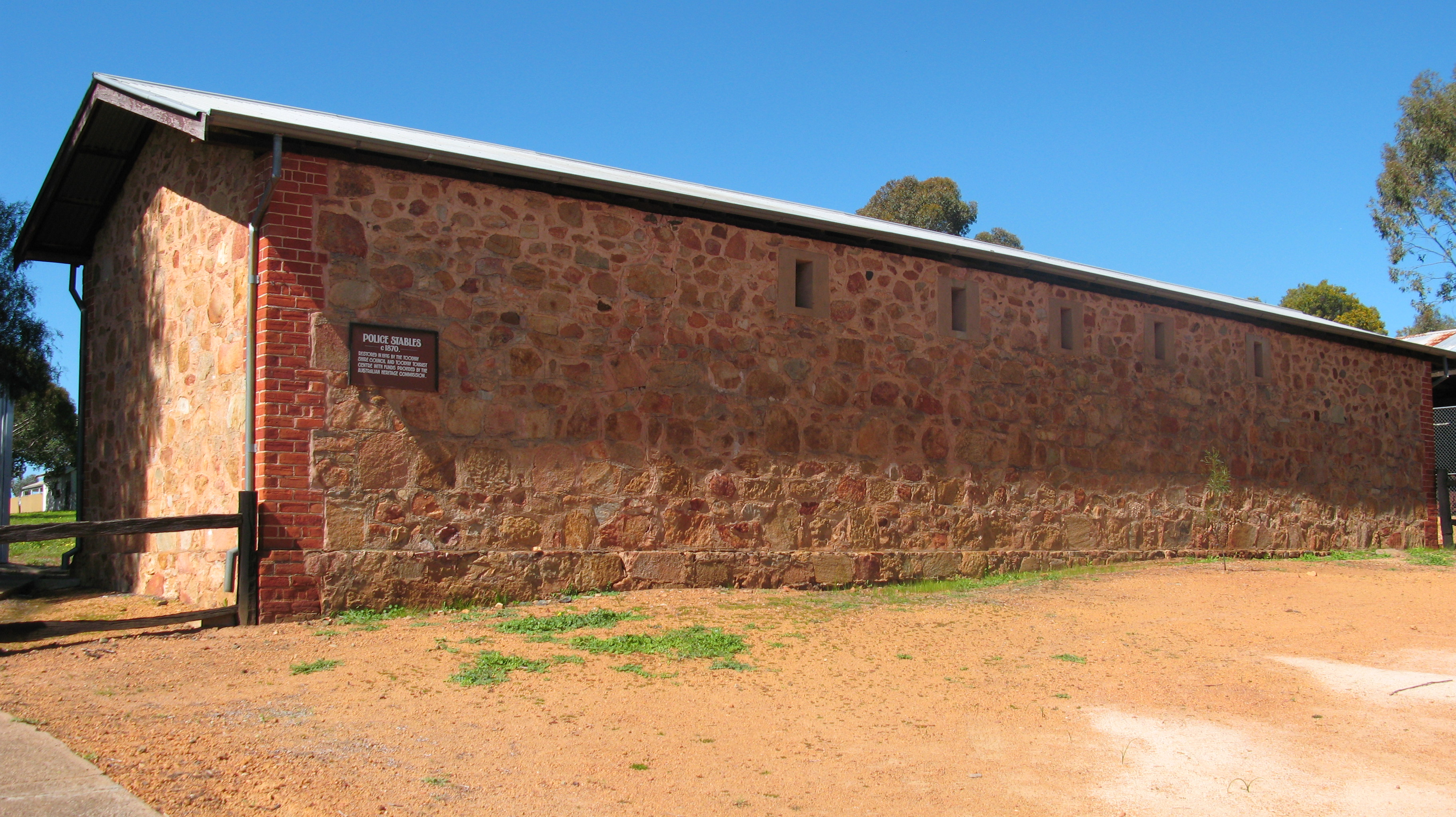
- The stables
- Interactive map of the Newcastle Police Stables area
- Alternative names: Toodyay Police Stables

General information
- Architectural style: Victorian vernacular
- Location: 15-17 Clinton Street, Toodyay
- Coordinates: 31.5536°S 116.4677°E
- Completed: 1891; 135 years ago
- Renovated: 1970s

Design and construction
- Main contractor: James Hasell

Western Australia Heritage Register
- Official name: Newcastle Gaol, Lock-up and Stables Group, Toodyay
- Type: State Registered Place
- Designated: 31 May 1996
- Reference no.: 2558

References
- Toodyay municipal inventory

The Newcastle Police Stables on Clinton Street in Toodyay, Western Australia were constructed in 1891 and replaced the original timber stables erected on this site in 1860, which were destroyed by fire.

In 1970 the stables were classified by the National Trust and included on the permanent Register of the National Estate in 1978 as part of the Newcastle Gaol, Lock-up and Stables Group. The stables along with the 1907 police lock-up were listed separately from the gaol complex on the municipal inventory to enable nomination to the National Trust classified list.

== History ==
Timber stables were built on the site using convict labour in the 1860s. A fire that started in a dung heap destroyed those timber stables in 1890. The stables were replaced with a brick and stone structure designed by George Temple-Poole and built by James Hasell in 1891.

The present building is a single storey stone range with brick quoining and stone window dressings. It has a shallow pitched corrugated iron roof with gables. The façade facing the street is solid stonework with five small high level openings. The entrance to the building is at the rear.

The stables remained in use until 1955. Restoration of the building began in the 1970s and the stables are currently open as part of the Newcastle Old Gaol Museum complex.

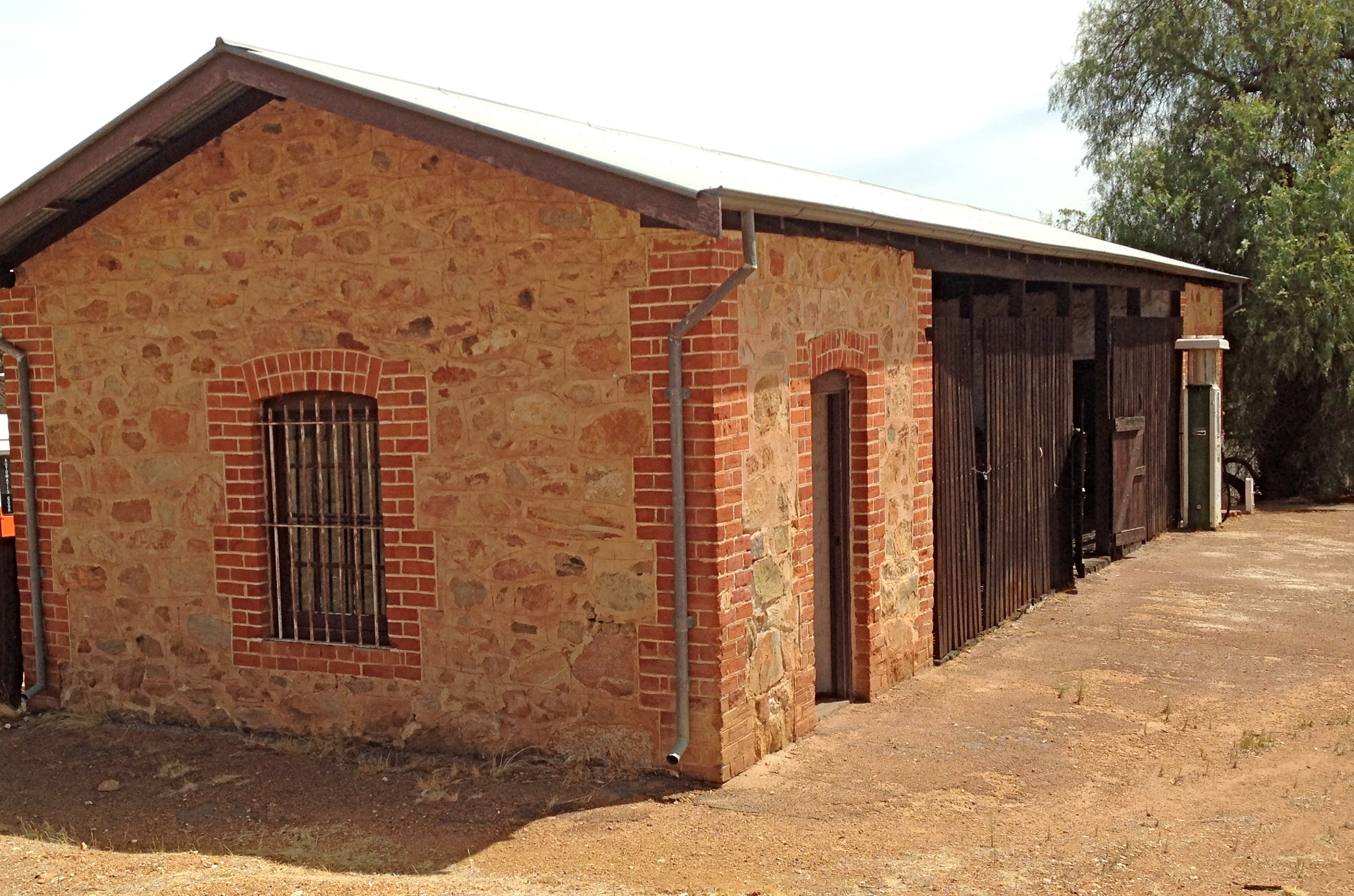
Police Stables from rear
