= Albany Cottage Hospital =

Heritage building in Albany, Western Australia

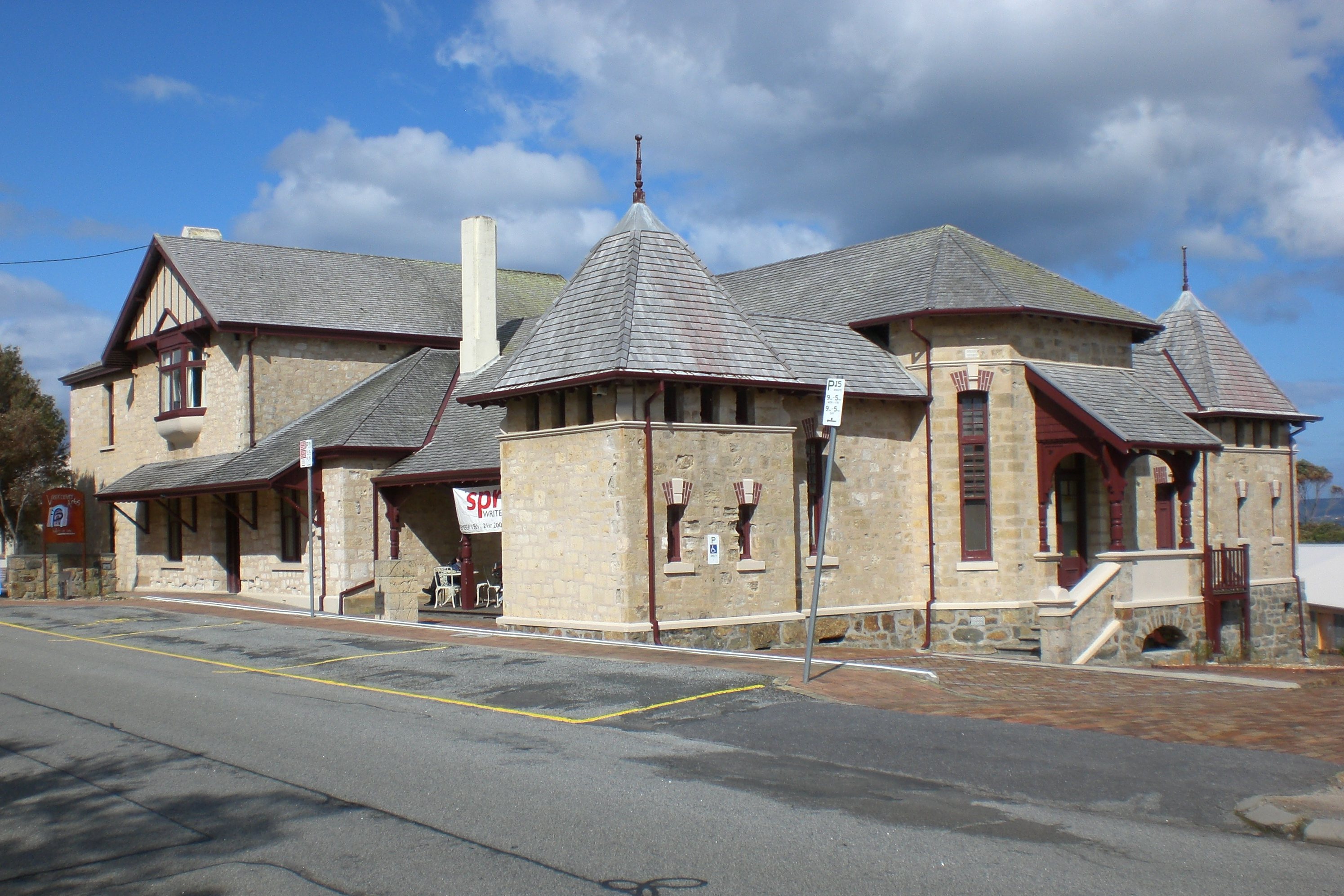
- Albany Cottage Hospital, 2008
- Interactive map of the Albany Cottage Hospital area

General information
- Type: Homestead
- Location: Albany, Western Australia
- Coordinates: 35°01′35″S 117°52′29″E

Western Australia Heritage Register
- Designated: 22 November 2002
- Reference no.: 69

Albany Cottage Hospital is the heritage site of a former hospital in Albany, Western Australia. The site is also named the Vancouver Arts Centre Group for its later use as a community arts centre.

== Description ==
The buildings and grounds are situated on Vancouver Street, Albany, on a site that overlooks the Princess Royal Harbour. The main building is constructed from local limestone, with a roof of split she-oak Casuarina sp? shingles. The hospital was completed in 1897, from the 1886 design of George Temple-Poole, and continued to operate until 1962.

== Heritage value ==
This work by Poole was the first of his many public buildings in the state, and a significant departure in architectural style for the Public Works Department. The design followed a contemporary movement of architects, such as Edwin Lutyens, that drew influence from the English cottage. The work is identified as Federation Arts and Crafts, and as an "aesthetically exceptional example" of the architect's work. Other nineteenth century buildings on the site, such as the former nurses quarters, morgue, and carpenters workshop, are regarded as significant as an intact hospital complex, and in particular as a cottage hospital. It is the oldest remaining hospital of the historic township. The views of the harbour make this a significant landmark.

The building was established as an arts centre and various conservation works were done in the early 2000s.

== See also ==
List of places on the State Register of Heritage Places in the City of Albany
