= Government House, Perth =

Government House
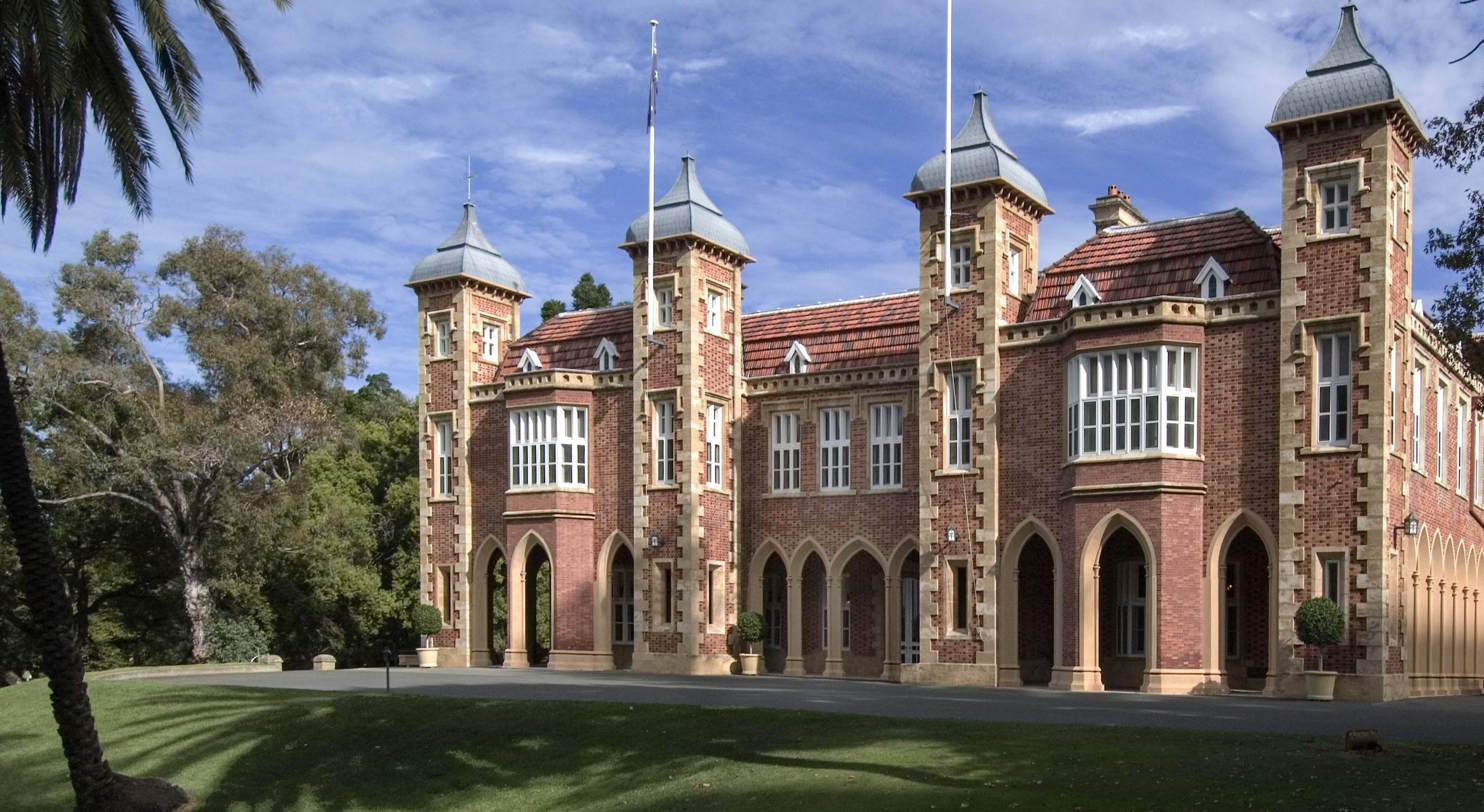

General information
- Type: Government office
- Location: Perth, Western Australia
- Coordinates: 31.957035°S 115.861443°E

Western Australia Heritage Register
- Type: State Registered Place
- Designated: 19 April 2011
- Reference no.: 2095

Government House is the official residence of the governor of Western Australia, and is situated in the central business district in Perth, Western Australia. It was built in the Jacobean Revival style between 1859 and 1864.

The building is located on the southern side of St Georges Terrace, on the same block as Council House and the Supreme Court buildings. The site has been used by governors since the establishment of the Swan River Colony in 1829; the current building is the third to have served that purpose on the site. The buildings and gardens of Government House are of exceptional heritage significance, being listed on the Western Australian Register of Heritage Places and classified by the National Trust. They are regularly opened for public viewing.

== Description ==
The building is a two-storey mansion designed by Edmund Henderson in the early Stuart or Jacobean Revival style, set on 3.2 hectares (7.9 acres) of English gardens in the centre of the Perth business district, between St George's Terrace and the Swan River. The unique architectural character of the building is characterised by the use of stonework and bonded brickwork, incorporating square mullioned windows, decorated gables and ogival capped turrets. The attenuated gothic arcading at ground floor level derives from another form of Victorian Revival expression Fonthill Gothic. The building has 16 rooms on the ground floor and 25 on the first floor. According to the Western Australian Register of Heritage Places Assessment, Government House is a "unique example of a Victorian Gentleman's residence" set in landscaped gardens with mature plantings and a number of commemorative trees.

Images of Government House
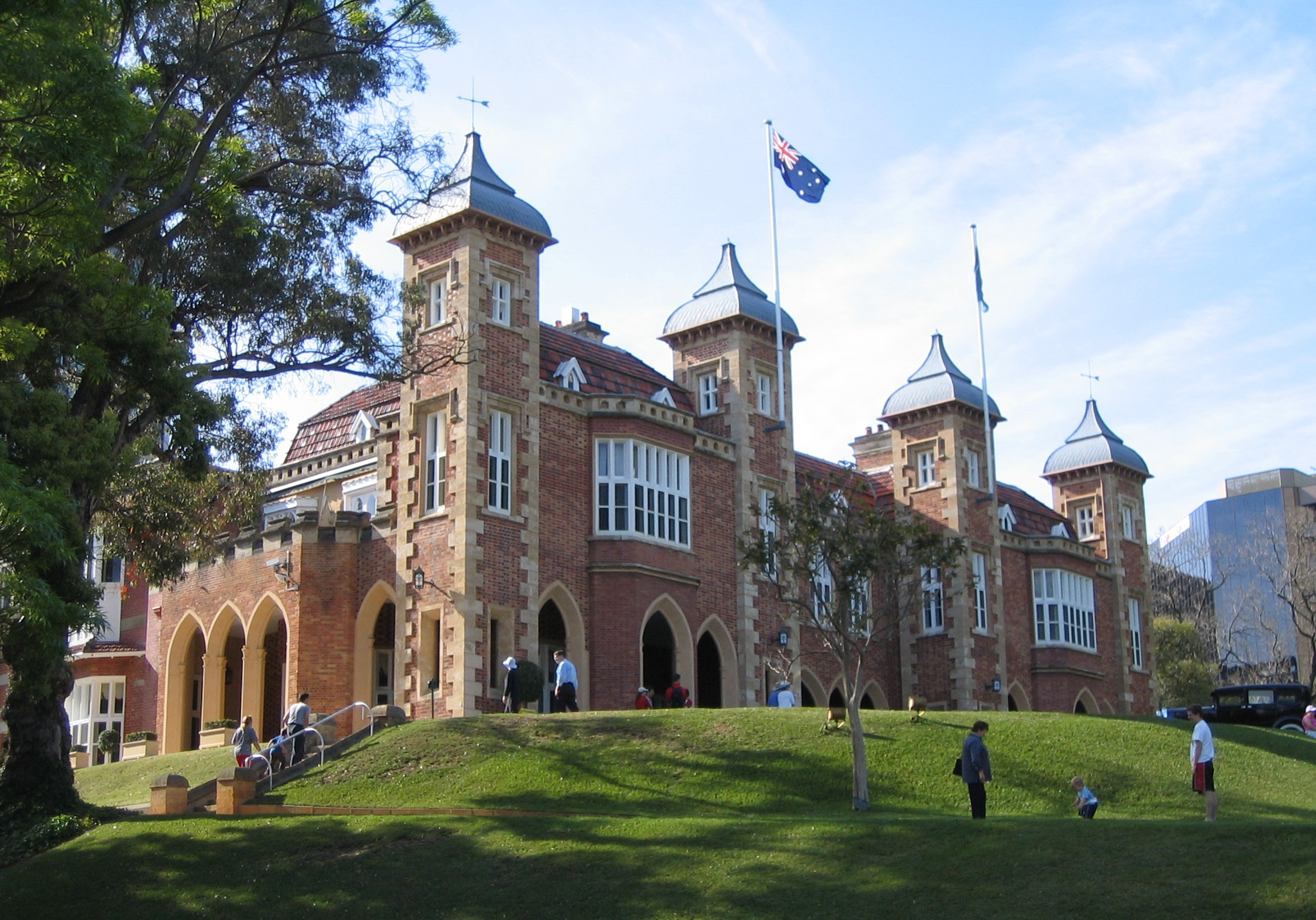
Government House, the residence of the Governor of Western Australia

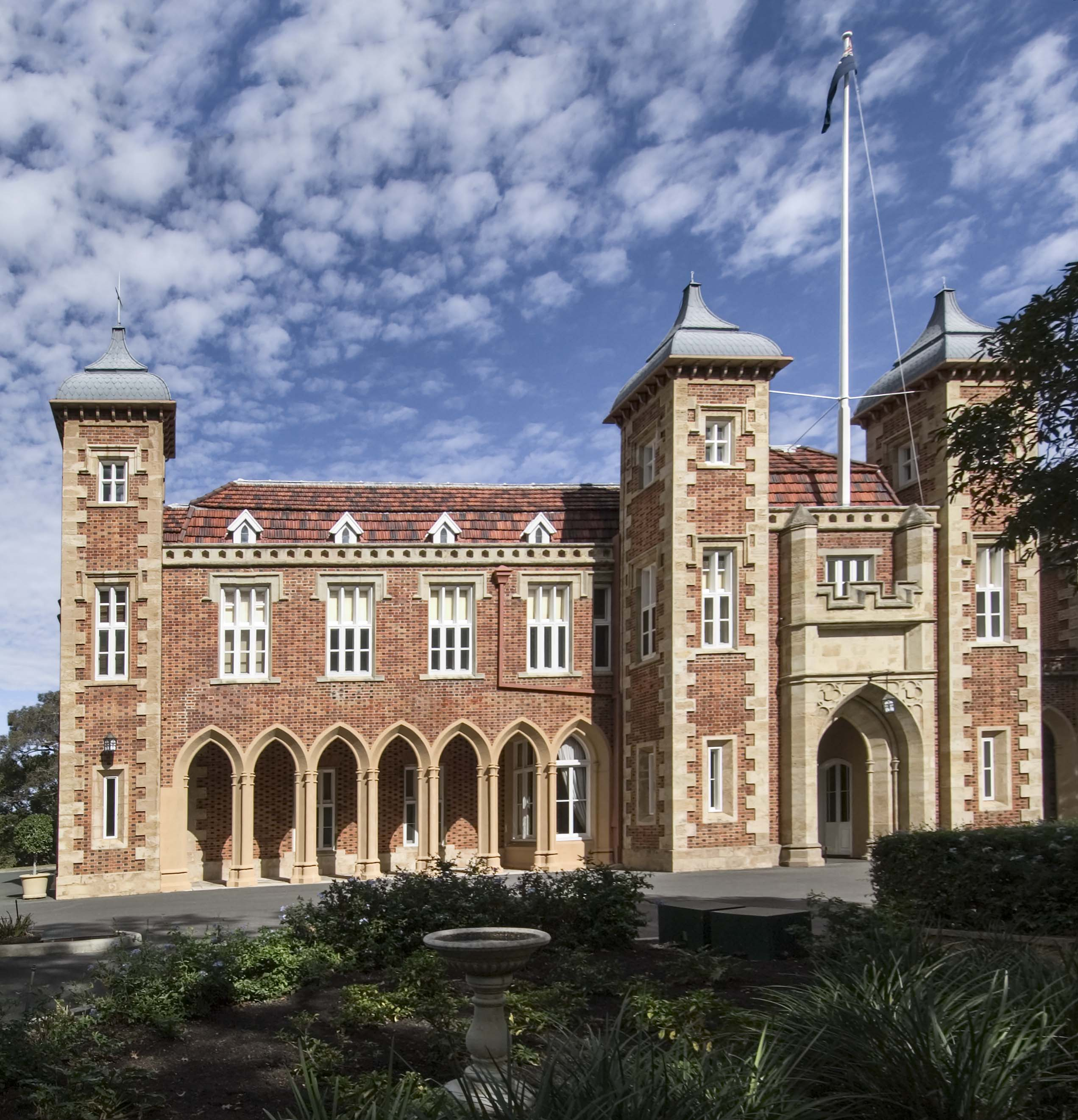
Government House, north front

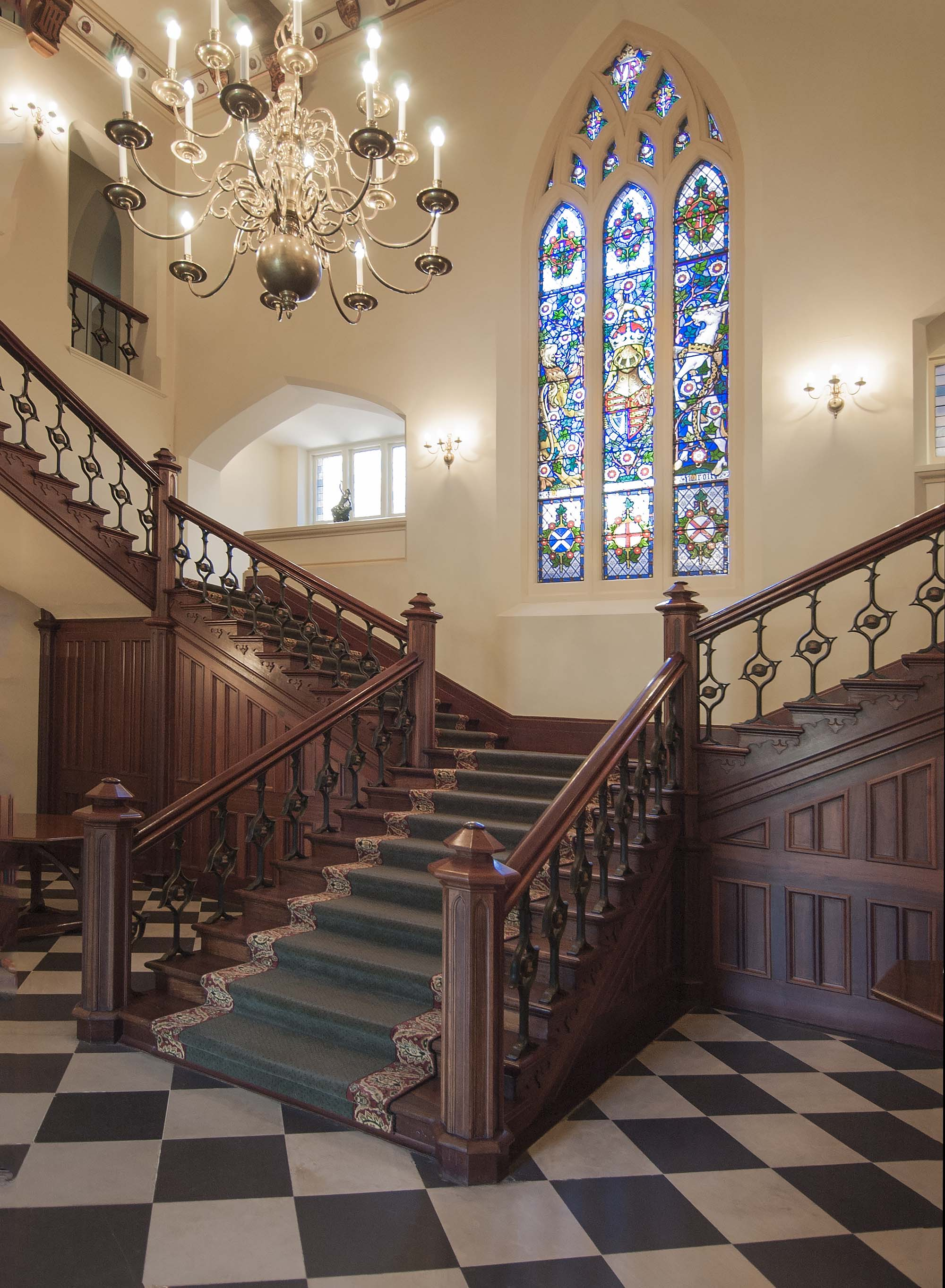
Grand staircase

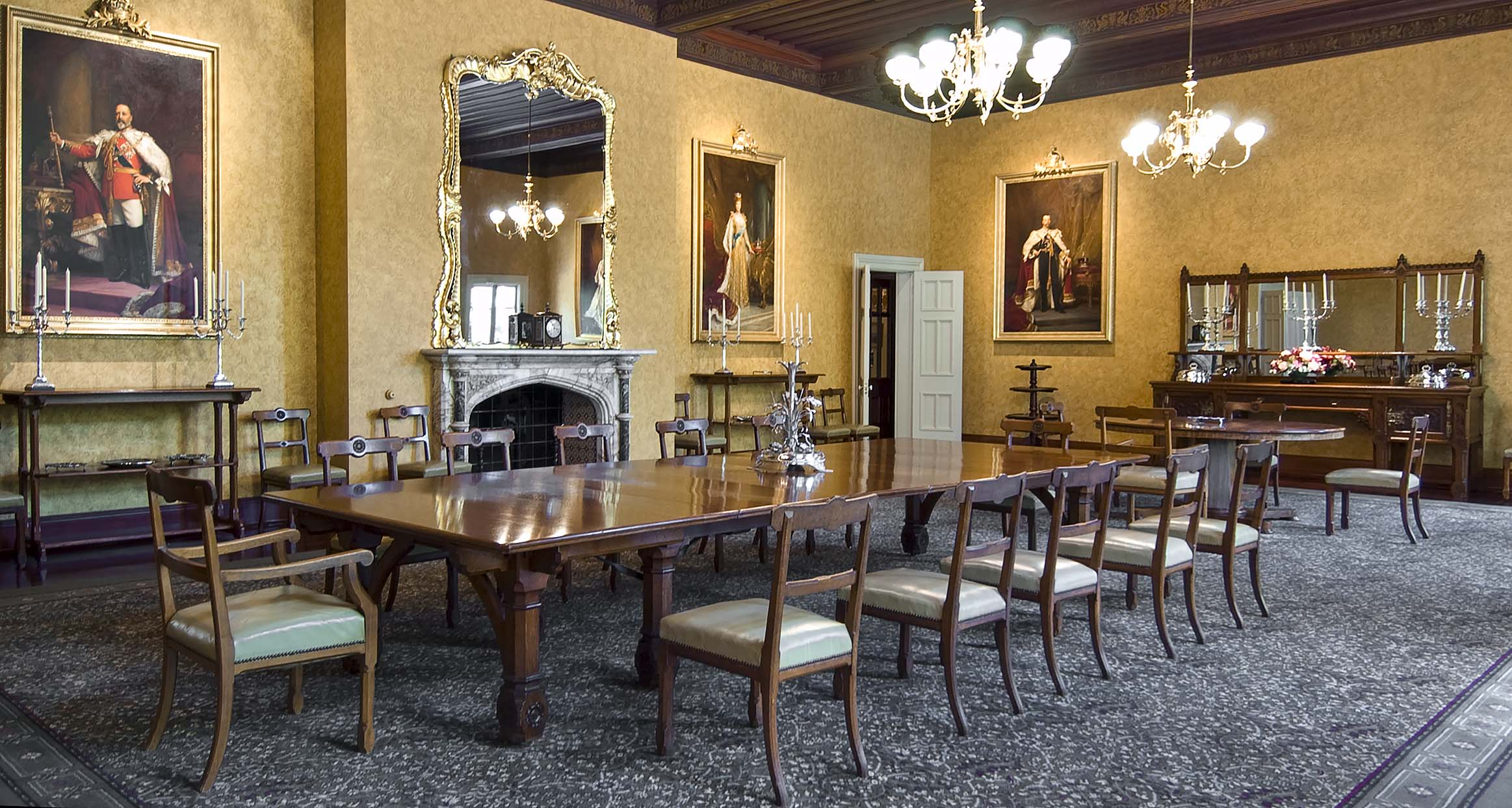
Dining room

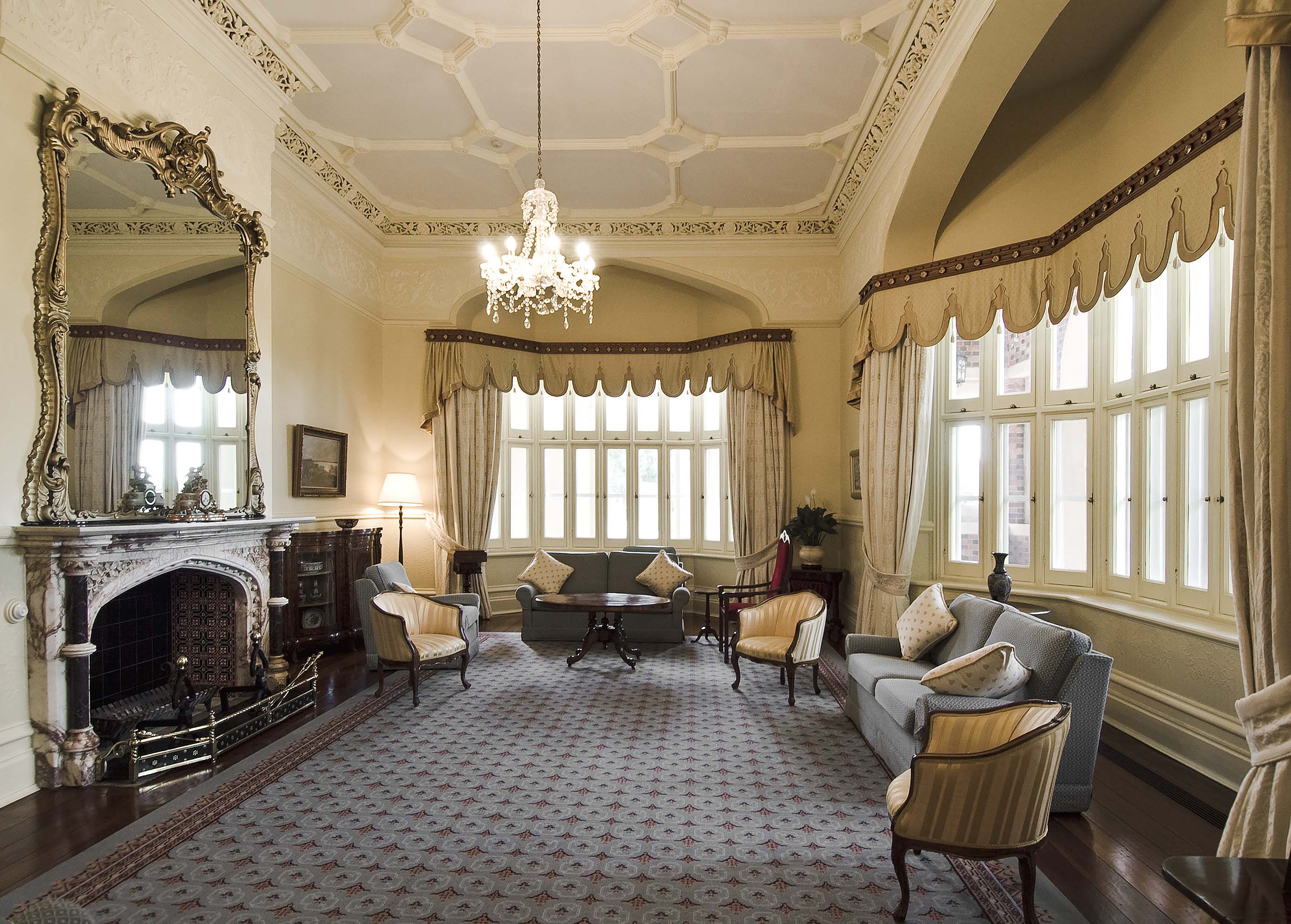
Drawing room

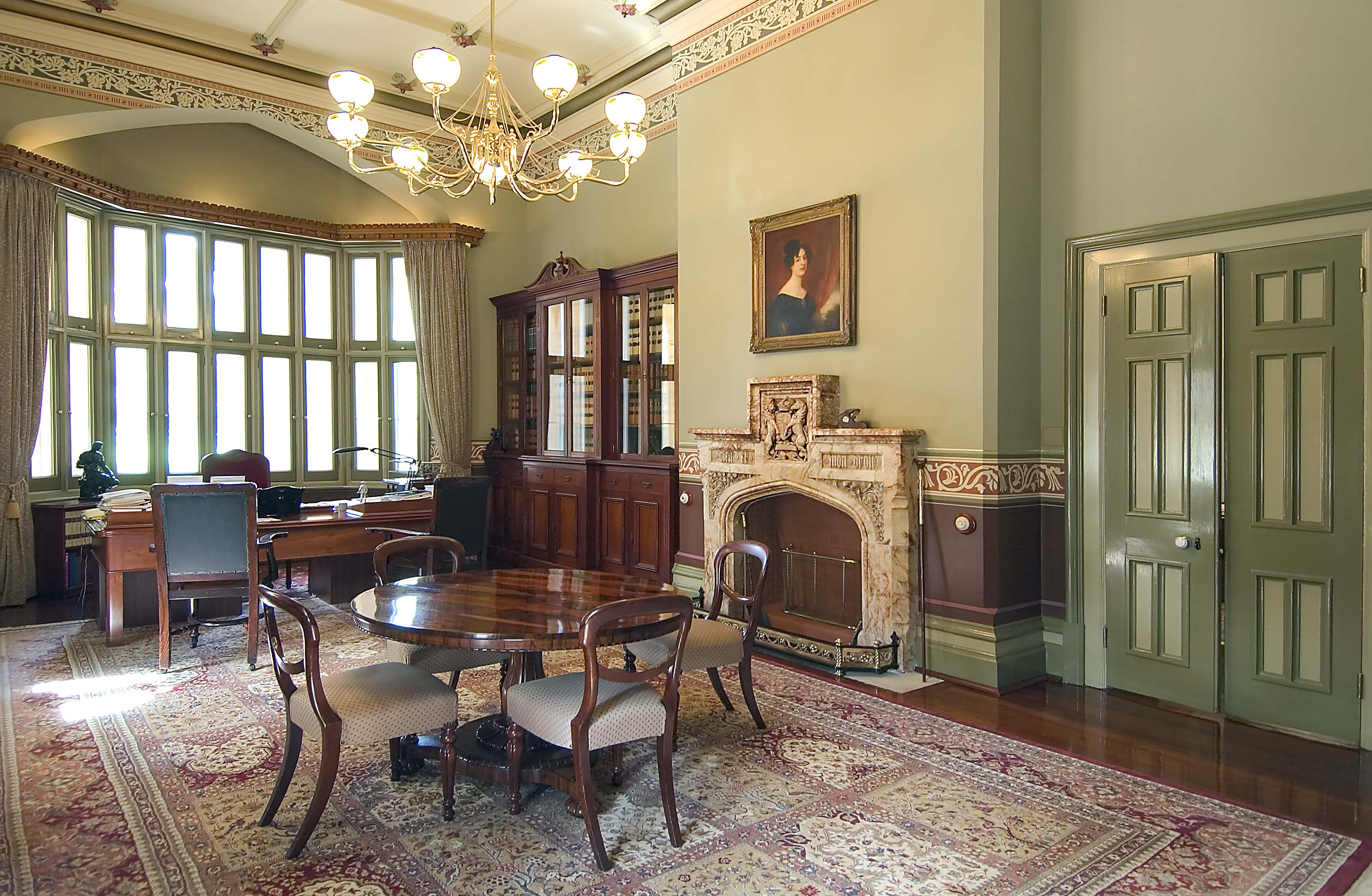
The Governor's study

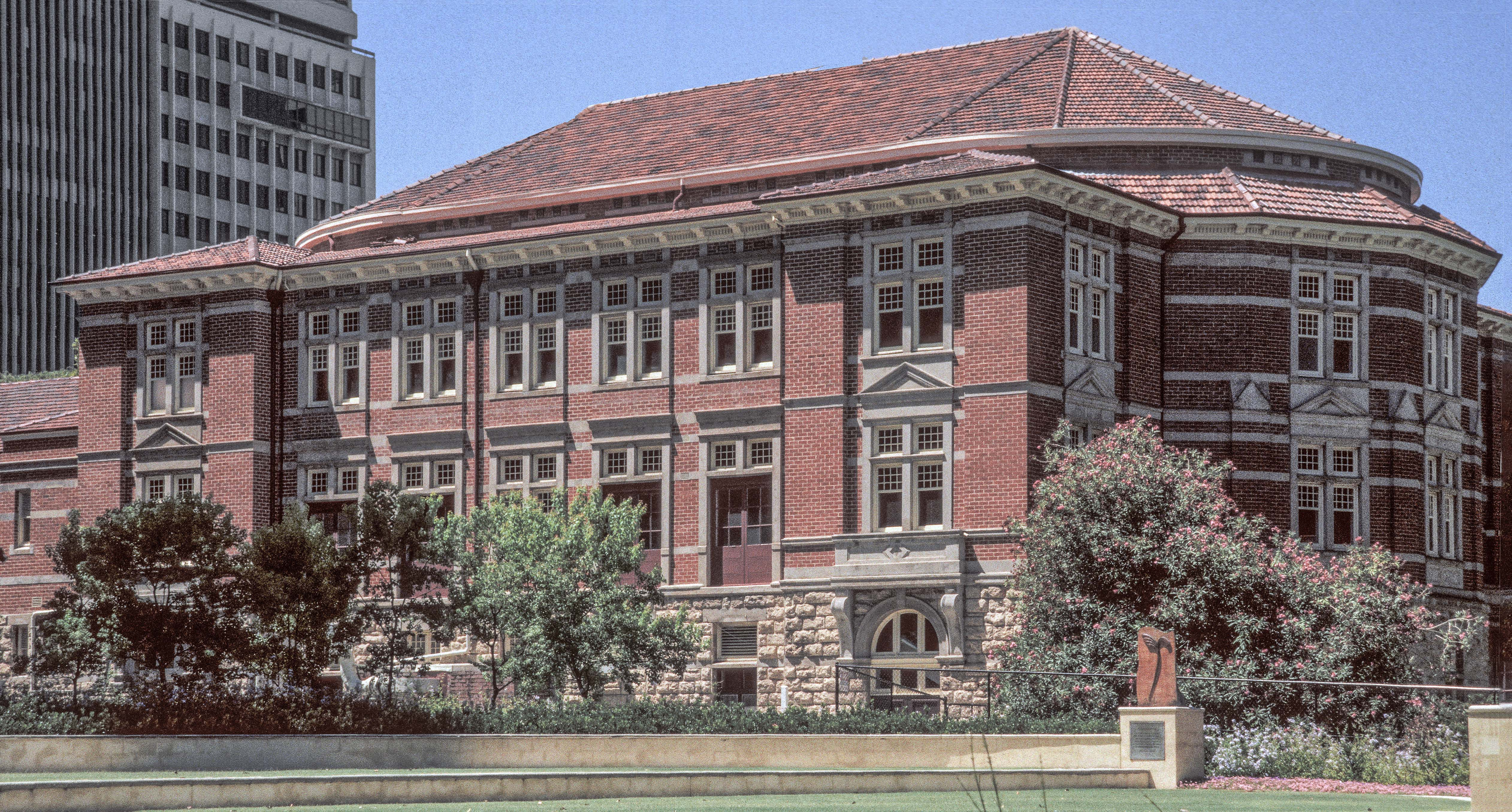
Government House Ballroom, west side

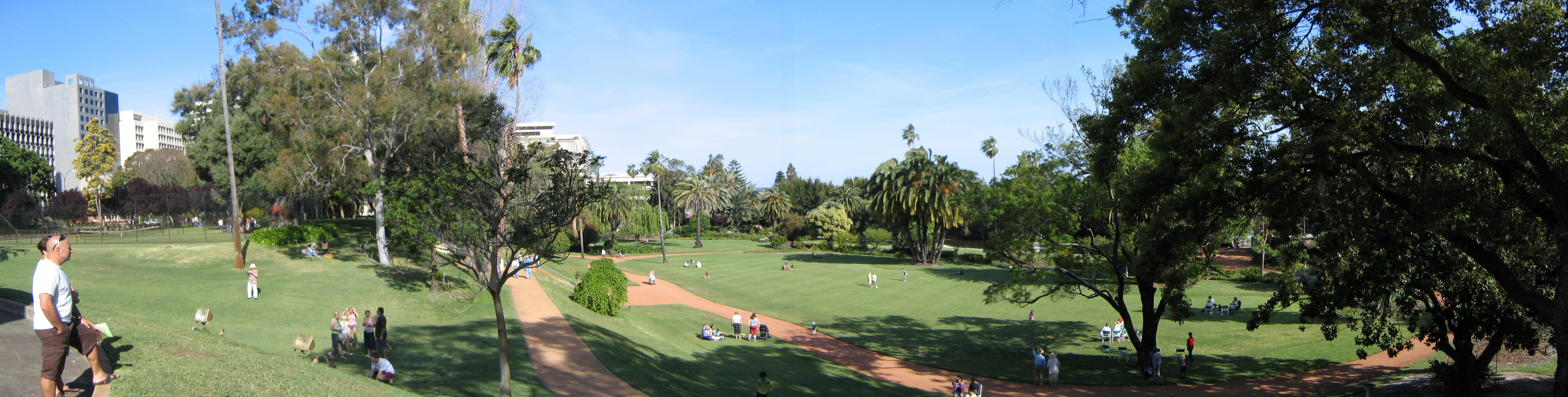
The grounds of Government House on Open Day

== History ==
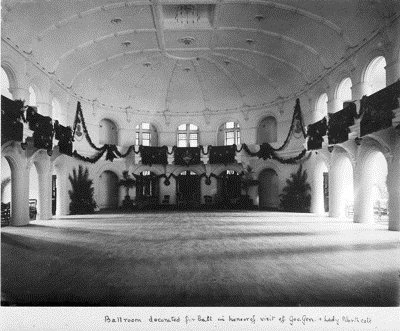
The ballroom in 1907 decorated for a visit of Governor-General Henry Northcote and Lady Northcote.

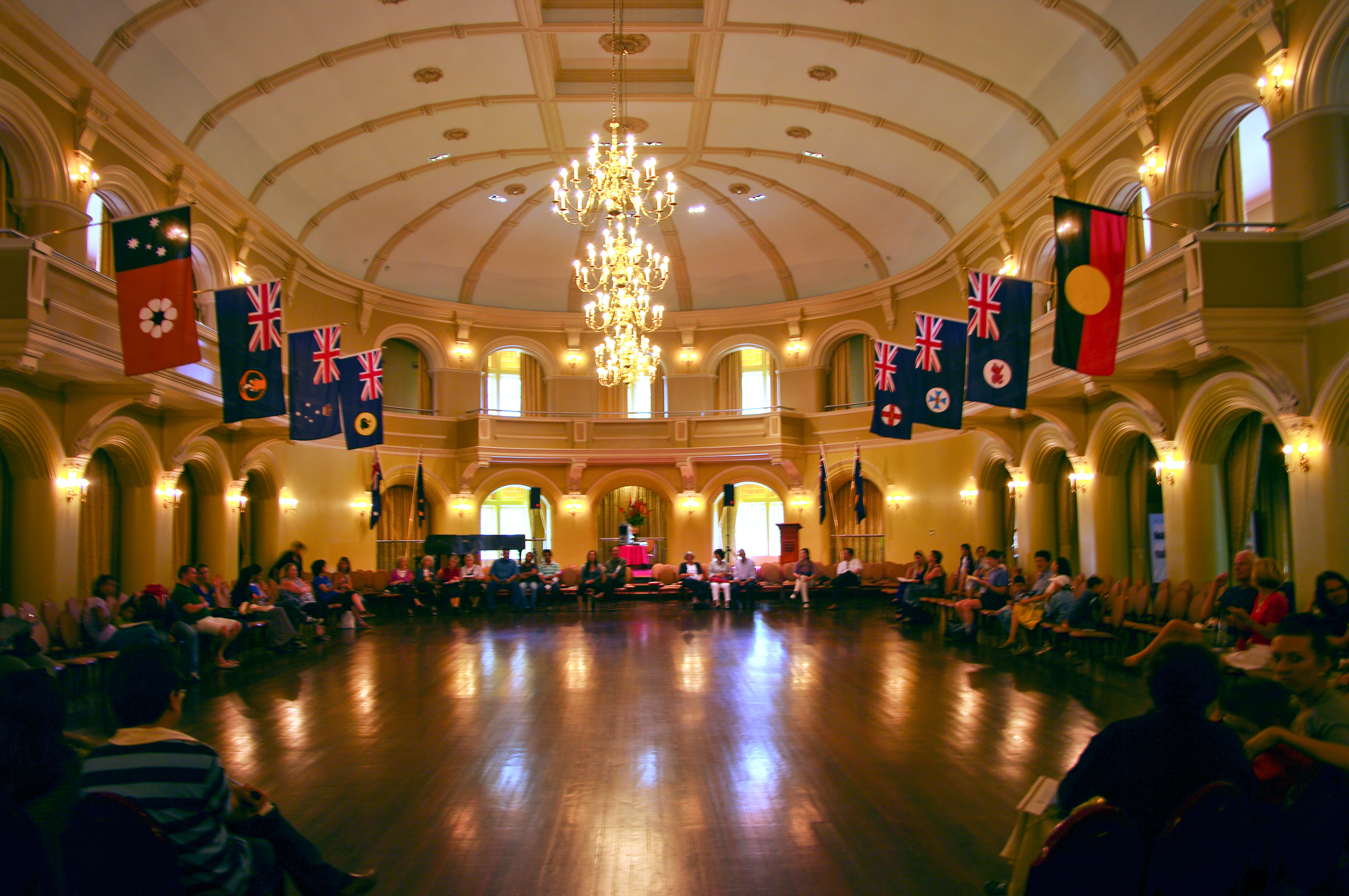
The ballroom 17 November 2011 for Heritage Day.

Following the establishment of the Swan River Colony in 1829, the first governor Captain James Stirling and his family were initially housed in tents on a site near the corner of Barrack Street and St Georges Terrace, known today as Stirling Gardens and Supreme Court Gardens. In 1832, a temporary wooden building was constructed on the same site and used until the so-called original Government House was built a short distance away near the present-day site between 1834 and 1835. This building served successive governors until work began on the new, present-day Government House, for which the foundation stone was laid on 17 March 1859. The 1834/35 building was demolished in the 1880s.

The present Government House was built at a cost of £15,000, equivalent to A$2.2 million in 2022, largely by convicts. Governor John Hampton took up residence in 1863, prior to its completion in 1864. In the 1890s, a ballroom was added, designed by or under the direction of government architect, Hillson Beasley, who designed a number of other public buildings in the city. (Note: According to Martens (2011), the original design was by Hillson Beasley, with chief architect John Grainger involved.)

== Lodge ==
A separate small house, known as the Lodge, was built around 1904 in the north-east corner of the gardens. It provided accommodation for the Governor's police orderly, whose duties required that he live close to the governor, and his family. The Lodge was designed by William Hardwick in Federation Queen Anne style. It was converted for use as offices in the 1980s.

== See also ==
- Government House
- Government Houses of Australia
- Government Houses of the British Empire and Commonwealth

== Sources ==
- "Brief History". Government House. Archived from the original on 29 October 2017.
- Information on display. The Lodge: Government House. 15 October 2017.
- Martens, Jeremy C. (2011). Government House and Western Australian society: 1829–2010. UWA Publishing. ISBN 978-1-74258-340-2.
- Quekett, Malcolm (21 November 2026). "Untold History: Perth Governor's Gardens Grew Along With WA History". The West Australian. "The gardens sit across 3.2 ha [7.9 acres]."
