= Hillson Beasley =

English born and trained architect active in Perth and Melbourne in Australia

- Born: 30 April 1855; Canterbury, Kent, England
- Died: 7 October 1936 (aged 81); Albany, Western Australia
- Occupation: Architect
- Practice: Principal Architect (Western Australia)
- Projects: Government House ballroom Parliament House, Perth; Perth Modern School additions to the original Art Gallery of Western Australia; Midland Courthouse; Fremantle Post Office; Fremantle Customs House; Fremantle Technical College annexe additions to the original State Library of Western Australia

Hillson Beasley (30 April 1855 – 7 October 1936) was an English-trained architect who relocated to Australia, executing his major buildings in Melbourne (1886–96) and Perth (1896–1917). In his later career he was the Principal Architect of Western Australia's Public Works Department and designed many notable public buildings, including the Government House ballroom (1899), Parliament House, Perth (1900–1904), Fremantle Post Office (1907) and the old Perth Technical School (1910).

== Biography ==
Hillson Beasley was born on 30 April 1855 at Canterbury, Kent in England, the son of Edward Beasley and Caroline (née Saunders). He was educated at Wesley College, Sheffield, following which he was articled to an architect in Dover. Beasley then practised in London, Carlisle and Oxford. On 22 December 1877 he married Fanny Clarke at Great Missenden, Buckinghamshire. The couple relocated to the Cape Colony in South Africa, where Beasley worked in the architectural branch of the Public Works Department for three years. They subsequently emigrated to Melbourne in 1886 where Beasley opened his own architectural practice. His works in Melbourne included the Presbyterian (Uniting) Church in St Kilda. Beasley also taught at the Working Men's College and the University of Melbourne.

In 1896 Beasley moved to Western Australia where he joined the Public Works Department as a specification draftsman. In 1897 he became chief draftsman and assistant to John Grainger, who succeeded George Temple-Poole as Principal Architect that year. In 1905 Beasley was appointed Principal Architect, succeeding Grainger. In fact, he had been acting in the position since November 1903, when Grainger departed on extended leave owing to illness. In his role as Principal Architect, Beasley oversaw a great number of new government works and additions in Perth, Fremantle and towns along the railway to the eastern goldfields.

He designed or was responsible for the Government House ballroom (1899), Parliament House, Perth (1900), Claremont Teacher Training College (1902), Perth Modern School (1909–11), additions to the original Art Gallery of Western Australia (1906), Midland Courthouse (1907), Fremantle Post Office (1907), Fremantle Customs House (1908), Fremantle Technical College annexe (1910), the State Library of Western Australia (1911) and the Chief Secretary's Office & Medical and Public Health Buildings (1912).

In 1917 Beasley retired from the Public Works Department. Between 1920 and 1921 he lectured in architecture at the University of Western Australia. In his later life Beasley moved to Albany, where he died on 7 October 1936 and was buried in the local Presbyterian cemetery.

Preceded by John Grainger	Principal Architect; Public Works Department; Western Australia; 1905-1917	Succeeded by William Hardwick
