= George Temple-Poole =

Architect of Western Australia

George Thomas Temple-Poole
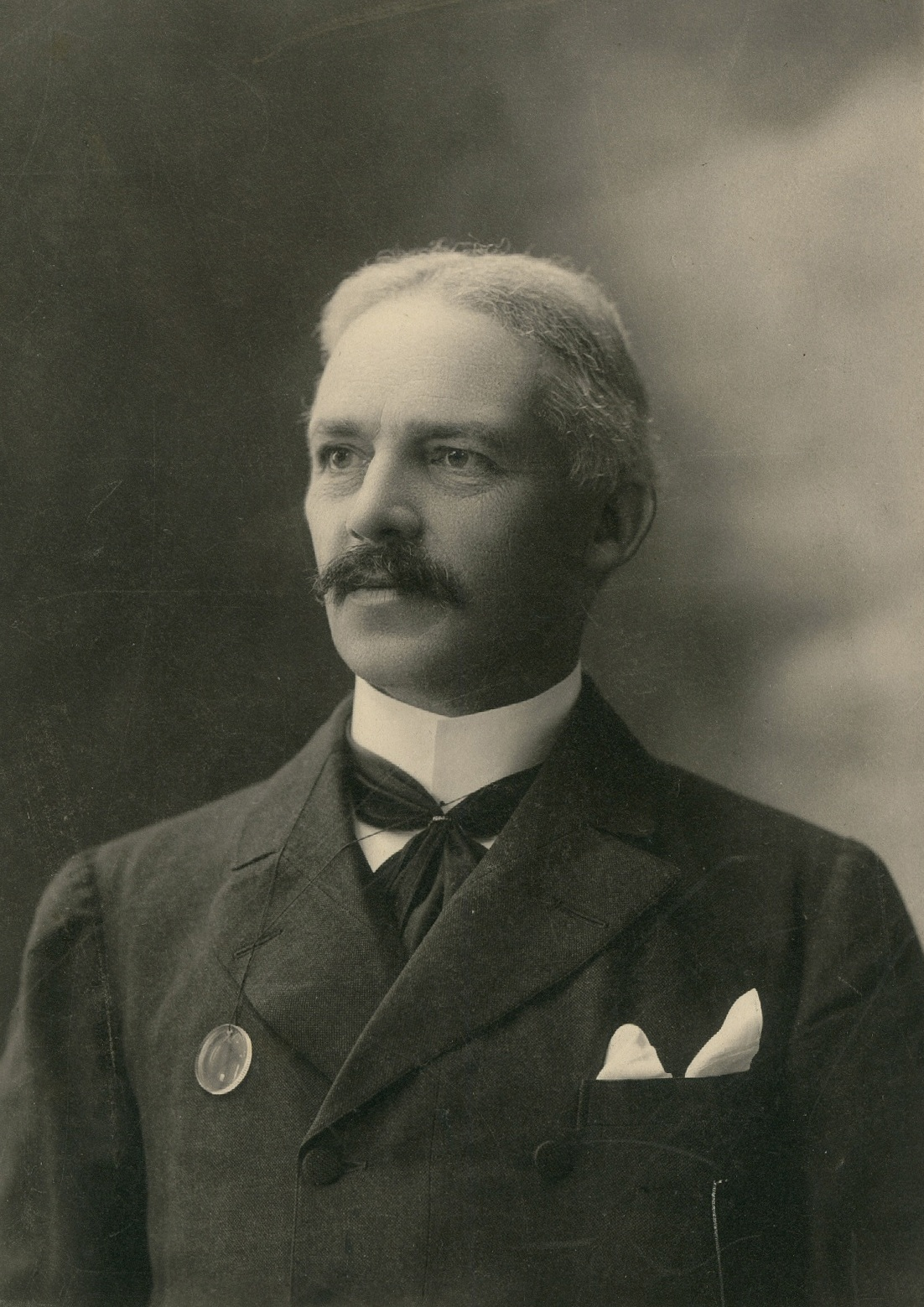
- George T. T. Poole c. 1918
- Born: 29 May 1856; Rome, Papal States
- Died: 27 February 1934 (aged 77); Darlington, Western Australia
- Occupations: Principal Architect, public servant, painter
- Spouse(s): Beatrice Hamilton Banger; Daisy Rossi
- Children: Isuelt (with Rossi)
- Parent(s): John George Temple and Louisa Mary, née Poole

George Thomas Temple-Poole (born George Thomas Temple, 29 May 1856 – 27 February 1934) was a British architect and public servant, primarily known for his work in Western Australia from 1885.

As Superintendent of Public Works, and then Principal Architect, Western Australia, in a period of rapid urban development during the Australian gold boom, he made notable contributions to Australian architecture and town planning prior to federation. His designs for public space and buildings are often identified and preserved by local councils and heritage registers. He also held roles relating to town planning, commerce, the arts, and 'society' of Western Australia. His founding and chairing of committees and institutions included; the Western Australian Institute of Architects (later merged to the Australian Institute of Architects), Perth Park (Kings Park Board), and the Wilgie Sketching Society.

== Early life and education ==
George Temple-Poole was born in Rome, Papal States, to Louise Mary, née Poole, and John George Temple, a Lieutenant Colonel in the British Army. Poole's father died shortly after the family returned to England following the Crimean War. His mother remarried, altering his surname to Temple-Poole. He was educated at Winchester College in England. Articled in engineering and architecture (Note: At least one journal, The Architect, states that he was articled to his father, Josiah George Poole. His mother's maiden name was also Poole, Josiah was her cousin and husband (See ADB).) to a London engineering firm designing harbour works for the River Thames, he then practised in Ceylon for two years before being appointed to the Public Works Department in Western Australia.

== Works and life ==
Poole (the surname he used in Perth) designed a 'series' of public buildings that were constructed in and around ports, towns and suburbs of Western Australia during the Federation Period c. 1890 – c. 1915. While his work was largely influenced by contemporary British movements, Poole contributed in the development of the Australian architectural response to environment and circumstances. He provided a unifying style to the public buildings as government established its presence throughout Western Australia. His buildings influenced residential and non-residential architecture in the state regional centres.

Poole was also an artist, painting in watercolours and oils and was the founder of the Wilgie Sketching Club (1889). He was a prominent Freemason, Anglican and member of the Weld Club, an important member of the Perth establishment.

In June 1902, Poole ran for parliament, contesting the 1902 Claremont by-election (caused by the resignation of William Sayer). He placed fifth out of five candidates, polling just 6.5 percent.

=== Public works ===
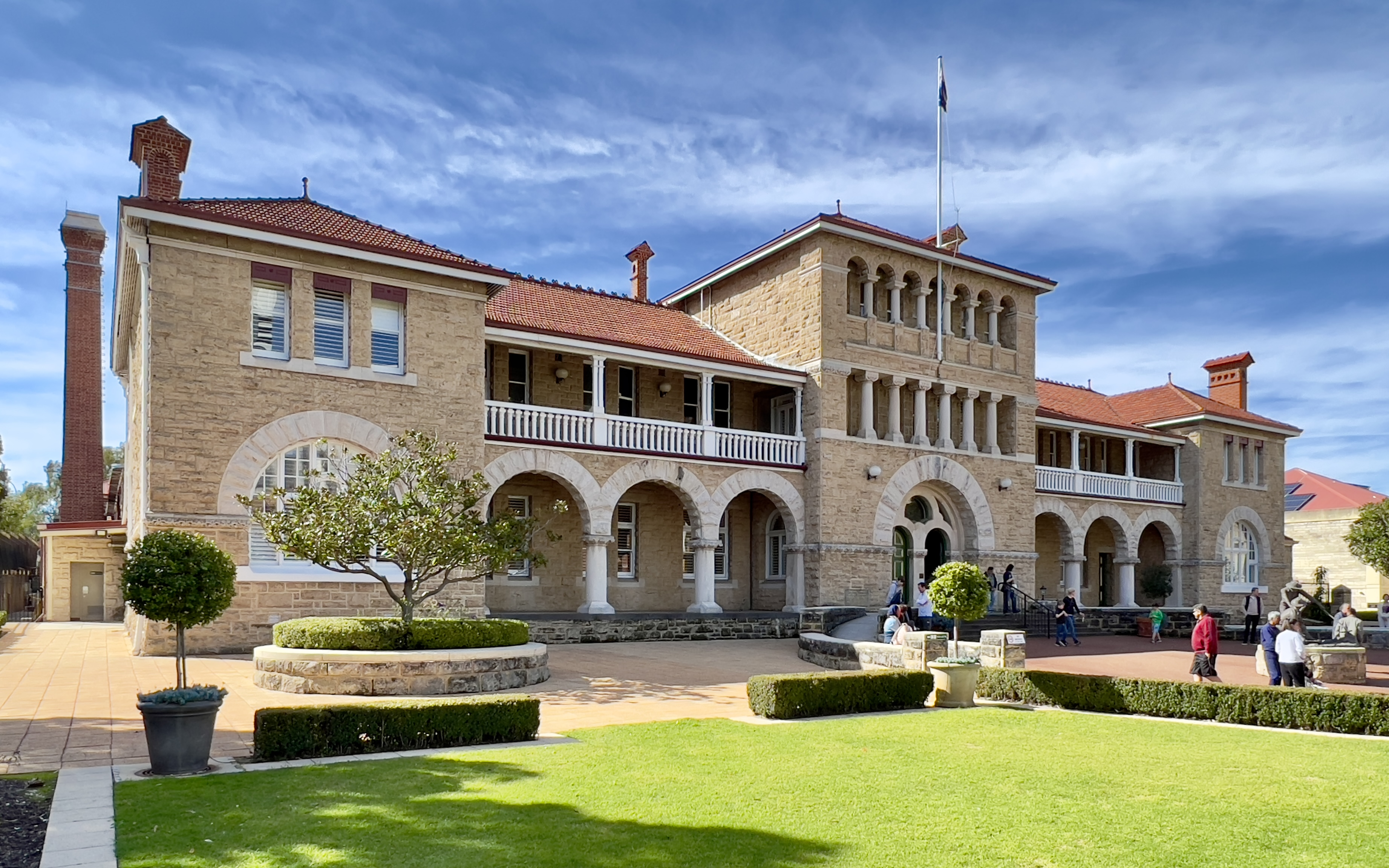
Final work as government architect, the Royal Mint (1899). Controlled by the British crown until 1970.

Appointed by the British government as a supervisor for the Public Works department in 1885, he became head of department in 1889, then assistant-engineer-in-chief and Principal Architect, Western Australia.

The discovery and exploitation of gold and other mineral wealth during his period resulted in increased migration and associated commerce. Prior to this, the colony then state's growth was modest in comparison. (Note: When C. Y. O'Connor, appointed Engineer-in-Chief (1891), arrived in Perth for the construction of Fremantle harbour – he found that the only professional in his department was Poole – who also provided accommodation for his family.)

His designs for were often built in emerging towns, sometimes in very remote areas such as the north west of Australia. One of his first projects was Roebourne (over 2,000 km from Perth) and its port Cossack. The gaol complex, designed in 1886, for that place was an "unusual octagonal" design and featured the use of verandahs, planned (replacing haphazard) siting in a complex, locally quarried freestone walls and slave labour by those to be incarcerated. In 1894 Temple-Poole created design standards for "official" and "public" buildings including banks and assay offices, etc., in the "gold boom" towns Coolgardie, Marble Bar and Cue and the main staging town for the goldfields, York. The goldfields works were sometimes the first permanent structure in locations occupied by "shantie" and other improvised buildings thereby creating centres of government and commerce in what became larger towns and cities in Western Australia.

The siting or replacing of courts, gaols, police stations and other buildings around the state was also occurring at this time, following the establishment of "responsible government" from Perth. He also supervised and designed new buildings or additions for the established towns Albany and York, the port: Fremantle, the centre of government: Perth, and other parts of Western Australia. To meet the significantly increased population, post offices, schools, lighthouses and town halls were constructed in this period. Architectural reference was made to earlier colonial buildings, gracefully acknowledging the prior colonial architects, but existing ones were often removed to site the new plan. Large scale harbour, railway and other planning schemes were also realised during his time as "government architect", and these also required new buildings and structures.

Poole's work contained a variety of design approaches that could display the new government's authority or facilitate public works and schemes. The Lands Department building in Cathedral Avenue, Perth is in the classic tradition. In contrast, plans such as the identical village railway precincts of Claremont and Walkaway have been identified as examples of Federation Arts and Crafts (formerly called English Domestic Revival Style). Claremont was to become a population centre "halfway" between the port of Fremantle and the city. Walkaway, the end of a 400 km railway line from Perth, was abandoned, becoming a tourist destination occupied only by National Trust guides.

Other Federation Arts and crafts buildings include the York railway station buildings, the York Hospital, the Albany Cottage Hospital, the Fremantle Arts Centre Southern extensions, and the Claremont Police Station and other buildings such as the York Post Office and residence contain Federation Arts and crafts features.

Poole resigned from the position of government architect in 1897 but returned from 1900–1902 to finalise works on the Goldfields Water Supply Scheme after the death of its author C Y O'Connor.

=== Later roles ===
After resigning from this position he continued to have an important role in public life; founding or chairing professional organisations and government committees. This is a range of examples:

- Perth Park Board, first chair and plan for Kings Park. Preserved from development and exploitation of resources, as John Septimus Roe originally proposed. He planted lemon-scented gum trees at centennial celebrations ceremony.
- Institute of architects (WAIA), president/founded in 1896. Founding meeting at Criterion Hotel, Perth; Michael Cavanagh – vice-president; John Talbot Hobbs – first treasurer and later president. There had been approximately a dozen practising architects in 1896 Perth and over one hundred within a couple of years. Incorporated 1902

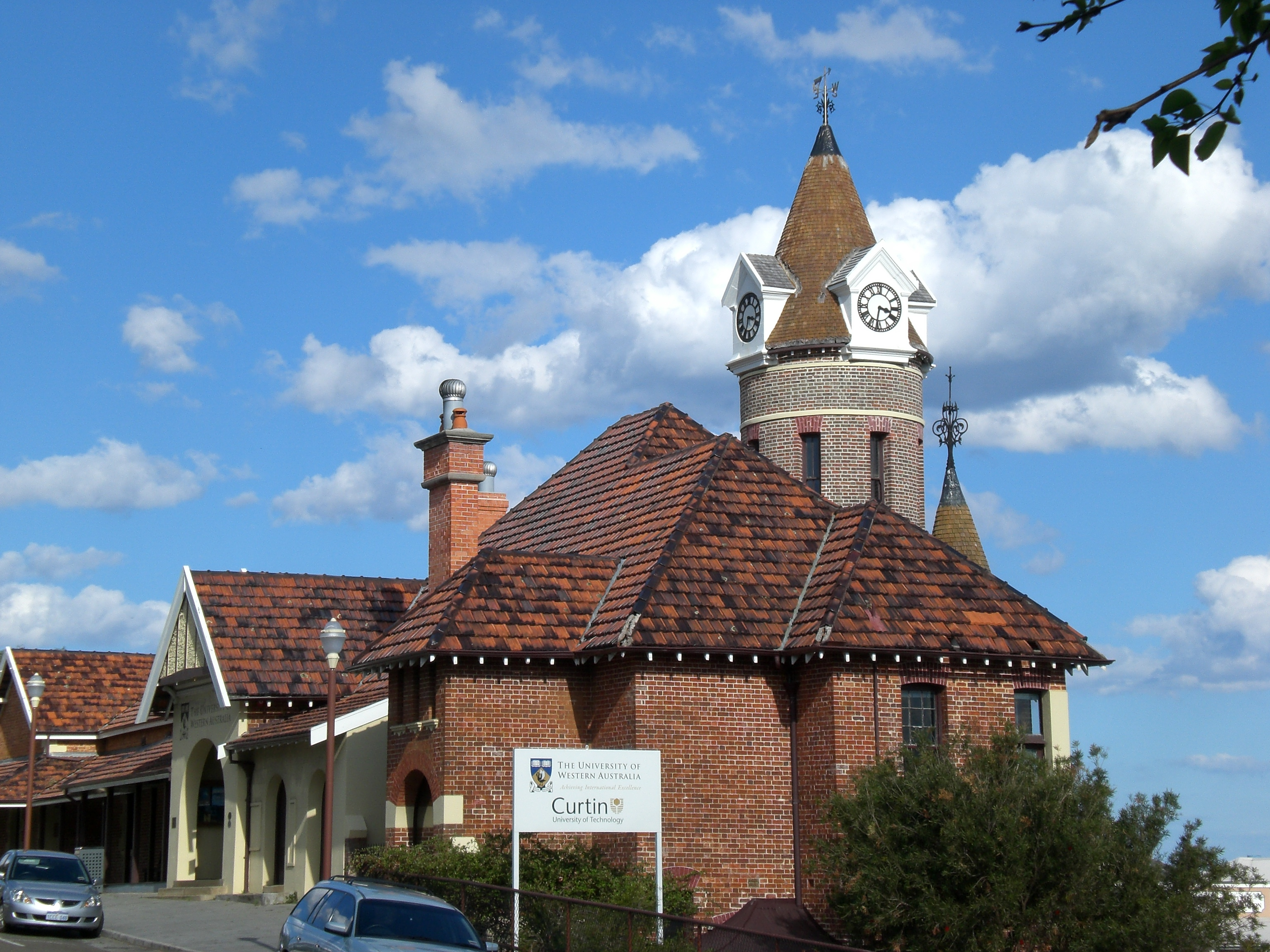
Albany Post Office

- Town Planning association developing a widely discussed plan "Perth as it should be" in 1911, generating interest and debate amongst the general public. His wife Daisy, also a member, continued to promote this plan.
- The company, Perth Tramways, was floated in 1899. This was the first tram system in the state and continued to run for many years affecting the development of surrounding suburbs.
- Poole was to chair an international competition for design of a new National capital and Parliament in Canberra but planning was postponed during World War 1. He also chaired or spoke at interstate and international conferences and lectured at universities and public meetings.

Temple-Poole started a private practice (architectural) with Christian Mouritzen and designed private residences for himself and wealthy clients. His residence, Tagel, overlooking the Swan River from Crawley (Kings Park), was in an English Arts and Crafts style. This burnt down, destroying almost all his private documents and art, but a similar design by him is extant in Cottesloe (Kulahea).

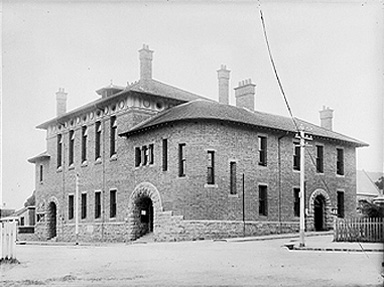
Albany Courthouse

He was also appointed as one of three commissioners to design the new British capital in India (New Delhi) but ill health forced him to decline. This position was taken up by renowned English architect Edwin Lutyens.

Along with his second wife, artist Daisy Mary, he was amongst the overlapping memberships of the new clubs and groups that were forming in Perth at that time. The Wilgie Sketching club promoted local subjects, flora and fauna, and a shift from imitation of English styles and subject matter (Wilgie means coloured clay in an aboriginal dialect). He was well known to the wider community and referred to in the newspapers of the day, including editorial cartoons, and his fame extended to the Eastern States and the 'home country'. They had one daughter and resided in Crawley and Claremont. He retired to the arts and literature community centred around the hills village of Darlington where he died in 1934.

== Notable works ==
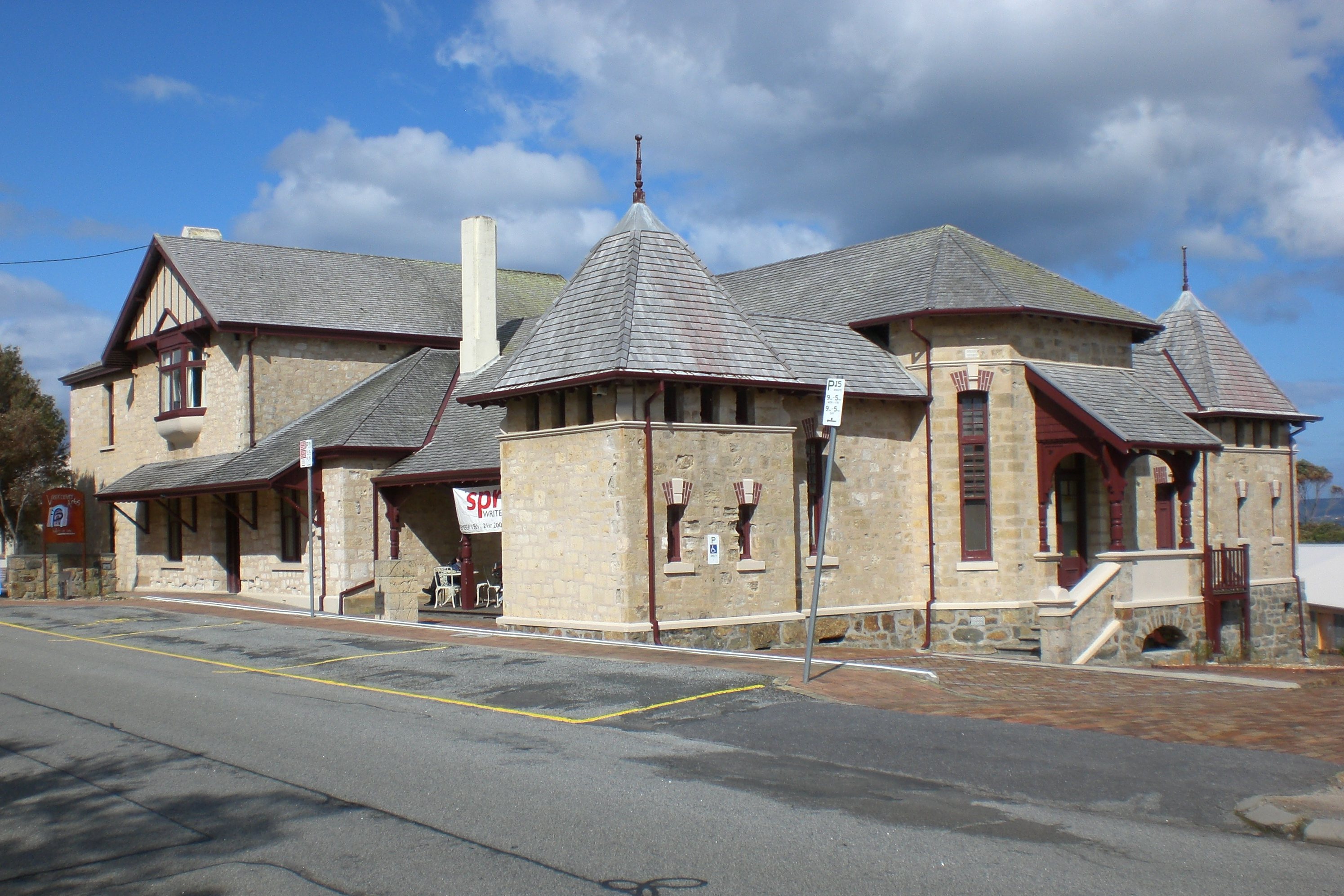
Albany Cottage Hospital

Other examples of Poole's work are:

- Albany Cottage Hospital
- 'Old' Perth Observatory Buildings overlooks Perth City, parliament house and Kings Park. "... many architectural details, apparently unrelated, are combined by the architect, George Temple-Poole, to create an aesthetically satisfying structure which has a structurally sculptural quality." It is now the headquarters of the Western Australian National Trust.
- Perth railway station and the nearby cultural area, including the Jubilee Building and Perth Boys School
- Claremont Police Station and railway precinct, replicated at Walkaway
- Kings Park founding of the Board and initial designs for Perth Park's landscaping and layout.
- Titles Office Building; erroneously titled 'NW wing of Perth Government Offices'. Architectural style Italian. (Note: Superintendent of Buildings, A Dillon Bell described the Titles Office Building in a survey as, 'a memorial to the talent of the late government architect'. Poole had only retired from that position and was still alive.)
- Fremantle Arts Centre – major additions, again sympathetically incorporating earlier designs and materials.
- Perth Government Printing Office Corner of Pier and Murray Streets
- A public building, now the Old Court House Museum, in Narrogin
- York Post Office, Courthouse and Police Station complex, Old York Hospital, Railway Station Master's Quarters and the York Primary School.
- Toodyay Post Office and Court House
- Newcastle Police Stables
- South Fremantle Post Office
- Capitol Theatre, Perth (demolished in 1966)

== Awards and honours ==
- The National Trust of Australia has assessed some of the works he designed as being, 'essential to the heritage of Australia and must be preserved'. Many of his buildings and designs are listed and praised by this Trust and other heritage or historical interest groups of Western Australia.
- Poole Avenue in Kings Park was named in honour of his contributions.
- An Australian architecture award given out by the Western Australian chapter of the Australian Institute of Architects also bears his name.

== See also ==
- List of Australian architects
- List of heritage buildings in Perth, Western Australia
- Perth history in the 1890s
- History of Western Australia
- Architecture of Western Australia
- York, Western Australia
- List of heritage places in York, Western Australia

== Notes ==
| Preceded by Inaugural | Principal Architect; Public Works Department; Western Australia; 1891–1897 | Succeeded by John Harry Grainger |
