= Leonard Walters =

Canadian boxer (1931–2008)

Personal information
- Nationality: Canadian
- Born: 27 November 1931 Vancouver, British Columbia, Canada
- Died: 22 February 2008 (aged 76) Burnaby, British Columbia, Canada

Sport
- Sport: Boxing

Leonard Walters (27 November 1931 – 22 February 2008) was a Canadian boxer. He competed in the men's featherweight event at the 1952 Summer Olympics. Walters died in Burnaby, British Columbia on 22 February 2008, at the age of 76.
