= Western Australia Government Architect =

Between 1891 and 1985 the Principal Architect of the Public Works Department (Western Australia) was responsible for the delivery of the state government's public buildings capital works program throughout Western Australia.

In 2003 the government of Premier Geoff Gallop re-established the office as the Government Architect (now part of the Department of Planning, Lands and Heritage), with the purpose of improving "the design of public buildings and spaces to enhance the quality of the built environment in WA".

== Prior to 1891 ==
Prior to 1901, the Principal Architect was called the Superintendent of Public Works or Clerk of Works or Director of Public Works. Refer to Public Works Department (Western Australia). Those who served in these roles were:

- 1829 – 1838 Henry Willey Reveley
- 1839 – 1851 Henry Trigg
- 1851 – 1853 James Austin
- 1853 – 1882 Richard Roach Jewell
- 1883 – 1884 Francis Bird (architect)
- 1885 – 1891 John Arthur Wright, Clayton T. Mason and George Temple-Poole

== Principal Architects ==
Those who served the State in the role of Principal Architect were as follows:

- 1891 – 1897 George Temple-Poole
- 1897 – 1905 John Harry Grainger
- 1905 – 1917 Hillson Beasley
- 1917 – 1927 William Burden Hardwick
- 1927 – 1930 John Melvin James Tait
- 1930 – 1960 Albert Ernest (Paddy) Clare
- 1960 – 1967 Walter Green
- 1967 – 1968 Leonard Walters
- 1968 – 1980 Stanley Cann
- 1980 – 1985 William Bateman

== Government Architects ==
- 2004 – 2009 Geoffrey London
- 2009 – 2013 Steve Woodland
- 2013 – 2020 Geoff Warn
- 2020 - 2024 Rebecca Moore
- 2024 - (current) Emma Williamson
