= John Arthur Wright =

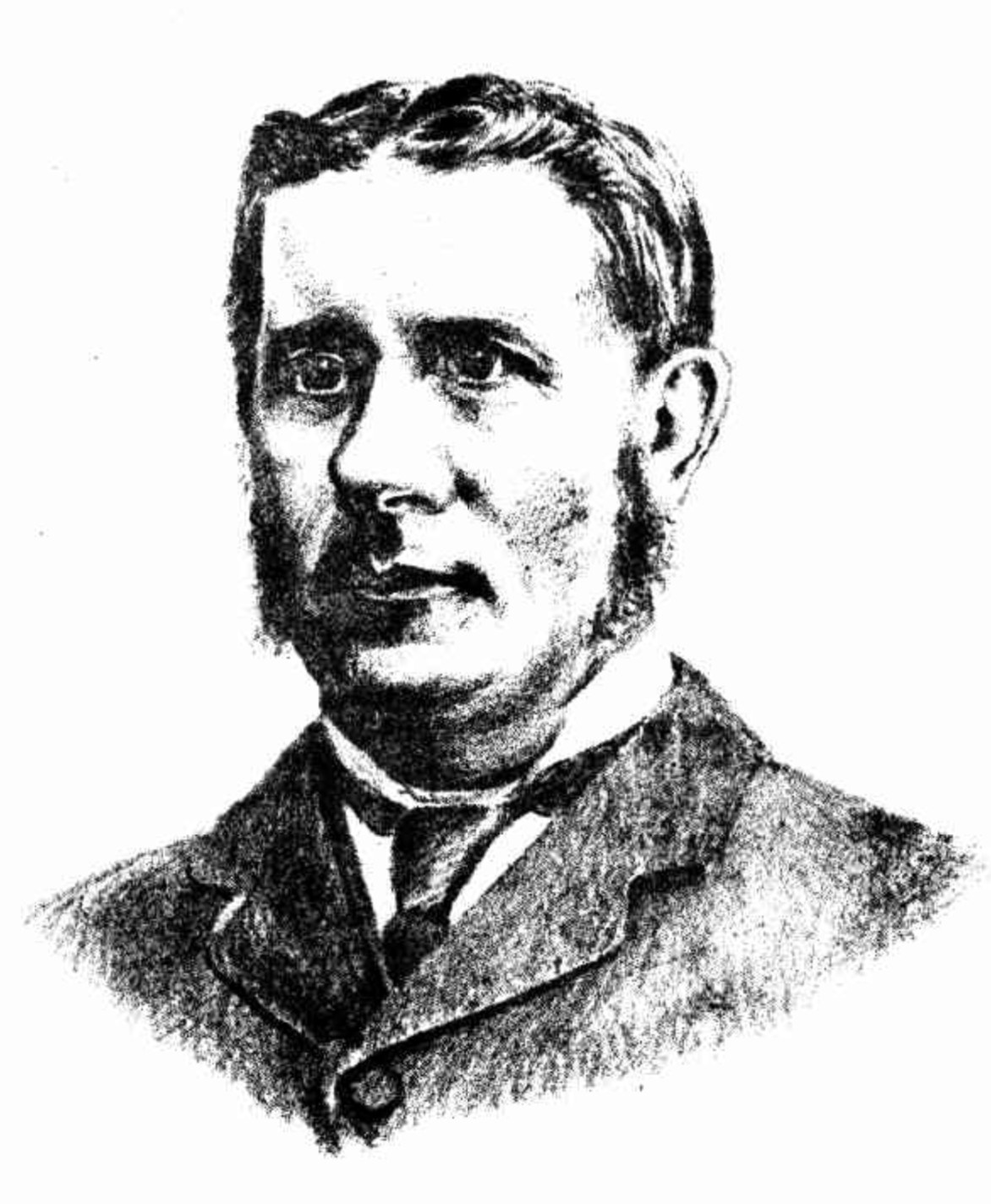
John Arthur Wright in 1887

John Arthur Wright (25 November 1841 – 24 February 1920) was an Australian company manager, magistrate, member of the Western Australian Legislative Council, public service head, rail/tramways engineer, railways commissioner, railways contractor and active Freemason. Wright was born in Dover, Kent, England and died in Albany, Western Australia. He married Katherine Wittington and they had three children together, two sons and a daughter.
