= William Hardwick =

Australian architect (1860–1941)

W.B Hardwick
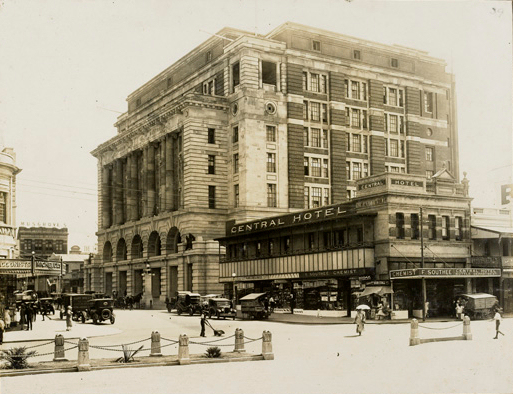
- General Post Office, Perth
- Born: William Burden Hardwick; December 1860; Rylstone, New South Wales
- Died: 2 October 1941 (aged 80); South Perth, Western Australia
- Occupation: Architect
- Practice: Principal Architect (Western Australia)
- Buildings: Northam Senior High School (1921); Bunbury Senior High School (1923); Albany Senior High School (1924)
- Design: Old Modernians War Memorial (1922)

William Burden Hardwick (1860 – 1941), often referred to professionally as W.B. Hardwick, was an Australian architect who from 1917 until 1927 was Principal Architect of the Public Works Department in Western Australia. The Encyclopedia of Australian Architecture refers to Hardwick as being "well known for continuing the high standards of design in public buildings established during the gold boom, particularly in hospitals, schools and post offices throughout the state".

== Family ==
Hardwick was born in Rylstone, New South Wales, the son of Rebecca (née White) and John William Hardwick (1826 - 1891). In 1852, at the age of 26, his father had migrated to Australia with £1,000. On arrival he travelled the south eastern states and sketched the sites as he went. He established a general store in Rylstone and married in 1856. William Burden was the third of ten children and he took his paternal grandfather's first name as his first name and his maternal grandmother's maiden name as his middle name.

== Education and early years ==
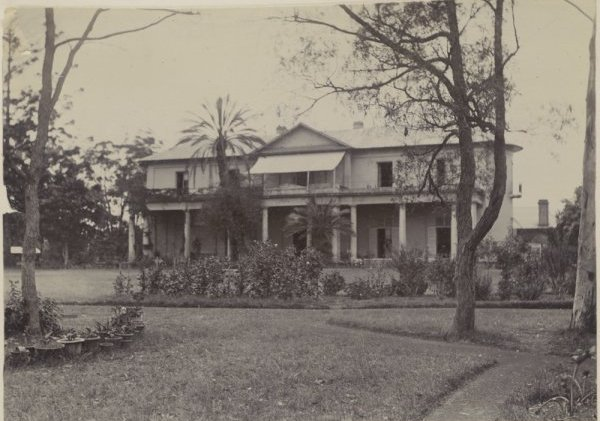
Newington College, Silverwater

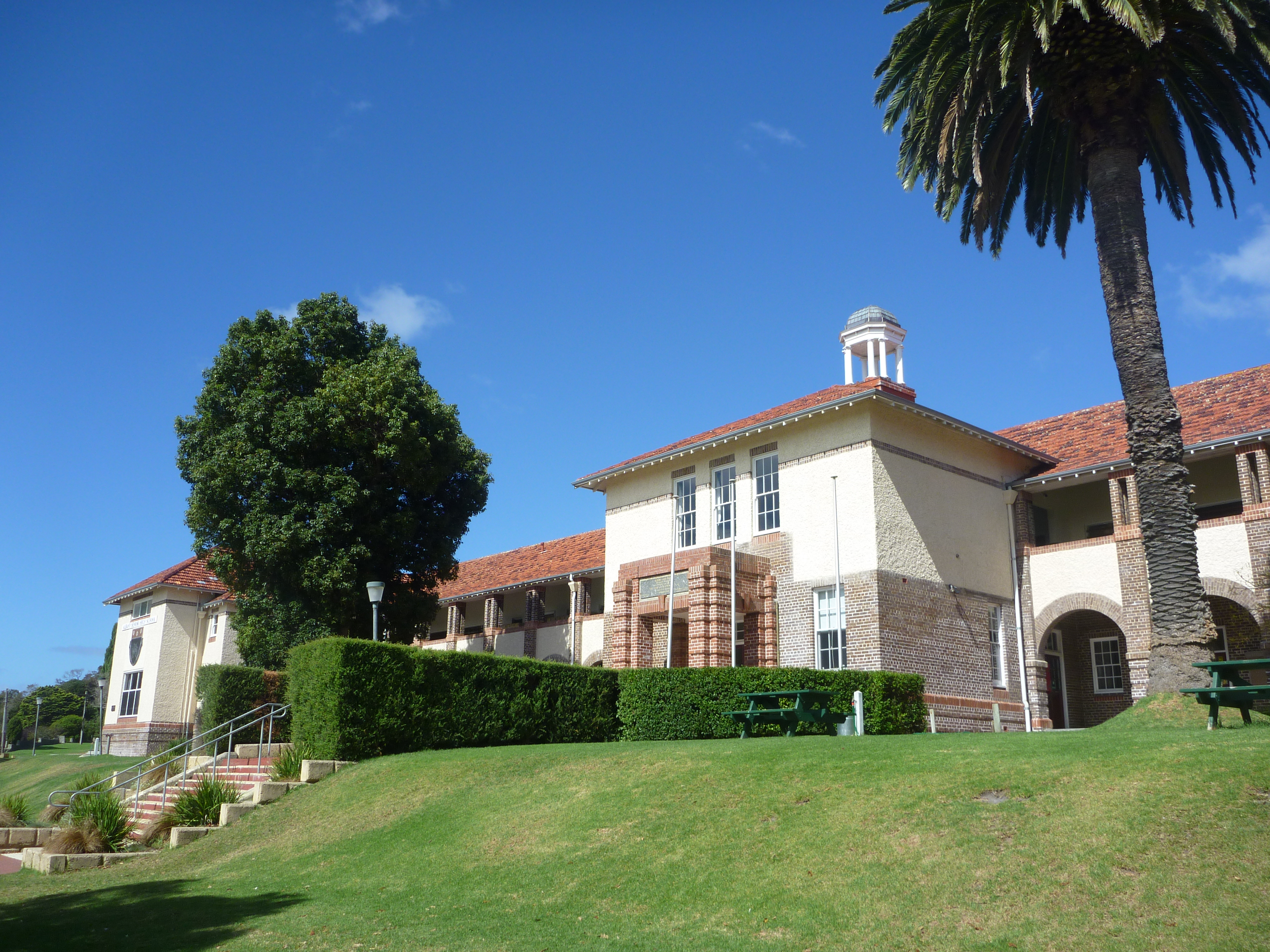
Albany Senior High School

In 1873, at 12 years of age, Hardwick commenced senior education, in Sydney, as a boarding student of Newington College. His older brothers, George and Edward, had started there as boarders two years earlier. The college was then still at Newington House on the Parramatta River and his years at Newington coincided with the Presidency of the Reverend Joseph Horner Fletcher. After leaving school, Hardwick served his articles in architecture in private practice in Victoria and worked in that state until the Australian banking crisis of 1893 when he moved to Western Australia.

== Public Works Department ==
Hardwick moved to Perth and early in 1894 entered the Public Works Department (Western Australia) as a draughtsman. In 1907 he was appointed architect and in 1917 was promoted to the office of Principal Architect. Whilst holding this position he was responsible for designing the Wyndham Meatworks, the General Post Office, Perth (in collaboration with the Commonwealth Architect, John Smith Murdoch), the Albany, Bunbury and Northam high schools, and a large number of post offices throughout the state. The Wooroloo Sanatorium was officially opened in 1915, designed by Hillson Beasley and Hardwick. In 1929, the Point Heathcote Reception Home, later known as Heathcote Hospital, for the treatment of patients with mental illness, was opened to Hardwick's design. He was a Fellow of the Victorian and Western Australian Institutes of Architects.

== Workers' Homes Board ==
In 1912, Hardwick was appointed a member of the Workers' Homes Board on its establishment and in 1913 was made chairman. He held that position until his retirement in 1930 during which time the total capital expenditure by the board was £3,000,000 covering about 5,000 homes.

== Town planning ==
Hardwick visited England in 1910, and on his return published a collection of articles on town planning. Later he was a member of the Town Planning Association and assisted in the drafting of the Town Planning Bill for Western Australia. Hardwick's 1911 proposal to remove the Perth railways yards and to underground the Fremantle-Midland line as far west as Subiaco, and convert the land above to the west of the Perth Station into a grassy mall, graced by public buildings, terminating at its western end in a circus or a Parisian Étoile on which nine streets were to converge, is now celebrated as a lost opportunity.

== Death ==
On his death in 1941, Hardwick was survived by his widow and five children. His younger brother, Harold Robert Hardwick (1866 - 1935), an architect in Mudgee, New South Wales, predeceased him.

Preceded by Hillson Beasley	Principal Architect; Public Works Department; Western Australia; 1917-1927	Succeeded by John Tait
