= York, Western Australia =

York
- Town
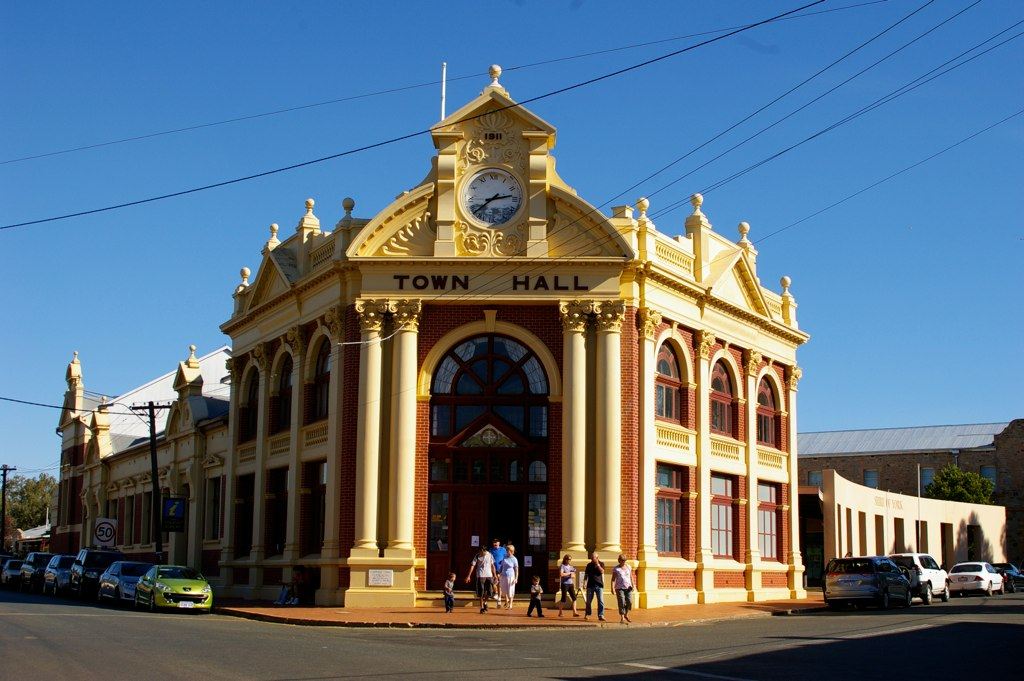
- York Town Hall

- Interactive map of York
- Coordinates: 31°53′18″S 116°46′07″E
- Country: Australia
- State: Western Australia
- LGA: Shire of York
- Location: 96 km (60 mi) E of Perth
- Established: 1835

Government
  - State electorate: Central Wheatbelt
  - Federal division: Bullwinkel

Area
  - Total: 17.6 km^{2} (6.8 sq mi)
- Elevation: 179 m (587 ft)

Population
  - Total: 2,399 (UCL 2021)
- Postcode: 6302
- Mean max temp: 24.7 °C (76.5 °F)
- Mean min temp: 10.5 °C (50.9 °F)
- Annual rainfall: 449.8 mm (17.71 in)
- Website: York

York is the oldest inland town in Western Australia, situated on the Avon River, 98 kilometres (61 mi) east of Perth in the Wheatbelt, on Ballardong Nyoongar land, and is the seat of the Shire of York.

The name of the region was suggested by JS Clarkson during an expedition in October 1830 because of its similarity to his own county in England, Yorkshire. (Note: This became one of the 26 counties of Western Australia that were later designated as cadastral divisions. The counties were named after English notables and political identities of the time. York was therefore officially named after Prince Frederick, Duke of York and Albany, who was until his death in 1827, the heir presumptive to King George IV.)

After thousands of years of occupation by Ballardong Nyoongar people, the area was first settled by Europeans in 1831, two years after Perth was settled in 1829. A town was established in 1835 with the release of town allotments and the first buildings were erected in 1836.

The region was important throughout the 19th century for sheep and grain farming, sandalwood, cattle, goats, pigs and horse breeding.

York boomed during the gold rush as it was one of the last rail stops before the walk to the goldfields.

Today, the town attracts tourists for its beauty, history, buildings, festivals and art.

== History ==
=== Indigenous ===
The Ballardong people, a sub-group of the Nyoongar, occupied the land before European settlement.

=== Post-European settlement history ===
With the increasing population of the Swan River Settlement in 1830, it became evident that suitable land would have to be discovered for the growing of crops needed to provide necessary food.

Ensign Robert Dale, a 20-year-old officer of the 63rd Regiment, led a small party in the first exploratory journey over the Darling Range, during the winter months of 1830 into what was later to be known as the Avon Valley.

He returned with a report of "park-like lands with scattered trees", and after a second expedition, Lieutenant-Governor Stirling concluded that there appeared to be 3,000 square kilometres (1,000 sq mi) of "the finest imaginable sheep-land".

As a result, Stirling decided that the new district should be thrown open for selection and this was done by Government Notice on 11 November 1830. By December 1830, 101,200 hectares (250,000 acres) had been allotted, and in January 1831, another 32,000 hectares (80,000 acres). Before the end of 1831 a further 3,000 square kilometres (1,000 sq mi) in small lots had been taken up.

In September 1831 Dale escorted the first party of settlers to the district, reaching the Avon valley on 16 September. They immediately set about the construction of huts, the preparation required for their stock and the cultivation of new land. Dale proposed an area 3 km (2 mi) south of the summit of Mt Bakewell as the site for a future town to serve the district.

In September 1833 a garrison of eight troops of the 21st North British Fusiliers was stationed at York. Rules and regulations for the assignment of town allotments at York were gazetted in September 1834 and allotments were advertised for sale from July 1835.

A township did not begin to appear until 1836. In July 1836 York comprised two houses, a barn, an army barracks and some out-houses, with about 20 ha (50 acres) of cleared land. The town grew slowly at first due to difficulties with the local aboriginals, as well as problems associated with using English farming techniques in an unfamiliar climate. (Note: Documentary evidence in Heritage Conservation Plan for Marwick's Shed, Rachel Plug et al., p. 11.)

In 1831, Revett Henry Bland settled in York, and with his business partner, Arthur Trimmer, leased a 4.0 ha (10 acres) site north of the town (on which they had built the first house, by the end of September 1831) (Note: This was on Suburban Lot A1, and according to George Fletcher Moore, the house was 91 metres (100 yd) above the ford:) and took a grant over a 1,600 ha (4,000 acres) block to the south which they established as a farm, later called Balladong Farm, after the Ballardong Noongar, the Aboriginal occupiers of the area. Later, part of the land to the south came to be called Bland's Town or Bland Town. Bland was resident magistrate from 1834 to 1842.

In 1836, John Henry Monger Snr arrived and bought the 4.0 ha (10 acres) of land immediately north of the town site from Bland and Trimmer for £100 on which the first house in York had been constructed of wattle and daub. Monger opened a hotel by early 1837, constructing in 1842 a "long, low building" opposite the hotel for a store, and "every three months his wagons would journey to Guildford or Perth for supplies".

In July 1836 Lieutenant Henry William St Pierre Bunbury of the 21st Regiment was sent to York to respond to rising levels of violence between colonial settlers and Ballardong Noongar people. His mission was "to make war upon the native". After many individual skirmishes and killings of Ballardong people, rumours of an attack on the natives, in which "several ... were wounded, and one woman was killed", were reported. In response to this, Ballardong people speared a shepherd called Knott. Bunbury initially tried to cover up Knott's death to avoid further conflict.

In July 1837 Bunbury was again sent to the York district after the spearing deaths of two young settlers called Chidlow and Jones. In the ensuing violence soldiers and settlers killed at least 18 Ballardong Noongar people.

In 1840, the York Agricultural Society was established, which became very influential in the following years, holding annual shows to the present day. The York Racing Club was established in 1843. Both societies continue today.

A shortage of labour was a problem for the farming community, particularly at harvest time. A sandalwood boom in the late 1840s lifted the town.

At the request of the influential York Agricultural Society, from 1851, convicts were transported to the Colony and relieved the labour shortages. As "ticket-of-leave" men, they constructed many of the early buildings. (Note: e.g. Holy Trinity Church, Faversham House stage two, the Castle Hotel old section; St Patricks and most likely Old St Patrick's, the Uniting Church chapel, the CWA building, Kairey Cottage and the rear building behind Gallery 152, but not the Cell Block behind the Courthouse which was constructed by the 20th Company Royal Sappers and Miners: Perth Gazette and Independent Journal of Politics and News, 20 August 1852, p.3. Former convicts built Settlers House and designed St Patricks.)

Solomon Cook constructed a flourmill in 1851 and then steam engine in 1852 to power his mill.

York was connected by rail in 1885. Following the discovery of gold in the Yilgarn in 1887, the town was teeming with miners, all alighting from the train and preparing to make the long journey across the plains to the goldfields.

In the 1880s the question as to whether or not the railway line to the Goldfields should be run through York or Northam was the subject of bitter debate. "Tradition is that State Parliamentarians became so tired of hearing the rival Northam/York arguments that they suggested that representatives of the two towns decide the issue by a game of cards." In December 1891, the State Government decided that the line should run through Northam because the distance to Yilgarn was 24 km (15 mi) shorter and £500 cheaper.

The 1968 Meckering earthquake damaged a number of buildings and resulted in removal of the Royal Hotel.

Between 1968 and 1971, due to the general downturn in rural activities, and a progressive reduction in railway operations in favour of Northam, many York businesses closed and the population reduced.

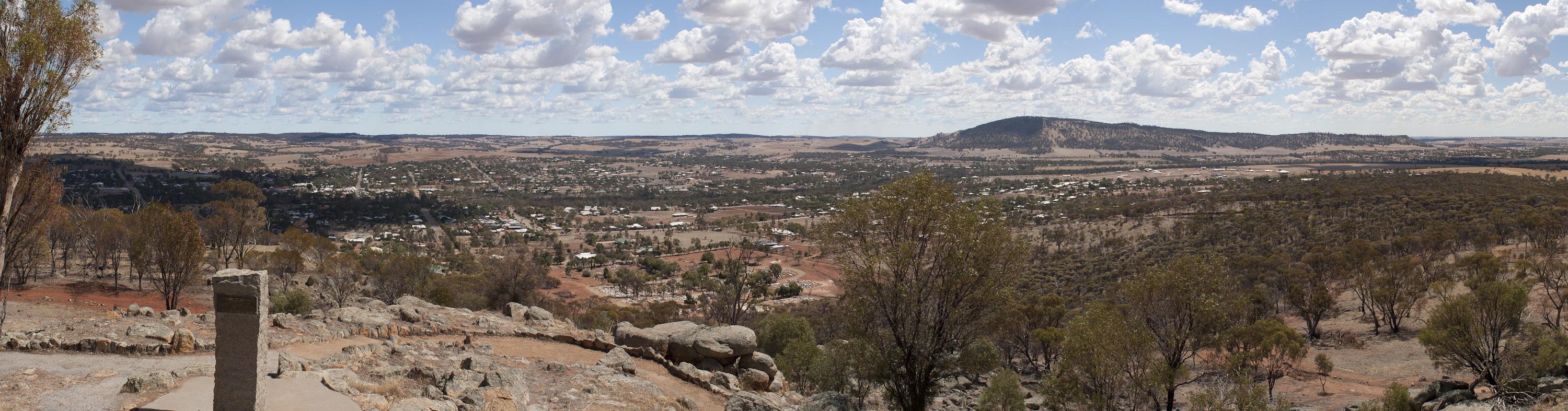
Panoramic view of York and the Avon Valley from Mount Brown

== Attractions ==
York is located in the valley between Mount Bakewell and Mount Brown, known to the Ballardong Noongar as Walwalling and Wongborel. On the road to York in Spring are canola fields which draw many tourists.

In addition to its heritage and Arts and Crafts buildings and other architecture, the town features the York Motor Museum, the Courthouse complex, galleries, bric-à-brac and book shops, skydiving and paragliding, and walks along the picturesque Avon River and up Mt Brown.

The main attractions in the town include:

- Avon Terrace, the main street, lined with heritage buildings
- The York Motor Museum, holding 60 vintage cars and 16 motor cycles and other vehicles as well as motor memorabilia
- The York Town Hall
- The Courthouse complex, which is now a commercial gallery, and the 1852 cells
- The giant straw (wara art) sculptures of endangered animals
- The Residency Museum
- The Suspension Bridge (also called the Swing Bridge)
- Faversham House
- Blandstown, a very rare hamlet with many mid to late 19th century homes, unspoilt by development
- Historic churches, particularly St Patrick's Church, Holy Trinity Church, and the Uniting Church, and their adjoining church halls

The main attractions outside the town include Australia's oldest racecourse. In addition to the historic Faversham House the town has four historic hotels: Settlers House, the York Palace Hotel, the Imperial Hotel and the Castle Hotel. The town is popular with walkers, cyclists, and photographers.

York offers a splendid wildflower garden behind Faversham House, as well as Avon Park, next to the town on the river, and Peace Park.

The York Agricultural Show and The York Festival are normally held in September and October each year.

== Heritage buildings ==
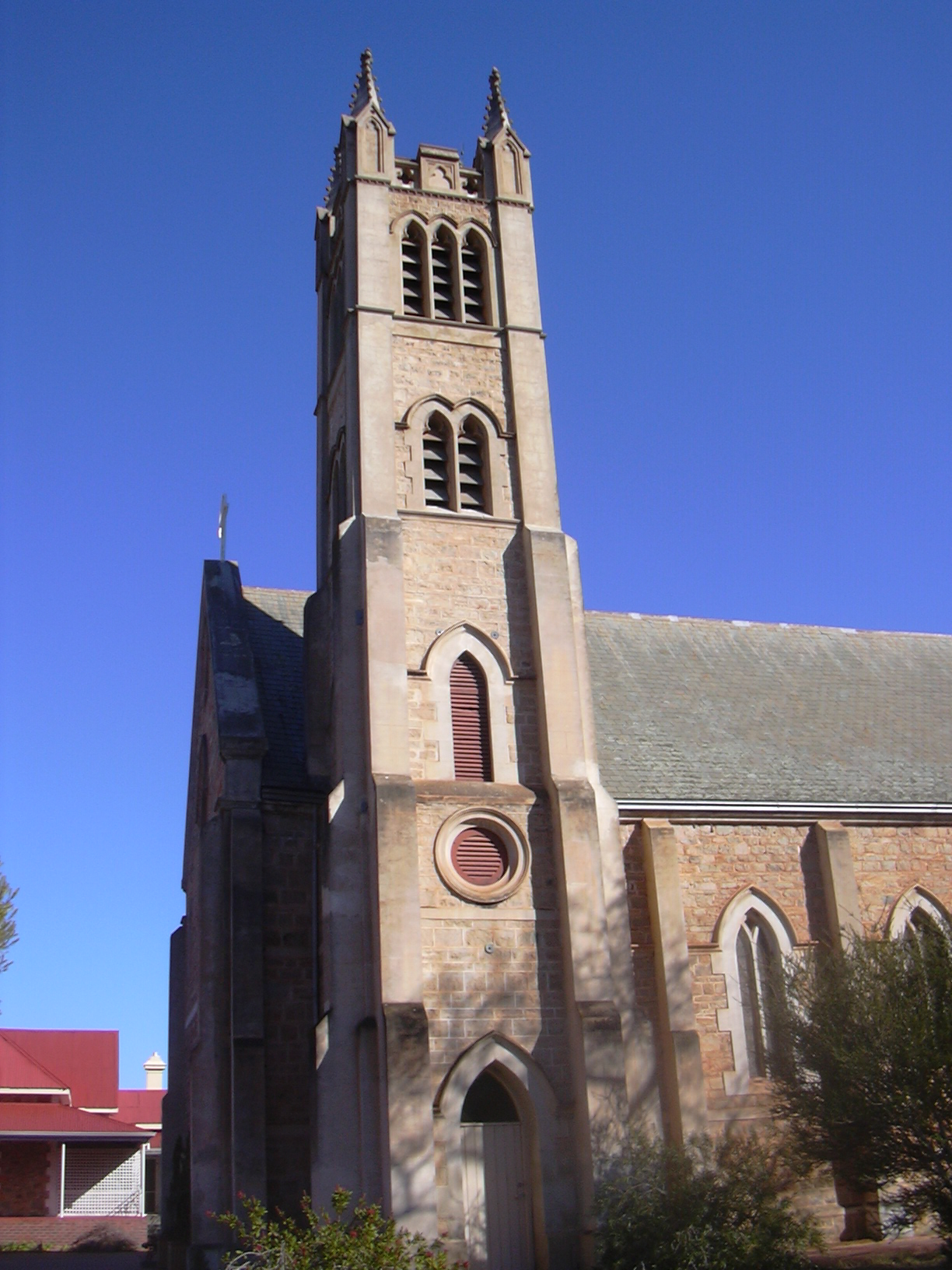
St Patrick's Church was designed by Joseph Nunan (1874–1886)

For a town of its size, there are more heritage buildings in York than in any other town in Western Australia. not only that, the entire town has been declared a "Historic Town" by the National Trust of Australia. The streets of York are lined with buildings both big and small that evoke the essence of the nineteenth century. The main street, Avon Terrace, remains almost exactly as it was in 1911, the year that the spectacular Town Hall was constructed. But behind the main street lie a wealth of historic houses and cottages and places of interest each with its own story and of the generation of people who lived in them.

With its hamlet Bland's Town, York has buildings from each decade from the early settlers (1830s and 1840s), the convict period (1850s and 1860s), the coming of rail (1885), the Gold Rush (1887 to 1900), and the Federation boom, culminating in the York Town Hall (1911).

Faversham House, overlooking the north end of Avon Terrace, is one of the grandest surviving Colonial homes in the State.

More than 200 buildings or sites in York are heritage listed, most within the town itself. Many of York's older homes and buildings have now been restored and, while some have retained their original use (e.g. the York Post Office), others have been adaptively re-used with success, such as the former York Primary School (1886).

Gallery of some Heritage Buildings in York

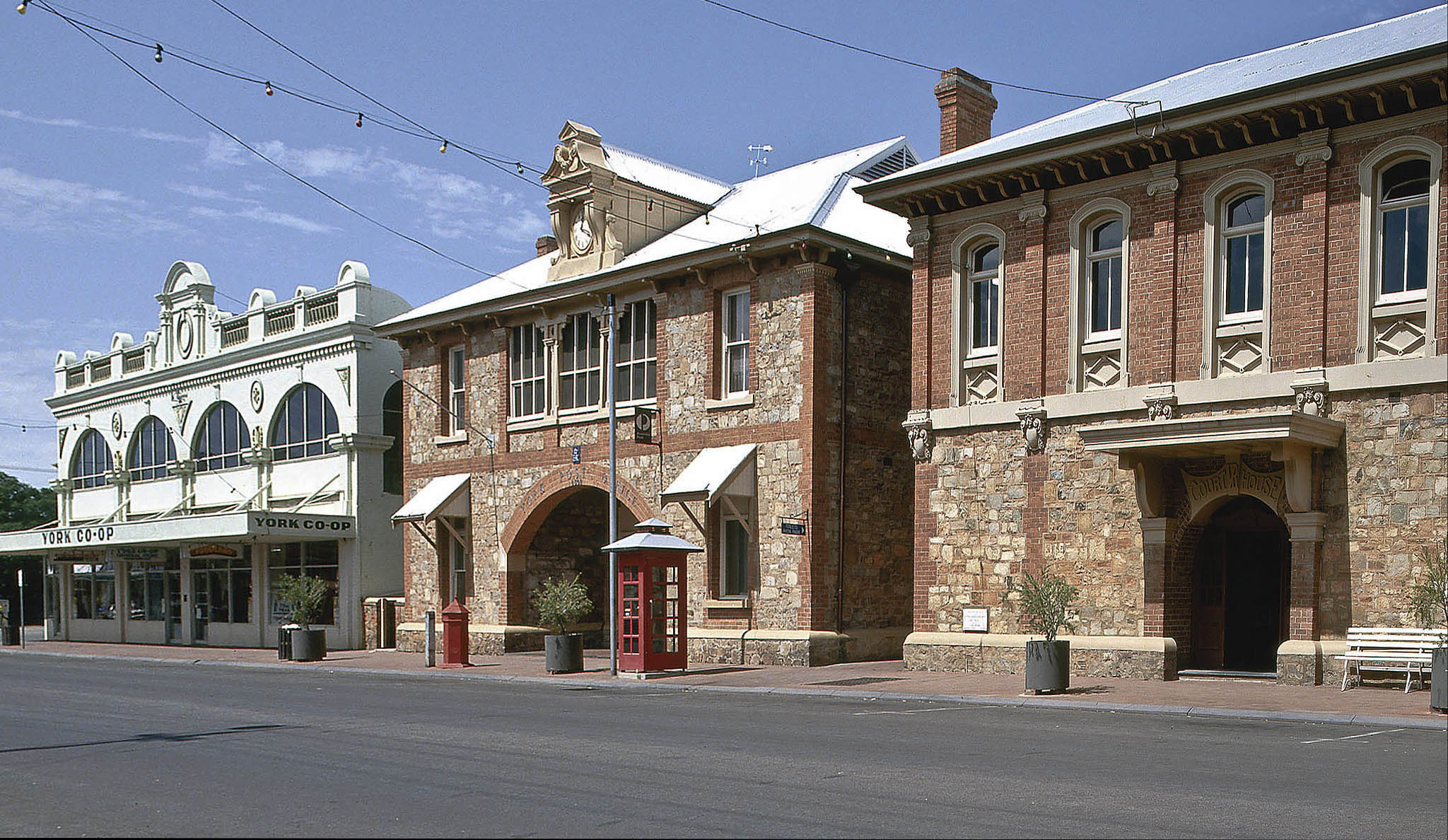
Co-op, York Post Office, Courthouse

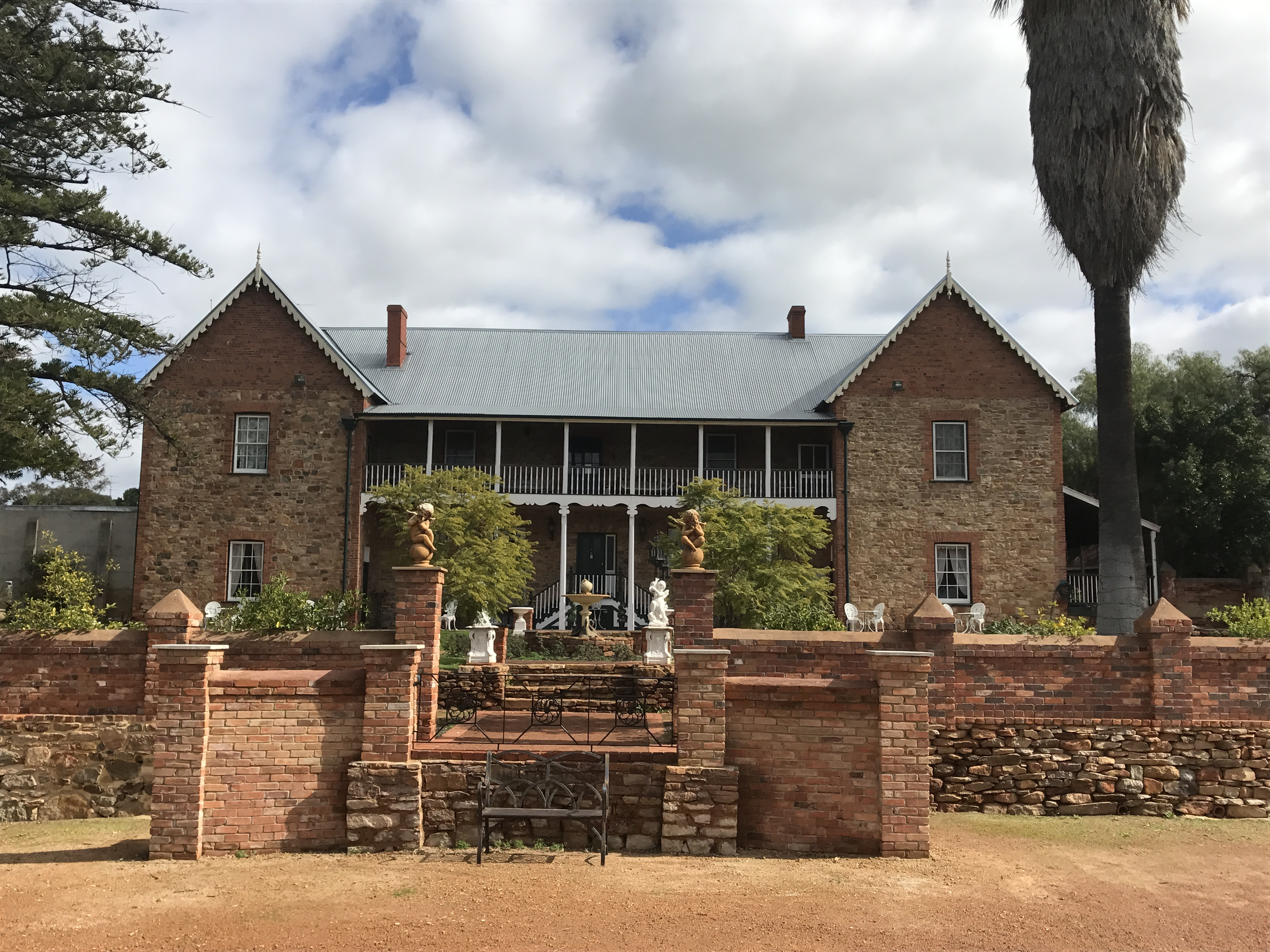
Faversham House

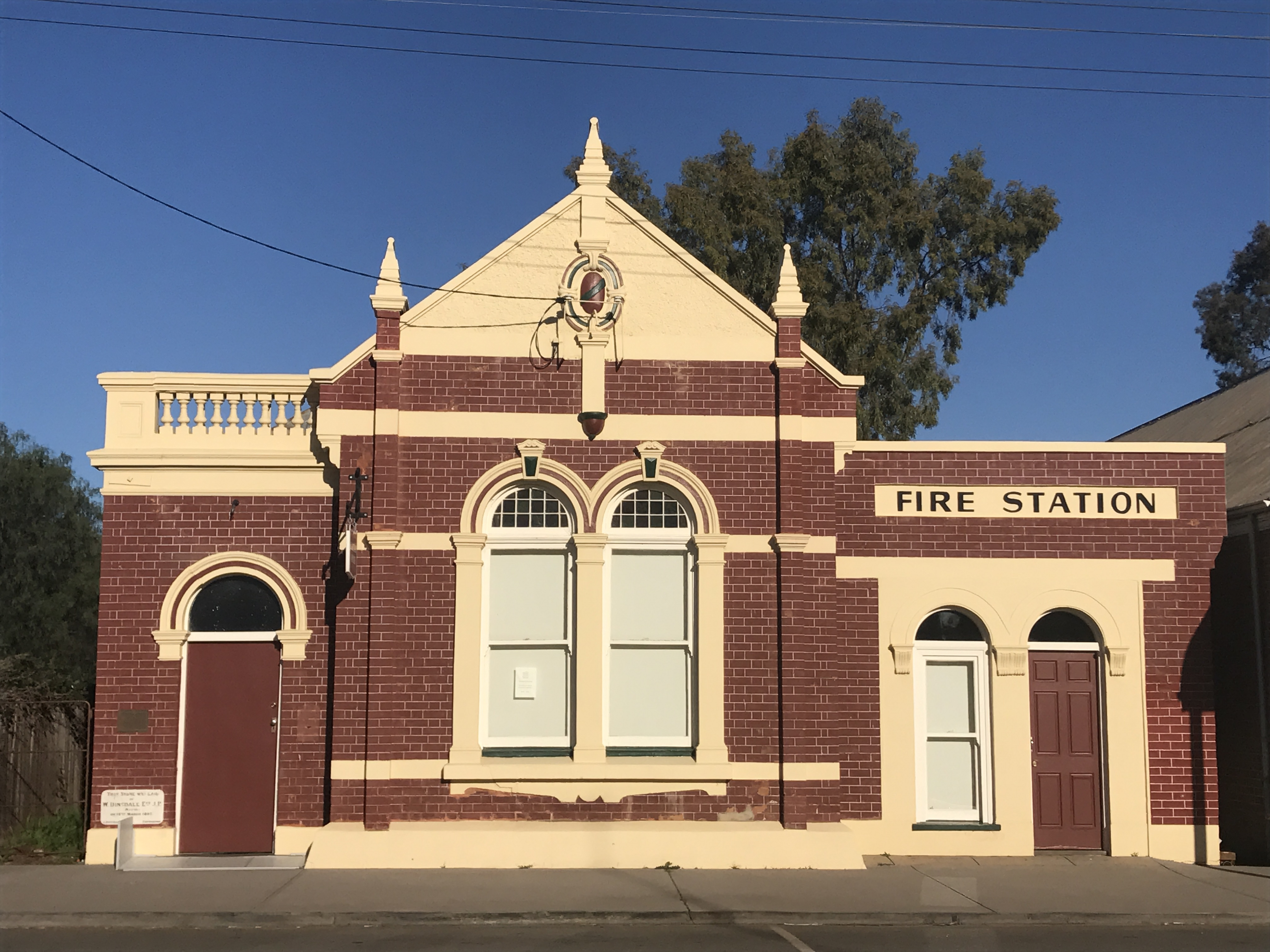
Fire Station

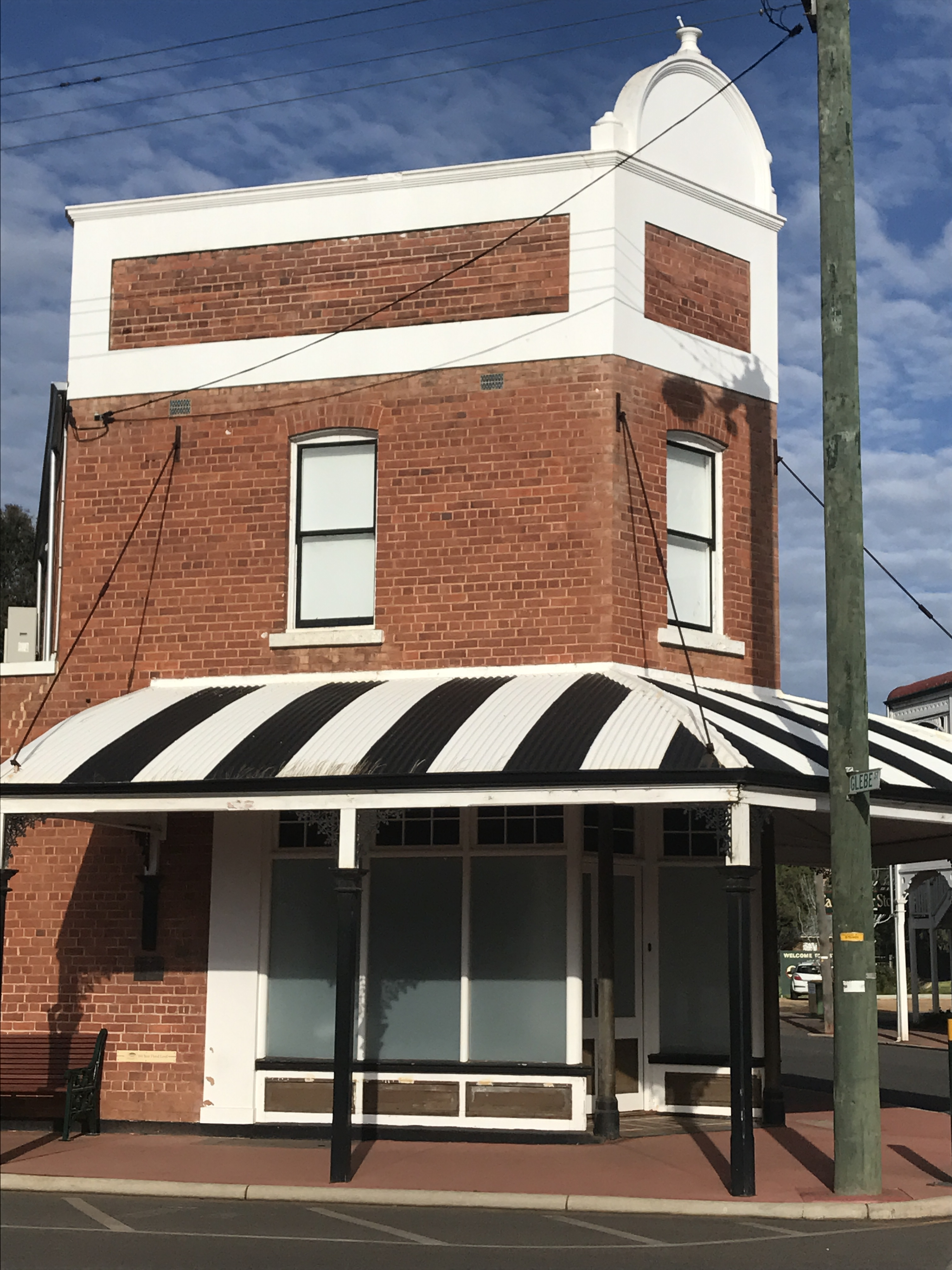
Sargent's Pharmacy

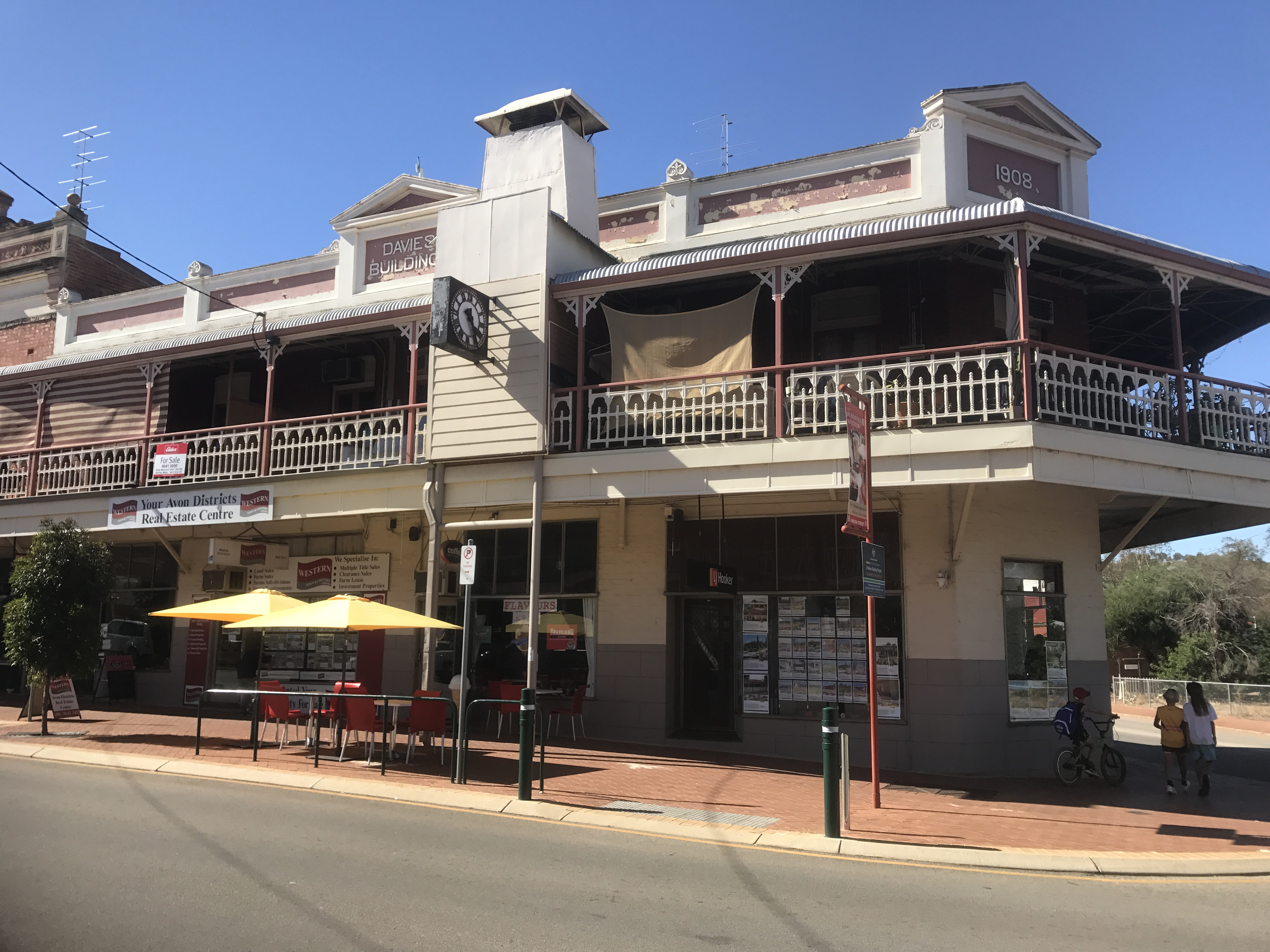
Davies Buildings

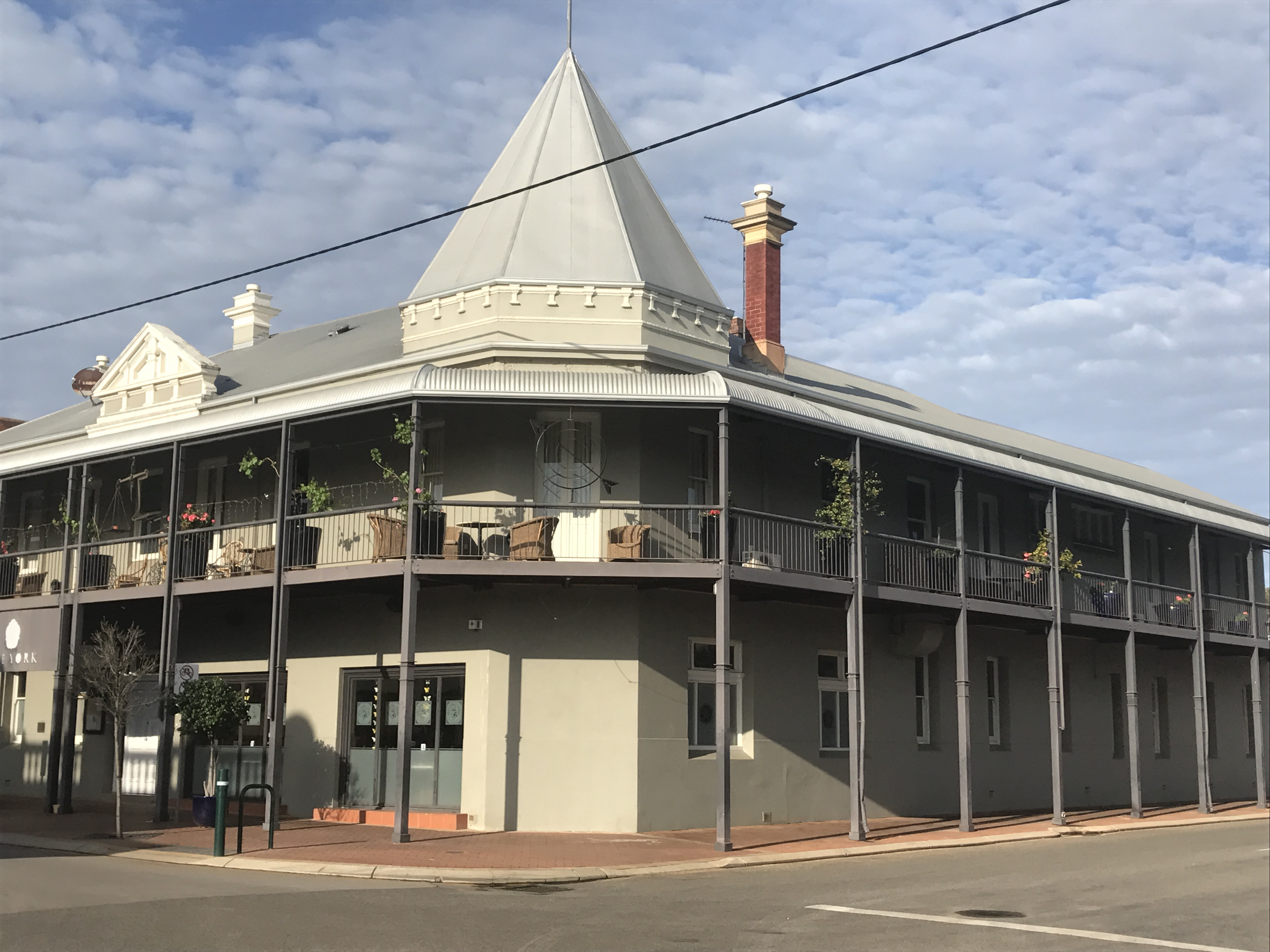
York Palace Hotel

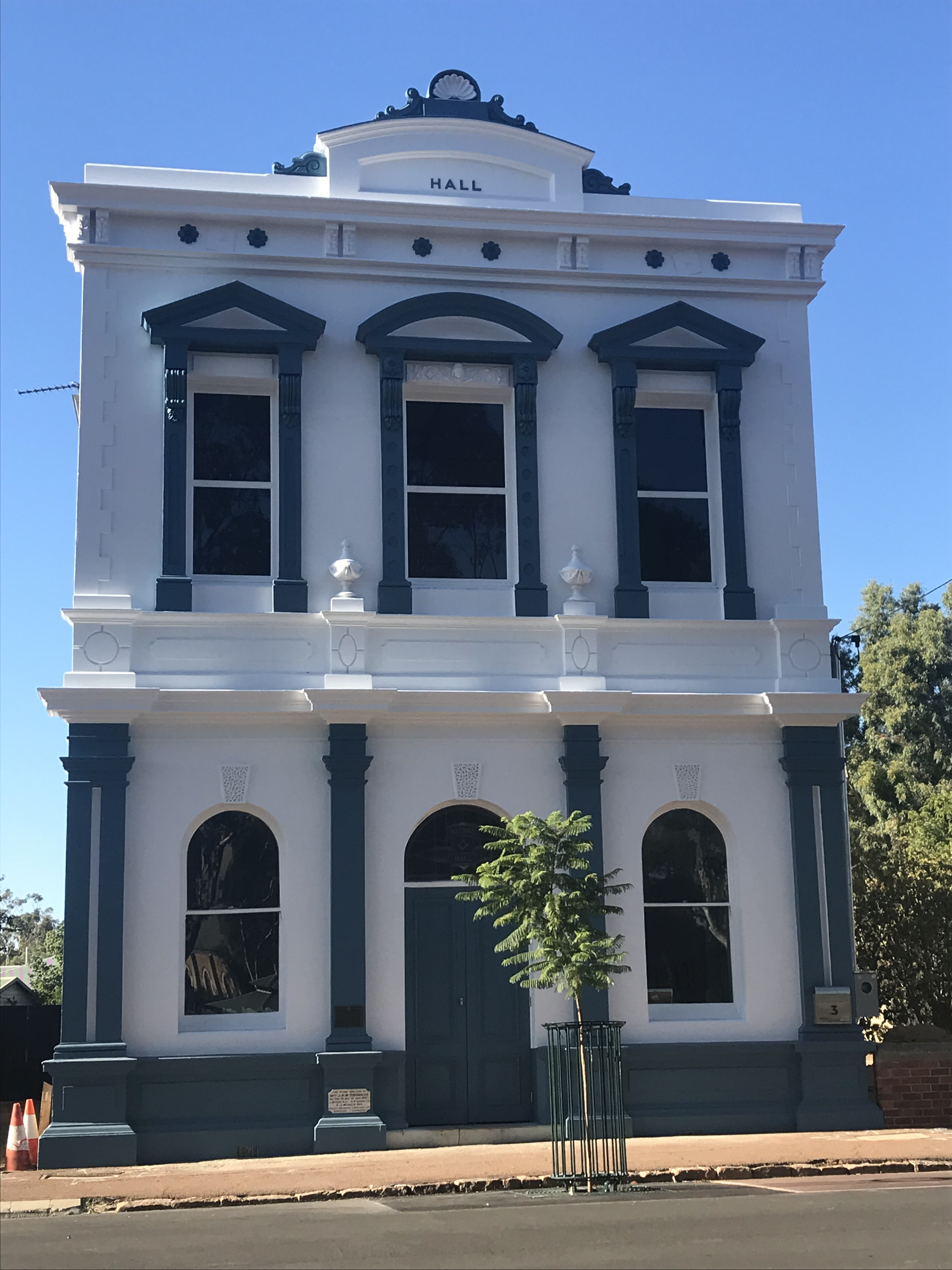
Masonic Hall

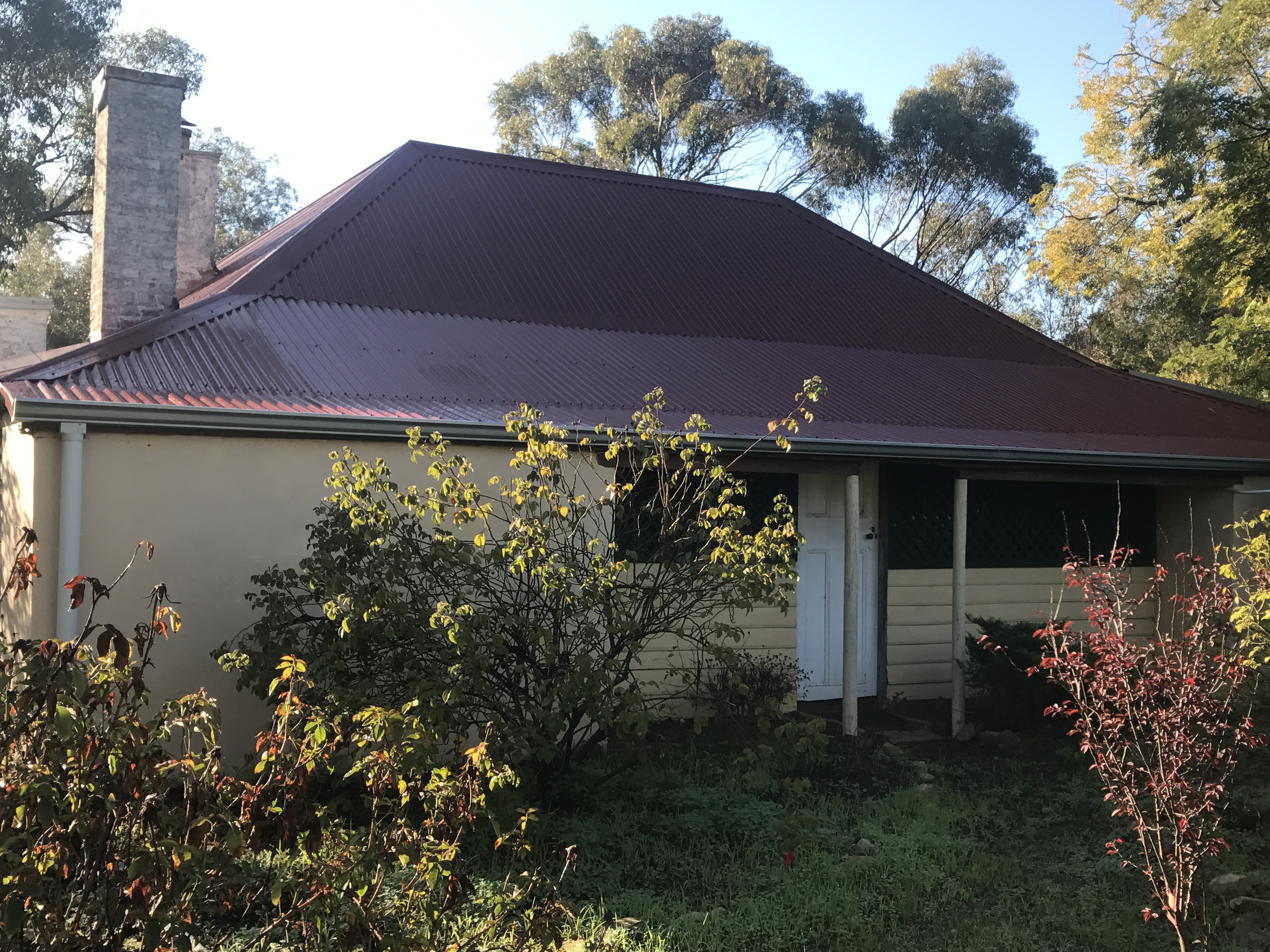
Eliza's Cottage

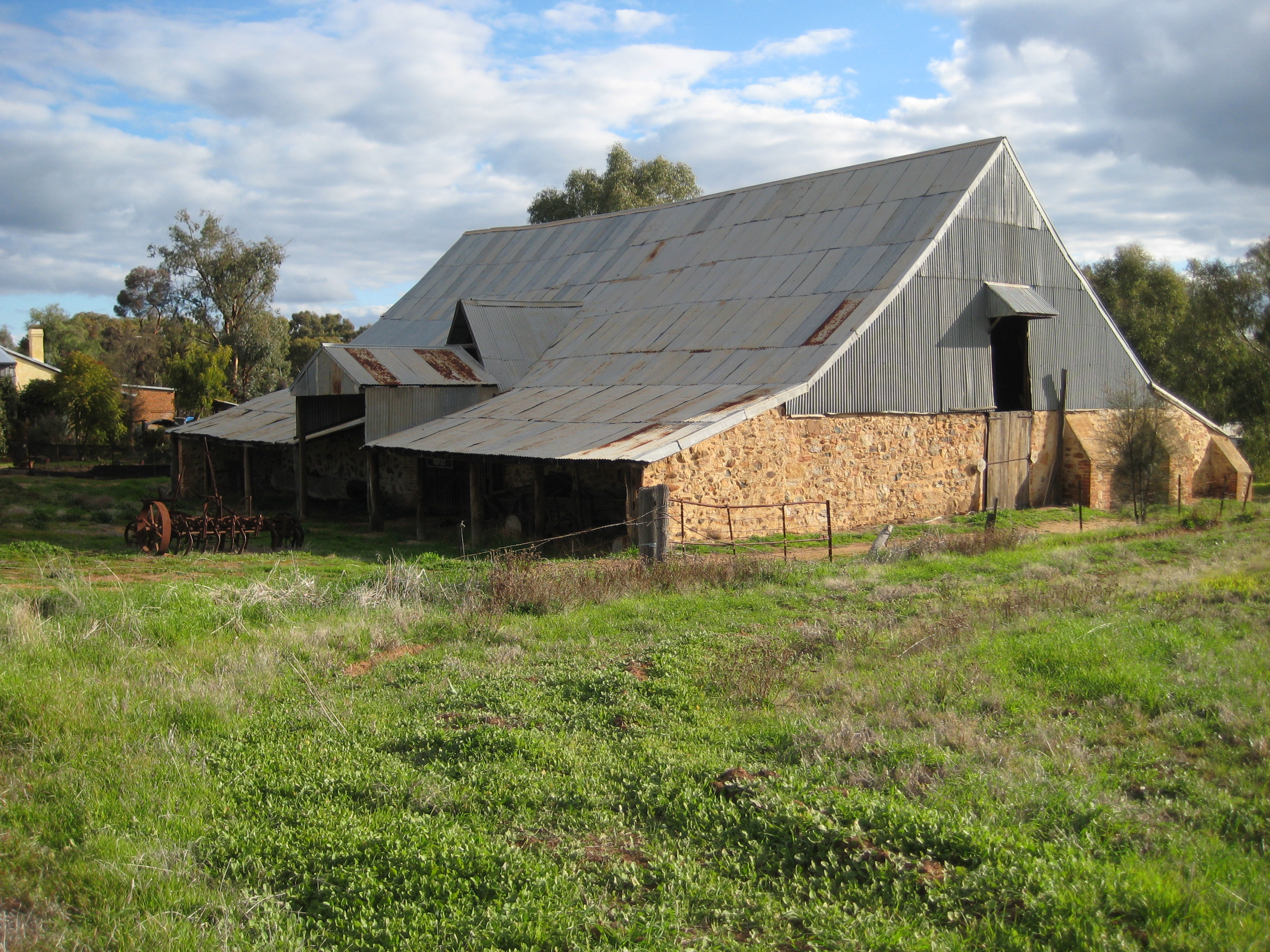
Marwick's Shed

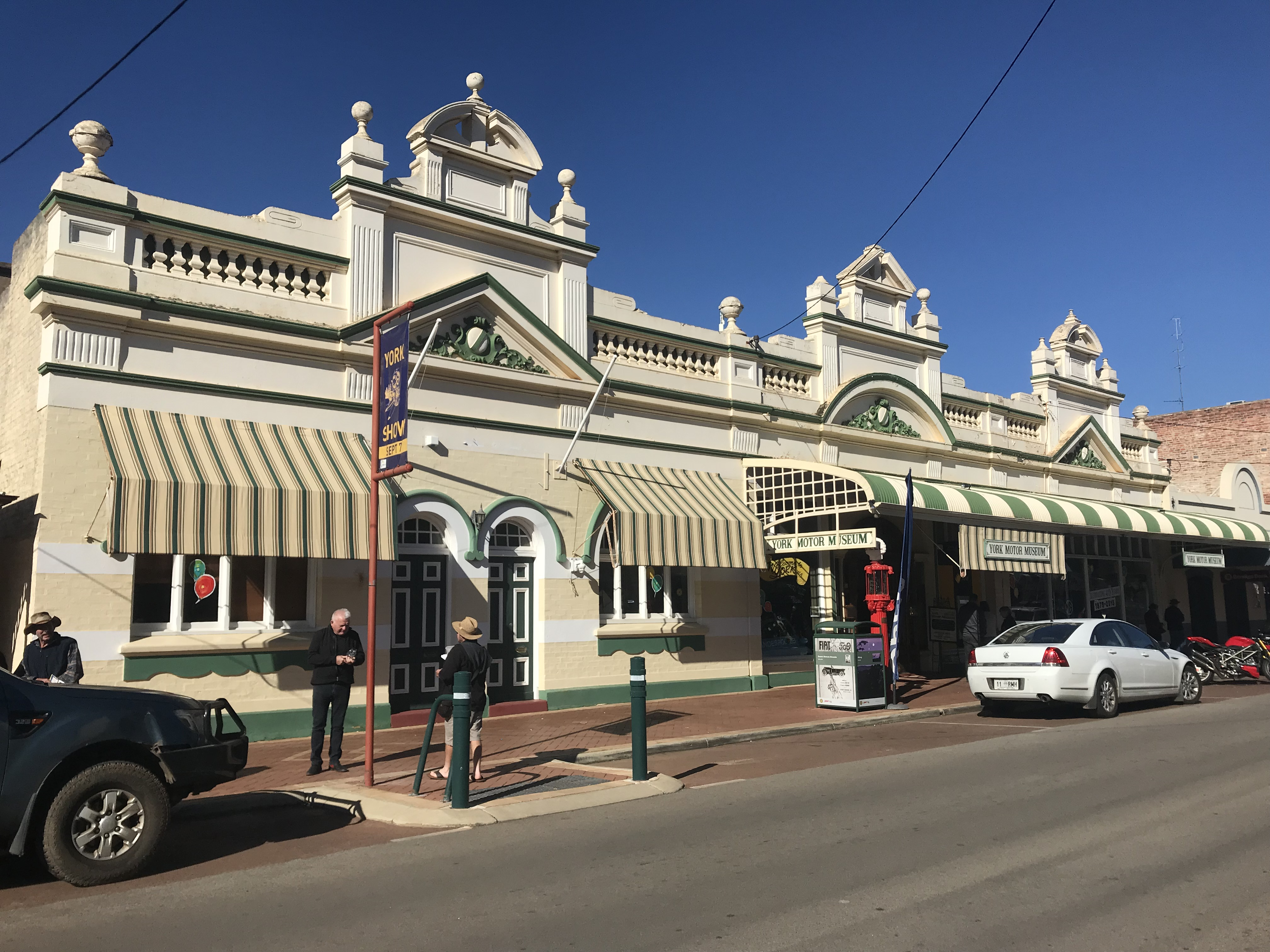
York Motor Museum

== Arts and Crafts buildings and other fine architecture ==
The Principal Architect, George Temple-Poole, was a follower of Arts and Crafts Style (Note: Arts and Crafts Style was formerly called English Cottage Style or Domestic Revival Style.) which came out of the Arts and Crafts Movement inspired by William Morris and John Ruskin. The railway station building (built in 1885), is one of the earliest Federation Arts and Crafts buildings in Australia (Note: At least one earlier home was Fairwater (Double Bay), architect John Horbury Hunt, 1882.) and could be a Cotswold cottage from Bibury in Gloucestershire, that William Morris considered the ideal in house design. The Old York Hospital has similarity to William Morris's own home, Red House and is one of the most admired Arts and Crafts buildings in the State. The former York Primary School (1886) also repeats a motif from Red House (the flèche).

Federation Free Style buildings (the commercial equivalent of Arts and Crafts style) include the York Post Office (1893), the Courthouse and police station (c. 1896). All are designed by Temple-Poole and are on the State Heritage Register.

The centre of the town has fine examples of a dozen other Victorian and Federation architectural styles, virtually uninterrupted by modern buildings. The Victorian Georgian style buildings include the old sections of Settlers House and the Castle Hotel.

The Convent School House (1872) is a Victorian Tudor building, the same style as many of Perth's early buildings and also probably designed by Richard Roach Jewell. (Note: Jewell was the architect for the Sisters of Mercy at the time.)

York churches include the Victorian Romanesque style Anglican Holy Trinity Church (completed in 1854), designed by Richard Roach Jewell; St Patrick's original church (1859–60); St Patrick's Church (designed in the Gothic Revival style by the former convict architect Joseph Nunan and completed in 1886); and the Uniting Church Chapel constructed in Victorian Georgian style (1854) and the Uniting Church in Victorian Academic Gothic style (1888).

The Catholic Presbytery is in Victorian Rustic Gothic style.

The coming of rail in 1885 brought the Victorian Filigree style Imperial Hotel (1886).

Gold rush buildings include the Federation Warehouse style York Flour Mill (1892), now a café and gallery, at the entrance to York and many of the buildings in Avon Terrace.

The Western Australian Bank building, designed by JJ Talbot Hobbs and the Masonic Hall (designed by James William Wright), are in Victorian Academic Classical style.

Most of the main street, Avon Terrace, has Victorian or Federation Free Classical buildings, including the Co-op (IGA) (1888 façade), the York Motor Museum, and Dinsdale's Shoe Emporium (1887) designed by Wright, with a cluster of Federation Romanesque buildings at the north end, including the former Fire Station (1897).

Early 20th century buildings include the stunning Federation Mannerist (or Edwardian Opulence) style Town Hall (also designed by Wright, and built in 1911), and an exemplar of Federation Filigree style, the Castle Hotel (1905), designed by William G Wolf, who designed His Majesty's Theatre. (Note: This section summarises information set out in detail in the individual buildings discussed.)

Gallery of some buildings in York of architectural interest

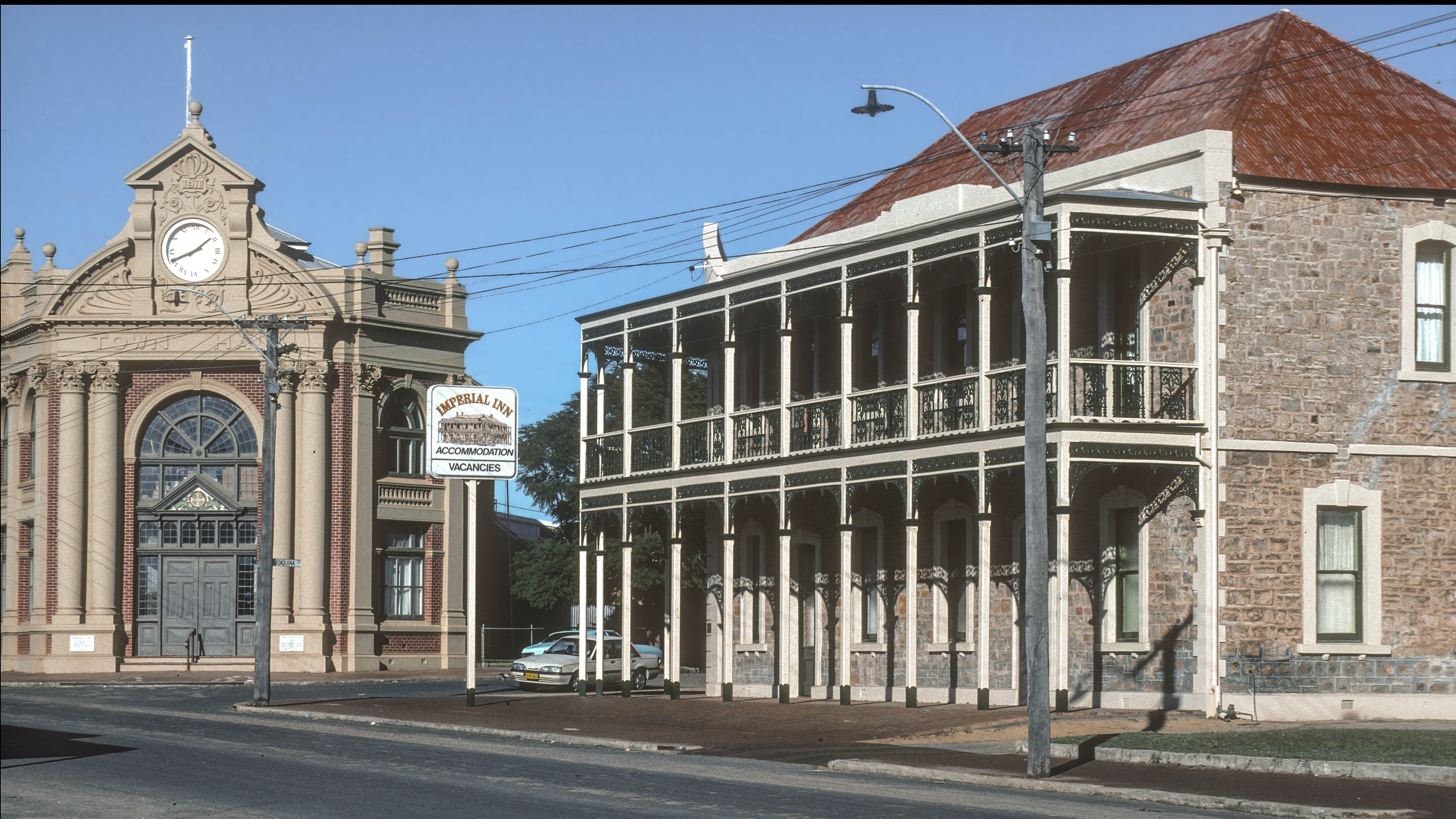
Town Hall and Imperial Hotel

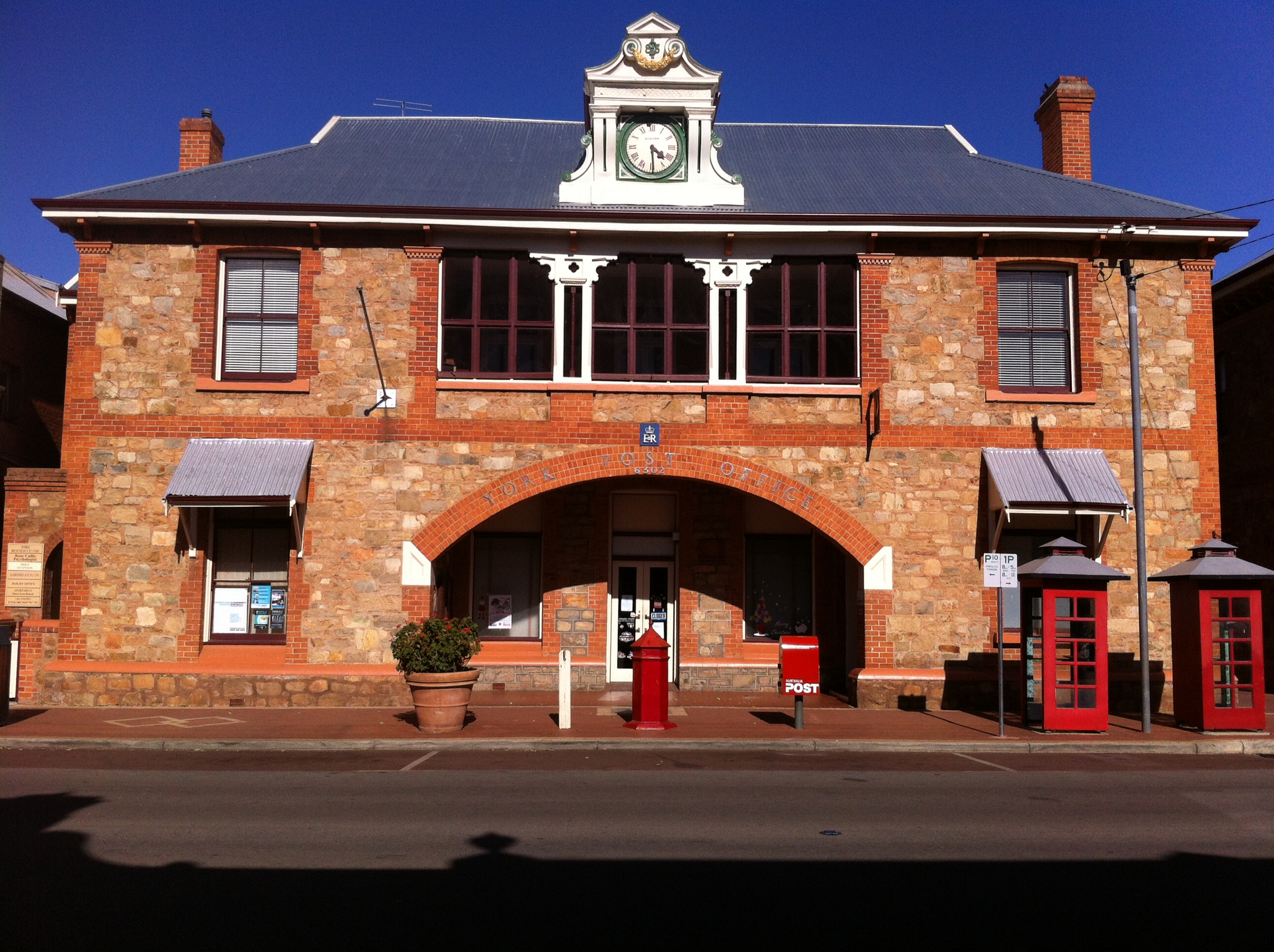
York Post Office

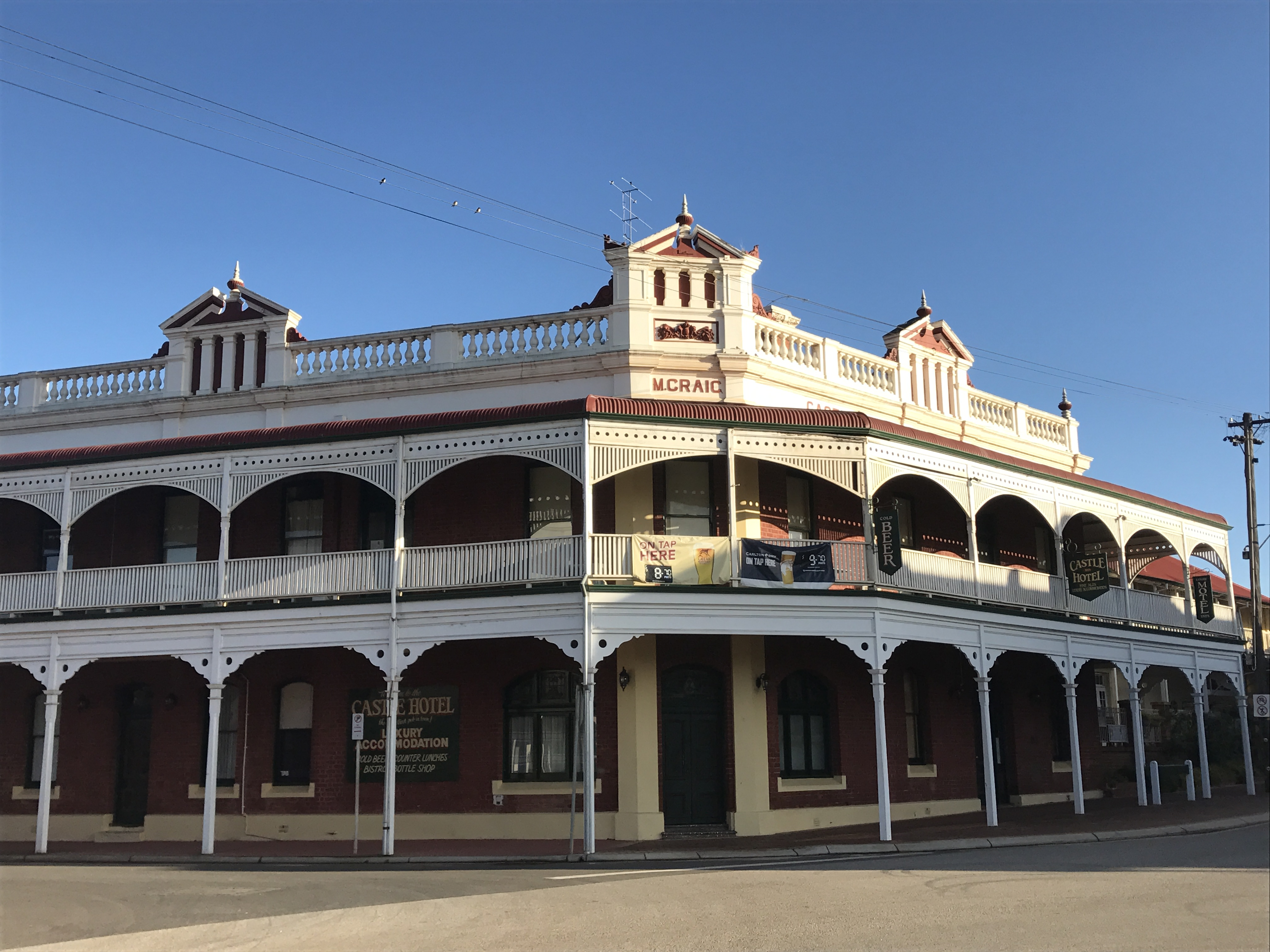
Castle Hotel

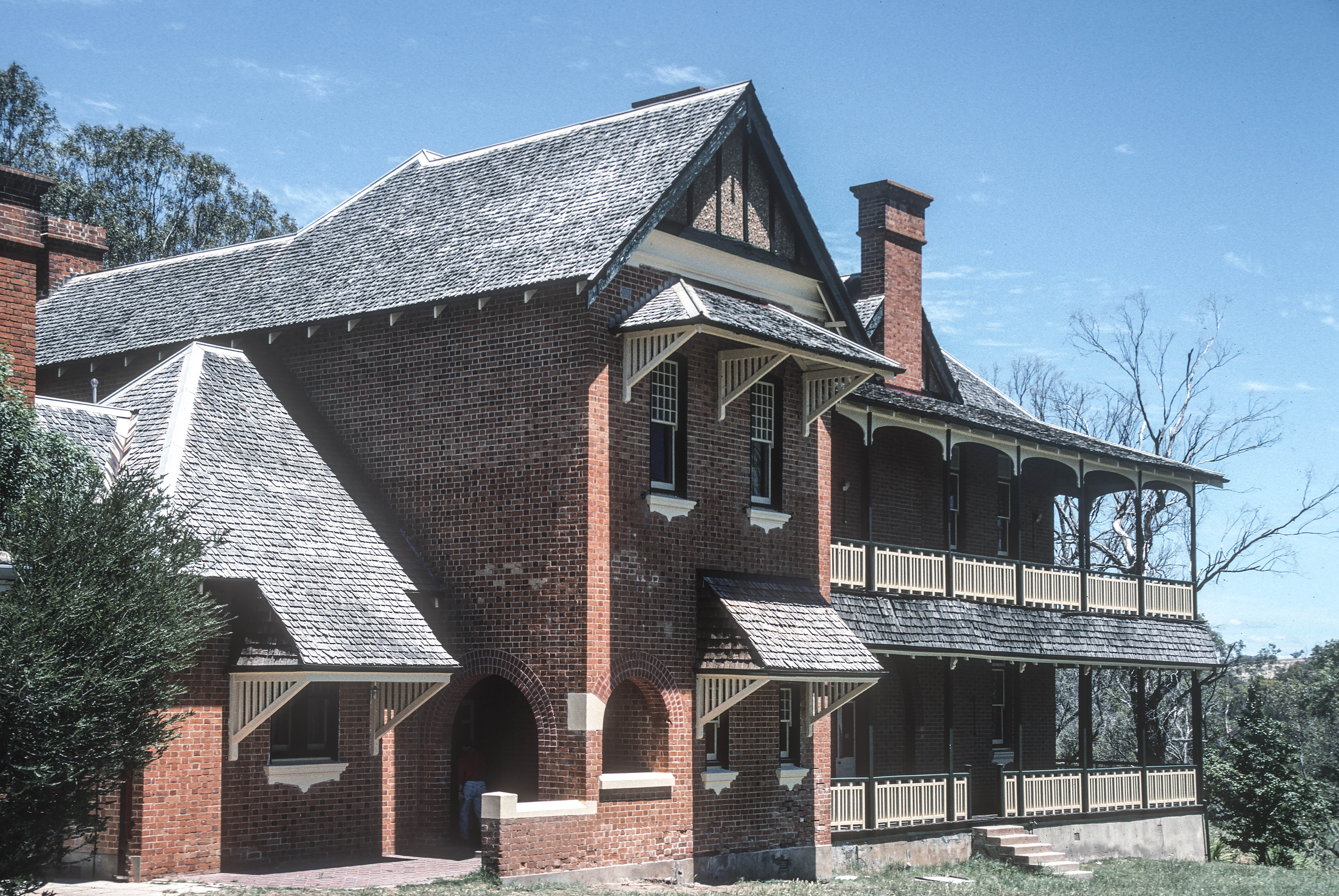
Old York Hospital

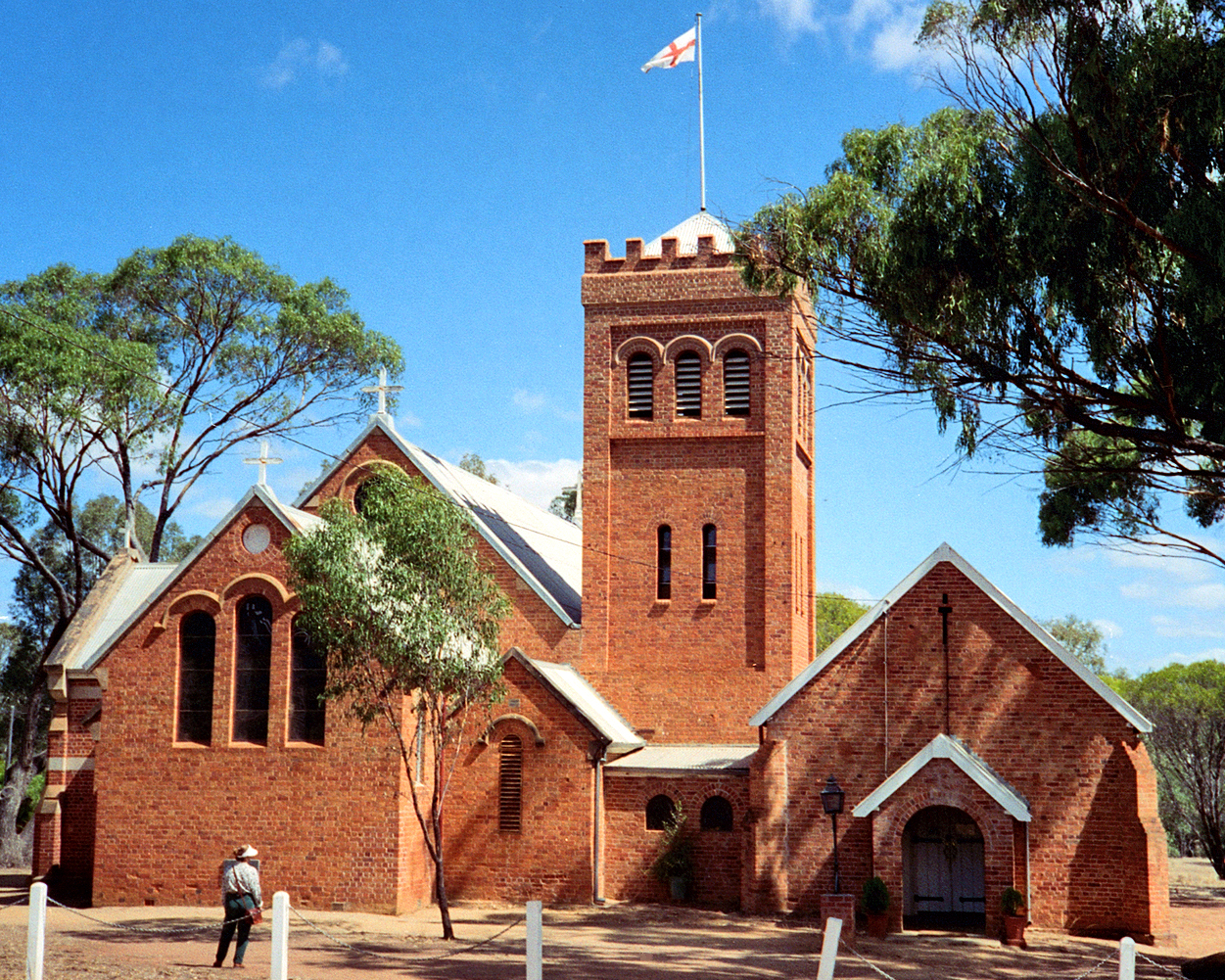
Holy Trinity Church

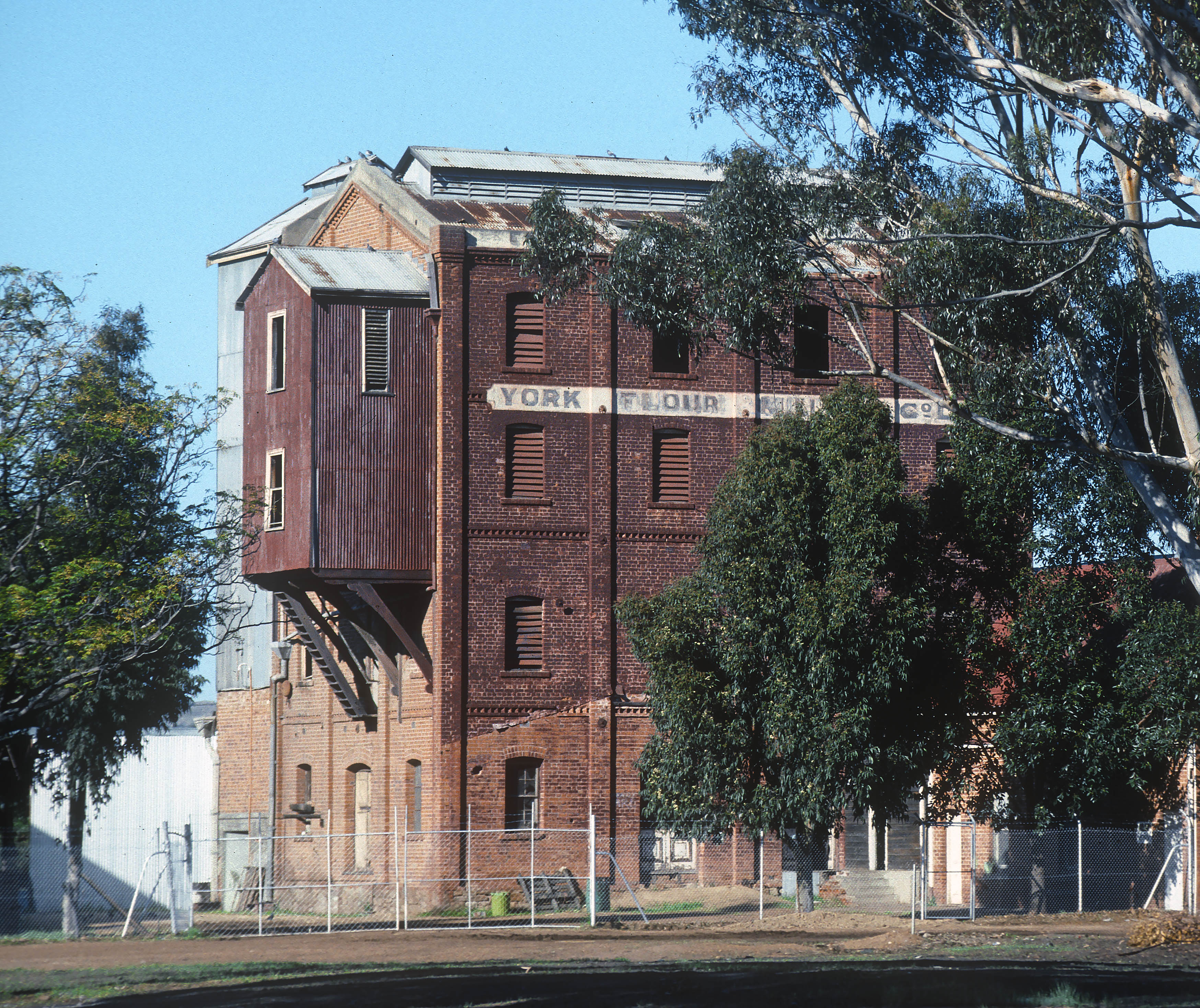
York Flour Mill

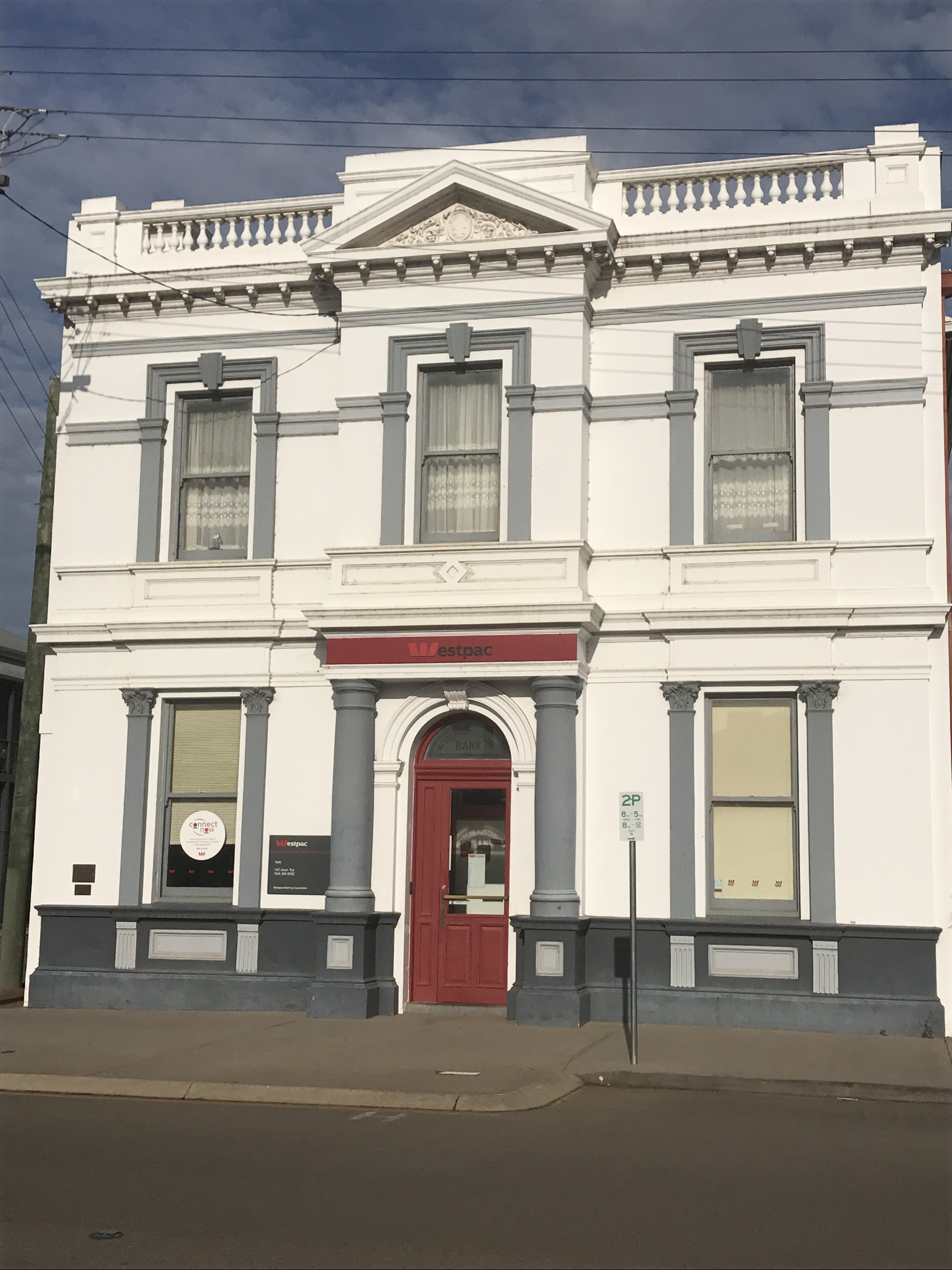
Western Australian Bank

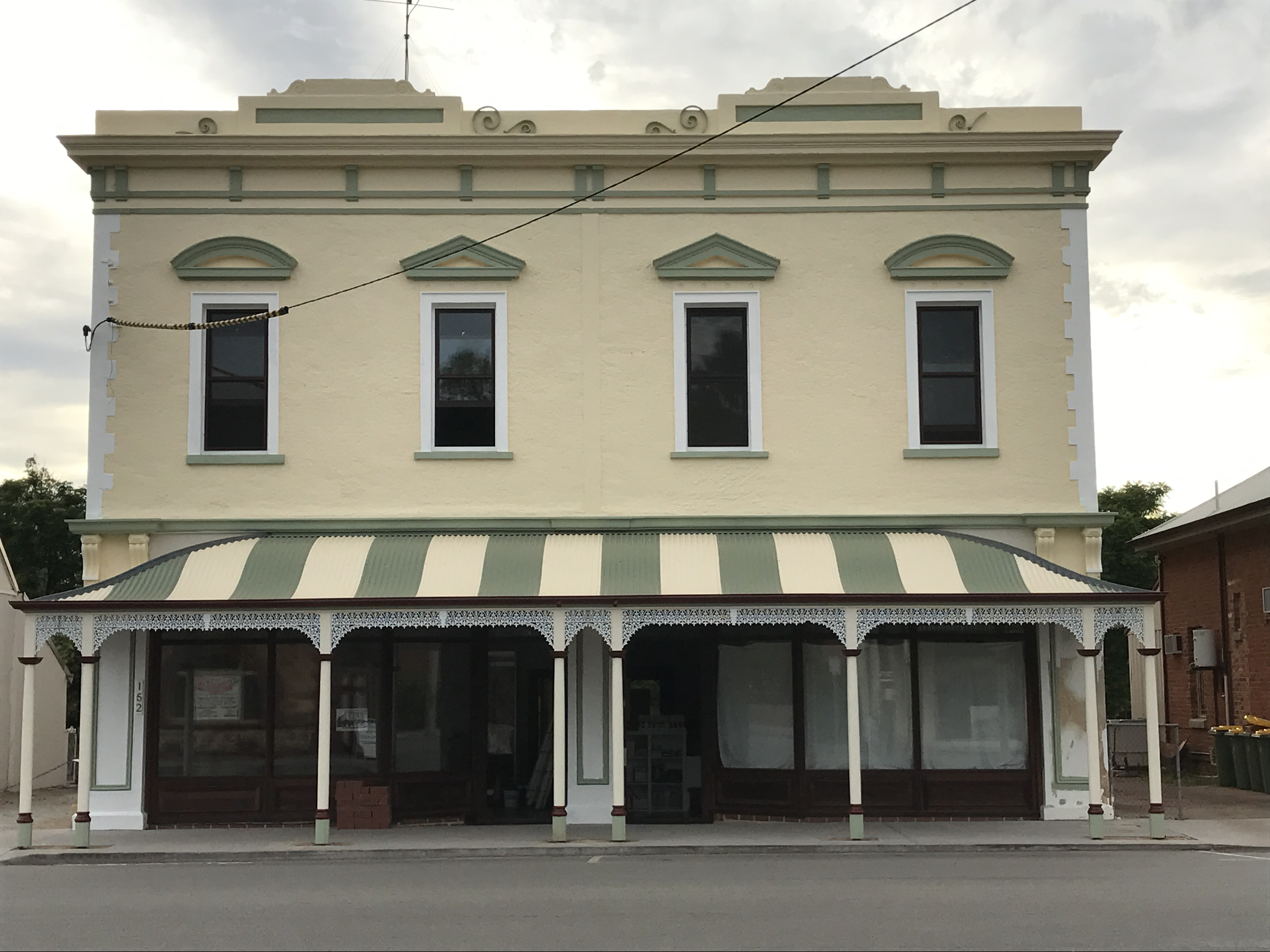
Dinsdale's Shoe Emporium

== List of notable buildings ==
- Castle Hotel
- Central Buildings
- Courthouse
- Convent and convent school
- Davies Buildings
- Dinsdale's Shoe Emporium
- Edwards' Store (former)
- Eliza's Cottage
- Faversham House
- Fire Station (former)
- Flour Mill
- Holy Trinity Church
- Hope Farm
- Hospital (Former)
- Imperial Hotel
- Kairey Cottage
- Kings Head Hotel (former)
- Marwick's Shed
- Masonic Hall (former)
- Mongers Store
- Motor Museum
- Nineteen Mile Inn (former)
- Post office
- School (Former)
- Railway station building
- Residency Museum
- Sargent's pharmacy
- St Patrick's Church
- Settlers House
- Suspension Bridge
- Town Hall
- Uniting Church
- Western Australian Bank (former)
- York Palace Hotel

== List of notable people ==
- Peter Barrow (1813–1899) — magistrate and Guardian of Aborigines, priest and school teacher
- Chance Bateman — former AFL player for the Hawthorn Football Club
- Enid Bennett (1893–1969) — silent film actress
- Marjorie Bennett (1896–1982) — Australian–born television and film actress
- Revett Henry Bland (1811–1894) — early settler and first resident magistrate in York
- William Locke Brockman (1802–1872) — early settler, pastoralist and stock breeder; Member of the Western Australian Legislative Council
- Eliza Brown (1811–1896) — wife of Thomas Brown; letters to her father were published by Peter Cwan
- Thomas Brown (1803–1862) — early York settler and farmer, Member of the Western Australian Legislative Council
- Henry William St Pierre Bunbury (1812–1875) —Lieutenant of 21st Regiment, stationed in York in 1836, military post in Bunbury was named after him
- Lockier Burges (1814–1886) — early settler
- Thomas Burges (1830–1893) — pastoralist and politician, member of the Legislative Council of Western Australia
- William Burges (1806 or 1808–1876) — secretary of the York Agricultural Society, was closely involved in the petition for Western Australia to become a penal colony
- Solomon Cook (1812–1871) — American engineer
- James Cowan (1848–1937) — York Clerk of Courts and Postmaster, registrar and Master of the Supreme Court; husband of Edith Cowan
- Walkinshaw Cowan (1808–1888) — protector of natives at York, police magistrate, resident magistrate of York and Beverley
- William Cowan (1854–1940) — resident magistrate
- Cowits (c.1832–1868) — first Aboriginal assistant at the York Police Station
- Les Craig CMG (1892–1966) — politician, member of the Legislative Council of Western Australia
- Samuel Smale Craig (1802–1869) — built and operated the Castle Hotel
- Robert Dale (1810–1853) — explorer; discoveredAvon Valley, explored the future locations of Northam, Toodyay and York
- Aimable Duperouzel (1831–1901) — french–born convict, successful farmer and land owner
- John Drummond (1816–1906) — early settler, first Inspector of Native Police
- Zac Fisher (1998–) — AFL player for the Carlton Football Club
- Eric William Gillett (1899–1987) — mayor of the Municipality of Claremont, chancellor of the University of Western Australia
- Louis Giustiniani — Italian missionary who came to Western Australia in 1836 to establish a Moravian style mission; visited York
- David Gault — former Australian rules footballer,South Fremantle Football Club
- Ron Gaunt (1934–2012) — Australian cricketer
- Edward Hamersley (senior) (1810–1874) — early settler and landholder
- Edward Hamersley (junior) (1835–1927) — son of Edward Hamersley (senior), elected to the Legislative Council seat of York
- Nicholas Hasluck — retired judge and poet
- Paul Hasluck KG GCMG GCVO (1905–1993) — politician and Governor–General of Australia; lived in York for a while when young
- Edmund Henderson (1821–1896) — Comptroller–General of Convicts in Western Australia
- Sir William Heseltine — Private Secretary to Sir Robert Menzies, Prime Minister, Private Secretary to the Sovereign, Keeper of the Queen's Archives; lived at York for a while during retirement
- James William Hope (1851–1918) — Resident Medical Officer for the York District, medical officer at Fremantle Prison, superintendent of the Fremantle Lunatic Asylum, Commissioner of Health
- Richard Roach Jewell (1810–1891) —architect
- Moondyne Joe (c 1826–1900) — criminal convict and Western Australia's best–known bushranger
- Robert Juniper — artist and designer; notable work includes the stained glass windows of Holy Trinity Church, York
- King Dick — an Aboriginal guide
- Billy "Noongale" Kickett (1853–1905) — Aboriginal who (with Tommy Windich) accompanied John Forrest and Alexander Forrest on their expedition across the Great Australian Bight to Adelaide in mid 1870
- Edward Wilson Landor (1816–1878) — early settler; lawyer, scholar, and writer
- Henry Landor (1816–1877) — settler, physician, scientist, explorer and farmer; medical superintendent of the Asylum for the Insane, London, Ontario, advocate of moral treatment of mental patients
- Henry Maxwell Lefroy (1818–1879) — early settler in York, prominent explorer of the Mid West and Goldfields–Esperance regions
- Dominic McCarthy (1892–1975) — Australian recipient of the Victoria Cross
- Thomas Marwick (1895–1960) — politician and the first West Australian to have served in both houses of federal parliament
- Warren Marwick (1896–1955) — farmer and politician in the Western Australian Legislative Council
- William Marwick (1833–1925) — pioneer settler, successful merchant, operated goldfields
- Reg Mattiske (1912–1992) — politician and member of the Western Australian Legislative Council, representing Metropolitan Province
- Richard Goldsmith Meares (1780–1862) — second resident magistrate of York and Beverley
- Janet Millett (1821–1904) née Webster — wife of York Anglican priest Rev Edward Millett, and author of An Australian Parsonage (published 1872)
- Jimmy Melbourne (c.1876–1937) — Indigenous Australian, senior Australian rules football player
- Frederick Monger (1863–1919) — businessman and politician, member of the Legislative Assembly of Western Australia representing the seat of York; son of John Henry Monger
- John Henry Monger Snr (1802–1867) — early settler, opened first hotel and store in York, prominent land owner, built the first two stages of Faversham House
- John Henry Monger Jr (1831–1892) — Member of the Western Australian Legislative Council
- George Fletcher Moore (1798–1856) — early settler and explorer of the Avon River
- Joseph Nunan (1854–1917) — Fenian convict, architect of St Patrick's Church in York
- Walter Padbury (1817–1907) — merchant and philanthropist
- Stephen Stanley Parker (1817–1904) — early settler and politician
- Stephen Henry Parker (1846–1927) — Chief Justice of Western Australia
- Marlion Pickett — Australian rules footballer, Richmond Football Club in the Australian Football League (AFL)
- Christopher Pullin — former judge
- Joseph Pyke (1831–1910) — pioneer settler in York
- Hugh Roche (1893–1962) — politician, Country Party member of the Legislative Council of Western Australia
- Herbie Screaigh (1911–2002) — Australian rules footballer, East Perth Football Club in the Western Australian National Football League (WANFL)
- John Smithies (1802–1872) — Wesleyan minister who tried to establish the Gerald Mission in York
- John Taylor (1821–1890) — pioneer settler
- Lindsay Thorn (1891–1971) — Country Party member of the Legislative Assembly of Western Australia, representing the seat of Toodyay, minister in the government of Sir Ross McLarty
- Arthur Trimmer (1805–1877) — pioneer settler, one of the first to breed merino sheep
- Arthur Wansbrough (1877–1949) — trade unionist, Labor Party member of the Legislative Assembly of Western Australia, representing the seat of Albany
- Tommy Windich (c1840–c1876) — Indigenous member of exploring expeditions in Western Australia
- Frank Wittenoom (1855–1939) — explorer and pastoralist
- John Burdett Wittenoom (1788–1855) — early settler and land owner
- Garnet Wood (1888–1952) — Country Party member of the Legislative Council of Western Australia, minister in the government of Ross McLarty

== Facilities ==
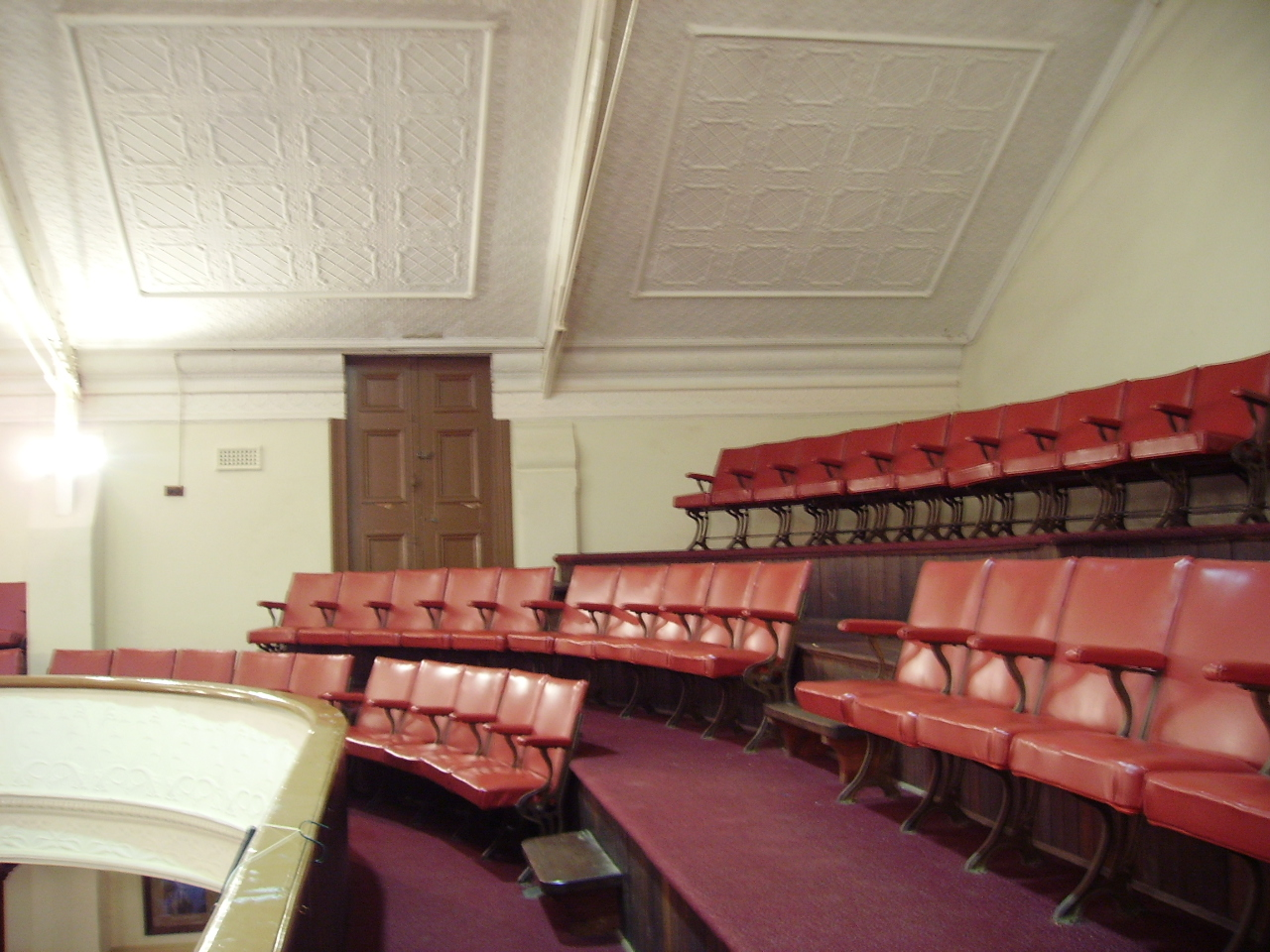
Inside York Town Hall

The York Visitor Centre is located in the Town Hall.

York is well serviced with all essential facilities, including York District High School for students from kindergarten to Year 10. The York Community Resource Centre enables access to tertiary education. There is a 24/7 medical service, the York District Hospital, library, and swimming pool.

York has had a community radio station, Voice of the Avon 101.3FM, since 1994. Beginning life as York FM in the old convent the current location is at the corner of Barker and Forrest streets. The volunteer-driven station presents a 24/7 music service with presenters providing their own programs for 82 hours per week between 6 am and 10 pm.

== Climate ==
York is in a temperate climate zone and experiences distinctly dry (and hot) summers and cool, wet winters. Under the Köppen climate classification, York has a Mediterranean climate. York has hotter summer afternoons than Perth, with a huge difference compared to the Fremantle shoreline. Winters are more likely to see cold nights instead due to the lower maritime influence. Air frost during the night can emerge on certain occasions during the colder months.

Climate data has been recorded by the Bureau of Meteorology at York Post Office from 1877 to 1996, and another site from 1996 onwards.

At the post office site, the mean annual daily maximum temperature is 24.7 °C (76.5 °F) and the mean annual daily minimum temperature is 10.5 °C (50.9 °F). The hottest month is January with a mean maximum temperature of 33.6 °C (92.5 °F), while the coolest month is July with a mean minimum temperature of 5.3 °C (41.5 °F). Mean temperatures are based on data from 1880 to 1996. York has a mean annual rainfall of 449.8 millimetres (17.71 in). The wettest month is June with 87.9 millimetres (3.46 in) and the driest is January with 9.5 millimetres (0.37 in).

A severe thunderstorm lashed the town and surrounding areas on 27 January 2011, resulting in roofs being ripped off, trees being uprooted and power lines being brought down. About 40 houses were damaged in the town as a result of the storm but no injuries were reported.

Climate data for York and York Post Office (averages: 1880–1996; extremes: 1934–present)
Month	Jan	Feb	Mar	Apr	May	Jun	Jul	Aug	Sep	Oct	Nov	Dec	Year
Record high °C (°F)	46.6 (115.9)	47.4 (117.3)	43.4 (110.1)	39.0 (102.2)	34.4 (93.9)	25.7 (78.3)	25.4 (77.7)	30.0 (86.0)	35.0 (95.0)	40.0 (104.0)	43.0 (109.4)	45.5 (113.9)	47.4 (117.3)
Mean daily maximum °C (°F)	33.6 (92.5)	32.9 (91.2)	30.0 (86.0)	25.5 (77.9)	20.6 (69.1)	17.4 (63.3)	16.4 (61.5)	17.5 (63.5)	20.1 (68.2)	23.4 (74.1)	27.9 (82.2)	31.5 (88.7)	24.7 (76.5)
Mean daily minimum °C (°F)	16.6 (61.9)	16.7 (62.1)	14.8 (58.6)	11.3 (52.3)	8.0 (46.4)	6.4 (43.5)	5.3 (41.5)	5.4 (41.7)	6.5 (43.7)	8.4 (47.1)	12.0 (53.6)	14.9 (58.8)	10.5 (50.9)
Record low °C (°F)	7.0 (44.6)	6.5 (43.7)	3.2 (37.8)	0.6 (33.1)	−3.2 (26.2)	−4.0 (24.8)	−5.2 (22.6)	−3.0 (26.6)	−2.2 (28.0)	−1.2 (29.8)	0.4 (32.7)	2.7 (36.9)	−5.2 (22.6)
Average rainfall mm (inches)	9.5 (0.37)	14.6 (0.57)	16.8 (0.66)	24.1 (0.95)	60.5 (2.38)	87.9 (3.46)	85.5 (3.37)	65.9 (2.59)	37.4 (1.47)	25.5 (1.00)	12.6 (0.50)	10.1 (0.40)	450.4 (17.72)
Average rainy days (≥ 0.2mm)	1.4	2.2	2.7	5.8	9.9	14.6	15.3	13.1	10.0	6.4	4.2	2.1	87.7
Source: Bureau of Meteorology

== Sources ==
- Bunbury, Henry William St Pierre; Morrell, William Parker, eds. (1930). Early days in Western Australia: Being the letters and journal of Lieut. H.W. Bunbury, 21st fusiliers (PDF). London: Oxford University Press. OCLC 221171847. Wikidata Q136431240.
- Clack, Anthony M. (2003). York Sketchbook. Illustrated by Jenni McColl. York, Western Australia: York Society. ISBN 0959650245. OCLC 223680470.
- Cross, Joseph, ed. (1833). Journals of Several Expeditions Made in Western Australia, during the years 1829, 1830, 1831, and 1832; under the Sanction of the Governor, Sir James Stirling, Containing the Latest Authentic Information Relative to That Country, Accompanied by a Map (PDF). Holborn: Joseph Cross. Wikidata Q19113848.
  - Dale, Robert (1833a). "Journal of an Expedition under the direction of Ensign Dale, to the Eastward of the Darling Mountains, in August, 1831". In Cross (1833), pp. 51–61.
  - Dale, Robert (1833b). "Letters from Mr. Dale, giving a summary description of the country passed over in going to Mount Bakewell, and, also, in an Expedition to examine the Country to the North and South of that place". In Cross (1833), pp. 155–160.
- Deacon, John E. (1948). A Survey of the Historical Development of the Avon Valley with Particular Reference to York, Western Australia During the Years 1830–1850. Claremont Teachers College. Wikidata Q136431176.
- Duperouzel, William Thomas (15 June 2019). Sunset Over Mount Douraking. William Thomas Duperouzel. ISBN 978-0-9544314-2-6.
- Erickson, Rica, ed. (1979). Dictionary of Western Australians. Nedlands: UWA Publishing. OCLC 757766995. Wikidata Q5273978.
- Kimberly, Warren Bert, ed. (1897). History of West Australia: A Narrative of her Past together with Biographies of her Leading Men. Melbourne: F. W. Niven. OCLC 36942961. Wikidata Q5867187.
