= Suspension Bridge, York =

Footbridge in York, Western Australia

Coordinates: 31°53′13″S 116°46′15″E

Designations

Western Australia Heritage Register
- Type: Shire of York heritage list
- Designated: 31 December 1995
- Reference no.: 2889

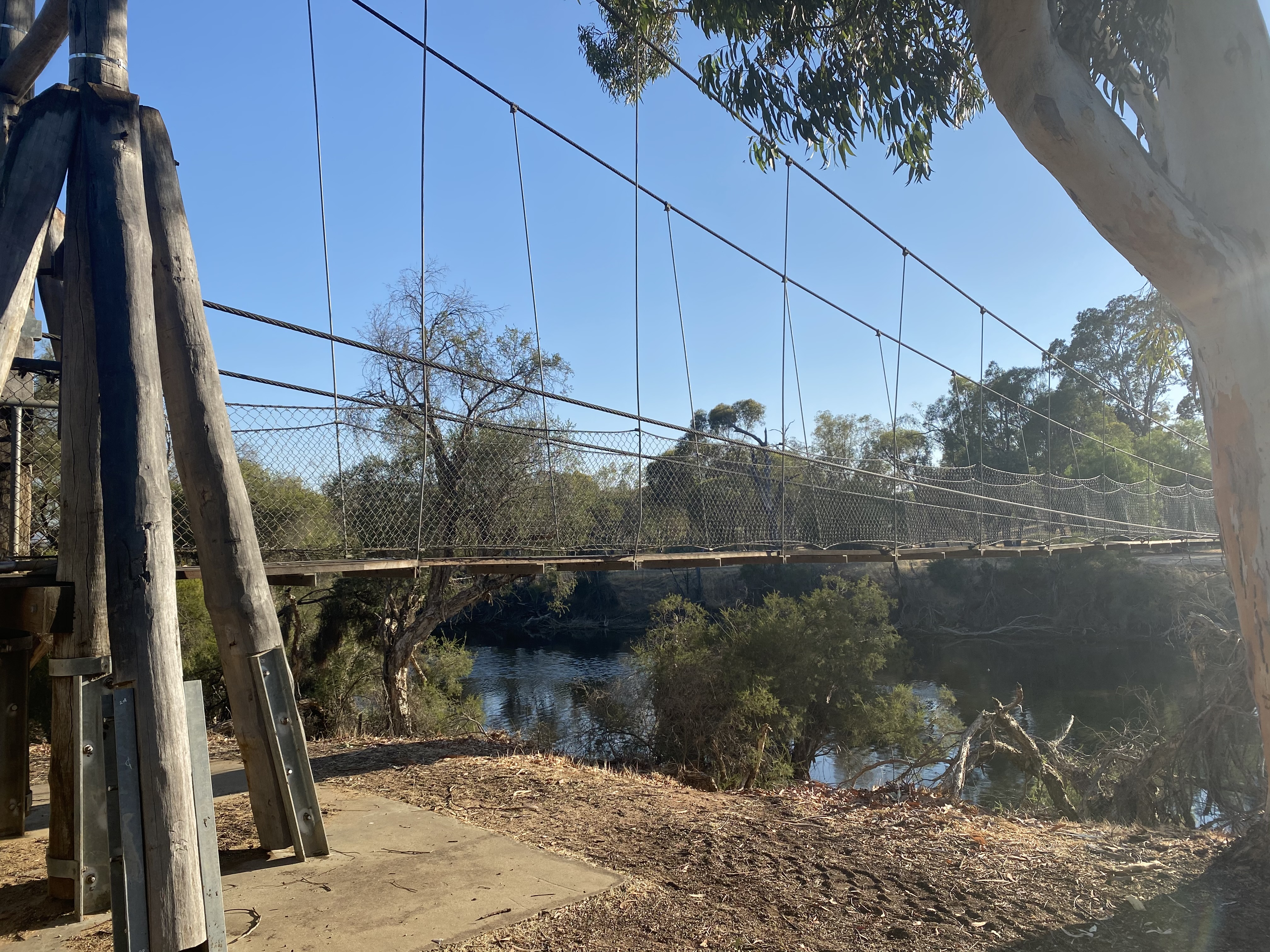
Suspension Bridge, York

The Suspension Bridge is a suspension foot bridge with steel cables and timber decking spanning the Avon River between Lowe Street and Pool Street, York, Western Australia, linking the commercial centre of the town with the Holy Trinity Church.

== First bridge ==
After being petitioned by 25 residents of the east bank, the York Municipal Council resolved to construct a foot bridge across the Avon River at the centre of town and tenders were called on 14 April 1888.

The first bridge was designed by Henry E Parry, engineer and York / Beverley superintendent for the Great Southern Railway. James Butterly won the tender to construct the bridge for a fee of £75. Construction was under way in August 1888.

The bridge was opened on 24 October 1888 by the Governor Sir Frederick Broome, who also was attending a luncheon for the York Agricultural Society Show Day which was held on the grounds adjacent to the bridge. "His Excellency having declared the bridge opened walked across it followed by several influential gentlemen. The party then proceeded to the Castle Hotel and partook of a little champagne in honour of the occasion". The bridge was the first such bridge built in Western Australia.

The bridge crossed the river from behind the Police Station on the west side.

The original bridge was paid for partly by the York Municipal Council and partly by contributions from townspeople.

Since at least 1890, the suspension bridge has also been called the Swing Bridge, though it is technically a suspension bridge and not a swing bridge.

After the bridge started to be used, there were complaints of vandalism. A stile to the Anglican Church was thrown into the river and a gate to the Anglican Rectory was broken. The council also concerned itself with reports of damage to the foot-walk by bicycles or "perambulators".

A flood in 1891 saw the river flowing a metre above the foot-walk, but the bridge survived. The bridge was flooded again in 1893. The bridge was widened and repaired in 1894.

== Relocation to Pool St ==
When the first wire suspension bridge was originally constructed, it was the only bridge across the river adjacent to the centre of the town. 800 metres to the north was Monger's bridge across Monger's Ford which had been repaired in 1885, and the nearest bridge to the South was Parker's Bridge joining Redmile Road with Brook Street which was often in disrepair.

In 1896, a traffic bridge was constructed between South Street and Glebe St. The York Municipal Council resolved to move the suspension bridge 200 metres north to be adjacent to Pool St, notwithstanding that the new site meant that the bridge had to be 20 feet (7 metres) longer. The lowest tender to move the bridge was from Davis & Flight, being £49/15/6.

This work started in December 1896 and was completed by the end of January 1897.

The relocated suspension bridge was reported as being "very much availed of".

== Bathing issues and a horse ==
In 1897 there were complaints about bathers near the suspension bridge paying "no attention to bathing costume". In 1905, the Council bylaws required "that boys and men must wear bathing pants. This rule must be strictly enforced". The council also prohibited the swimming together of the men and women. Times were set for each sex to swim.

In 1903, a horse strayed onto the bridge causing considerable damage. The Council resolved to instal turnstiles at each end of the bridge.

== 1909 storm and flood, and new bridge ==
On 2 March 1909, a violent storm washed a large quantity of earth onto the eastern side of the suspension bridge which had to be removed in order to release the pressure.

The storm also washed through the cemetery tearing down the fence and one newspaper jocularly reported that three coffins were washed onto the suspension bridge.

Repairs were conducted in April 1909, having been delayed though cables not being procurable in the state.

Then in August 1909 a flood from heavy rains occurred which put the suspension bridge under water, greatly straining its supports. Following this, the York Municipal Council resolved to erect a new suspension bridge.

Work started in March 1910 using Council employees and day labour under the direction of the Town Clerk and a Works Committee. The new bridge was paid for by the York Municipal Council.

Immediately there was controversy over the method of construction. Councillor Smith questioned the wisdom of using iron bolts to connect cables to the posts. One of the members of the Works Committee, a fitter and engineer and former trade union leader Charles Hasforth, responded assuring the public that the new suspension bridge had been well designed. Hasforth reported that the new bridge was capable of bearing twice the number of persons as the previous bridge.

== Drowning ==
In 1904, 8-year-old, August Swanson, was standing on a raft holding a wire from the bridge to some trees. He was pulling himself on the raft when his foot slipped and he and the raft separated. He held on to the wire for a few seconds and then dropped into the river. His body came to the surface twice and then he sank out of sight and drowned.

== Suicide ==
In 1913, expiree 70-year-old George Kent was told he had to move into an old men's home and to avoid this, he jumped off the suspension bridge, ensuring he would not float by loading the cuffs of his trousers with stones, which were secured tightly. He was found in the river the next morning.

== Bridge collapse ==
In August 1946, at about 3:45 pm, 30 hikers on a Railway Department excursion, including a number of children, were on the bridge "gaily" swinging it back and forth when a cable snapped and all 30 were thrown into the river.

One woman had her leg caught in the wire netting. Many lost personal belongings including footwear, handbags and hats but "apart from immersion, no one suffered from the accident". The hikers lit a fire and dried their clothing by its warmth. Others were taken to homes of local residents where warm clothes were provided until their own were dry. The St John Ambulance men arrived to check for injuries.

== 1988 reconstruction ==
The bridge fell into disrepair and was closed in the early 1980s. In 1988, it was reconstructed to coincide with its centenary.

It continues to be well used, and well maintained by the Shire of York, and is a popular tourist attraction.
