= Western Australian Bank, York =

Building in York, Western Australia

Western Australian Bank
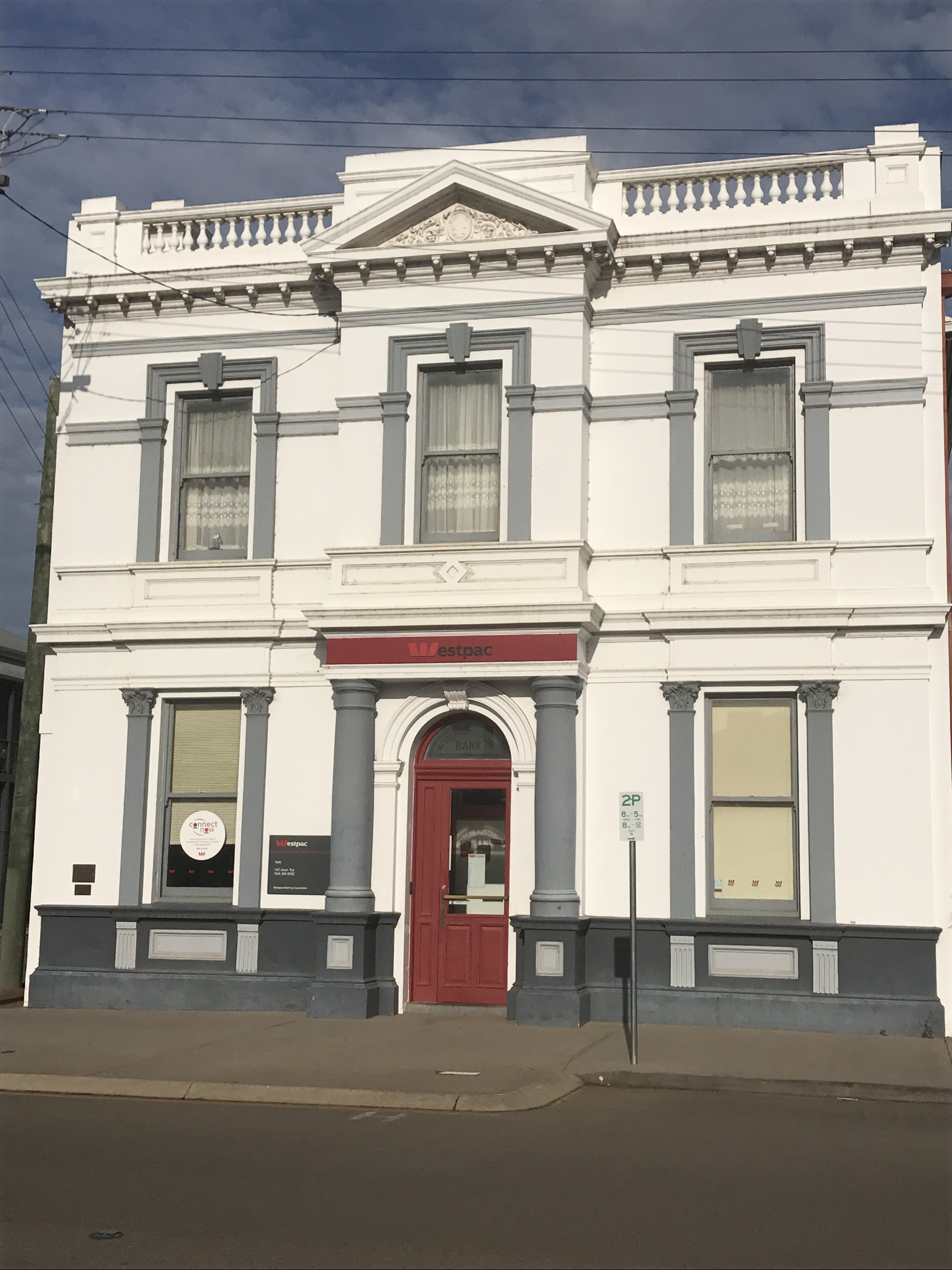
- Western Australian Bank, York, in 2018
- Interactive map of the Western Australian Bank area
- Alternative names: Bank of New South Wales, Westpac

General information
- Location: 147 Avon Terrace, York, Western Australia
- Coordinates: 31.8879°S 116.7683°E
- Construction started: 1889

Design and construction
- Architecture firm: Talbot Hobbs

References
- York municipal inventory

The Western Australian Bank building in York is the third oldest surviving bank building in Western Australia and, until 27 September 2019, was the oldest still in-use as a bank. (Note: Older are the former National Bank 1881 and Union Bank 1884 in Albany)

== History ==
The building was designed by the architect, Talbot Hobbs, in Victorian Academic Classical style. Hobbs designed other banks for the Western Australian Bank. The land on which the building stands was purchased from the estate of William Kett in 1889.

The bank opened for business on 24 August 1889. James Rose was its first manager. Above the bank office is the manager's residence. At the time of its opening, the bank was next door to Edwards & Co's chemist's shop.

The Western Australian Bank amalgamated with the Bank of New South Wales in 1927. In 1982, it merged with the Commercial Bank of Australia to form Westpac. Westpac closed its branch on 27 September 2019.

The building was placed on the register of the National Estate on 21 March 1978 and was classified by the National Trust on 5 March 1985.
