= David Gault =

Australian rules footballer

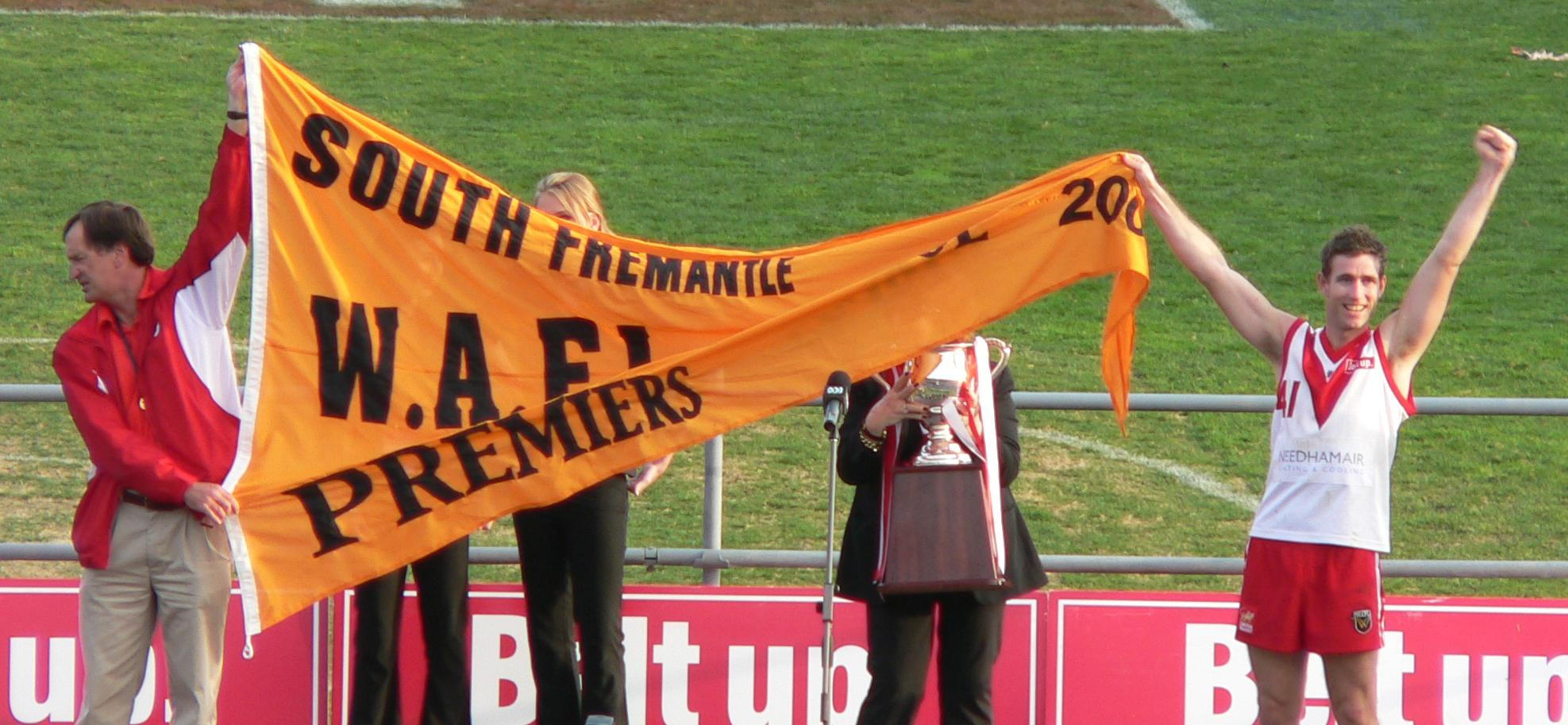
- John Dimmer and David Gault celebrate after winning the 2005 WAFL grand final

Personal information
- Full name: David Andrew Gault
- Born: 2 August 1975 (age 51); York, Western Australia
- Original team: York

Playing career^{1}
Years	Club	Games (Goals)
1996–2007	South Fremantle	211 (42)
- ^{1} Playing statistics correct to the end of 2007.

Career highlights
- WAFL Premiership Player - 1997, 2005

David Andrew Gault (born 2 August 1975) is a former Australian rules footballer who played for the South Fremantle Football Club in the West Australian Football League between 1996 and 2007. He was captain of the club from 2005 until his retirement in 2007.

Originally from York, he made his debut in 1996 and played in two premiership sides, in 1997, when South Fremantle beat East Fremantle in a derby grand final, and as captain in 2005, as well as three losing grand finals.

In 2005 he became a life member of the South Fremantle Football Club, and in 2007 became the 17th player to play 200 games for South Fremantle. Whilst never regarded as a star player, more of an honest toiler, Gault is one of the few players in recent times to reach 200 state league games without ever representing his state or playing in the Australian Football League.

Outside of football he is the Director of Sport at Aquinas College.In July 2021, he moved to Scotch College.
