= Wara art =

Wara art is the Japanese art of making large sculptures from rice straw.

== Wara art in Japan ==
Traditionally, rice straw was used for making tatami mats and other objects. At the beginning of the 21st century, these objects were increasingly replaced by manmade materials, leaving rice farmers with a problem, namely what to do with the rice straw. In 2007, the farming community in Niigata prefecture, Japan, a major rice growing prefecture, asked Professor Shingo Miyajima of the Department of Science and Design at the Musashino University to find a creative solution for the problem. He suggested using the straw to create sculptures of animals supported by a wooden frame. This straw art is called in Japan, wara art, “wara” meaning rice straw.

Since 2007, there have been annual festivals of wara art in Niigata prefecture, Nishikan-ku ward. Some of the Wara art statues have been as high as 9 metres tall, but they are usually around 4 metres in height.

== Wara art in York, Western Australia ==
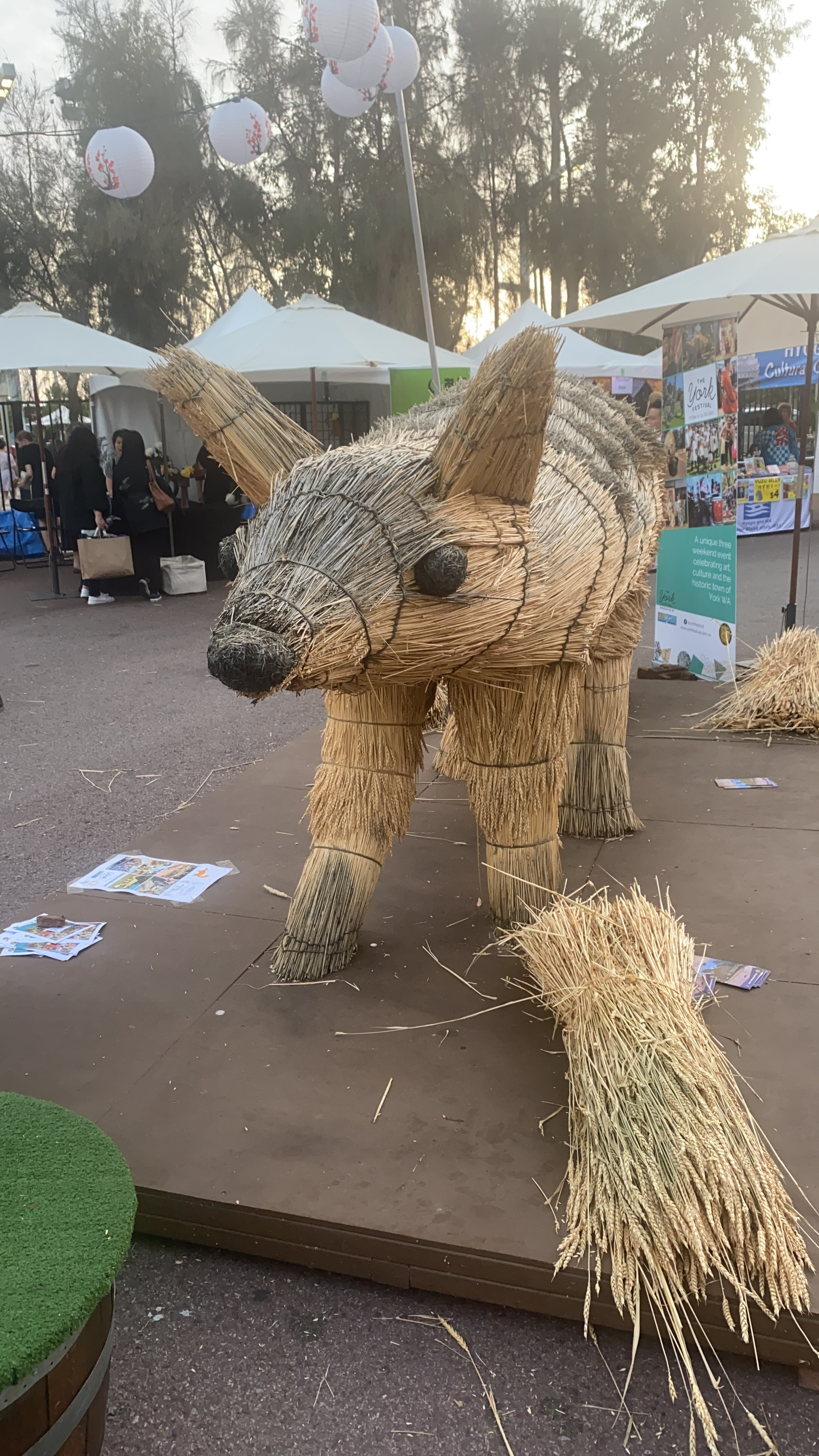
Straw sculpture of the endangered numbat, York, Western Australia

Wara art sculptures of endangered Australian animals, designed by Professor Miyajima, have also been created in York, Western Australia as part of the annual York Festival. There are seven statues in York. They were constructed by Australian fibre artists and Japanese wara artists brought to Australia as part of Japanese/ Australian art exchanges, assisted by many volunteers. As there is no rice straw in Western Australia, the York sculptures are made from wheat straw sourced from a York farm that still harvests in stooks.
