= Avon Park, York =

Park in York, Western Australia

Avon Park
- Interactive map of the Avon Park area
- Alternative names: Pioneer Avon Park

General information
- Location: Lowe St, York, Western Australia
- Coordinates: 31°53′16″S 116°46′13″E
- Opened: 1891

Avon Park is a park adjacent to the centre of the town of York, Western Australia, on the Avon River.

== History ==
The land between Lowe Street and the Avon River was amongst the first of the town allotments surveyed in 1841.

From March 1857, the York Agricultural Society was given the right to use the land adjacent to the south of Macartney Street as a showground “until required for other purposes”. And from that time, it was continuously used for the York Agricultural Fair. In 1885 the Society procured a 99-year lease from the government of that land for a peppercorn rent.

The land immediately to the north, between what is now Christie Retreat and Macartney Street, was unused, but was one of the few pieces of land that the public could enter along the Avon River. The Society used the land, which it leased, to display and auction animals, but the whole of the land alongside Bland’s Pool was used as a fair ground.

In May, 1890, the Commissioners of the York Agricultural Society requested the York Municipal Council grant them the strip of land between lots 10 and 11, on the undeveloped extension of Mcartney Street between Lowe Street and the river. This would have meant that the York Agricultural Society would have been in possession of the rotunda and to the Municipality, this was unacceptable. The Council decided “to take no further interest in the matter”.

A month later, the Society demanded that not only the Macartney strip of land but the entire reserve (lots 9 and 10) be “handed over” to the Society for the purpose of extending the show ground. At that time, the mayor was Kenneth Edwards, who was also vice-chairman of the York Agricultural Society. Two other councillors were also members of the Society.

The York Municipal Council’s response was to declare and establish Avon Park on the land to the north of Macartney Street on 20 August 1891.

The ceremony of opening the new public park in this township was performed on Thursday afternoon last by the Mayor (Mr. W. Dinsdale) in the presence of the members of the Municipal Council and a few other citizens. Previous to the ceremony the ground was inspected and properly marked out. This having been done, a hole was dug into which the Mayor placed a small ornamental tree, at the same lime declaring the park open. At the invitation of the Mayor the company then adjourned to the "York Hotel" where refreshments were partaken of. The health of the Mayor proposed in very flattering terms by Mr. Frank Craig was warmly received, and suitably responded to. Success to Avon Park was also drunk, after which the company separated.

At the time, the mayor lived and ran a business from his property immediately above the park at Dinsdale's Shoe Emporium. The establishment of Avon Park cost the Council about £55. Thomas Thorn must have funded some of the costs or provided services in relation to the park because on 4 September 1891, the Clerk was instructed to write to him on behalf of the council to thank him for his valuable services rendered in connection with Avon Park.

Almost immediately, there was vandalism: “some unscrupulous larrikin has been amusing himself of late by cutting several of the trees in Avon Park”. There were suggestions that the council should swap land on the other side of the railway line to be used for the Fair, which would allow Avon Park to be extended southwards.

In November 1893, public baths were erected adjacent to Avon Park, “which have proved a boon and convenience to the community and visitors to our township”.

In May 1894, lots 9 and 10 were vested in the Municipality, but at the annual meeting of the York Agricultural Society at the Castle Hotel in December 1894 there was almost unanimous approval to once again seek to acquire lots 9 and 10 from the Municipality.

Edward Read Parker, who was one of the few Society members who did not agree to the acquisition, wrote a letter to the paper taking the position of ratepayers against the “alien institution [seeking] to usurp the occupation of their only water-side pleasure ground”. Another correspondent accused the Society of trying to “rob the ratepayers of the only piece of river frontage they possess…..why does the committee set to work and change its position to a more suitable one and not one located in the very centre of our principal business thoroughfare”.

Eventually this is what occurred through the intervention of the state government. After protracted negotiations, in October 1897, the state government provided a grant of £500 to the Municipality to “buy back” the 99-year lease on the show ground, and the Society later purchased two blocks of land in Brunswick Street to establish a new show ground. Lots 11 and 12 were vested in the Municipality in May 1898.

== Avon Park today ==
Avon Park was upgraded in 2020 with a budget of around $350,000 and continued to be one of the most popular parks in York.
