= York Flour Mill =

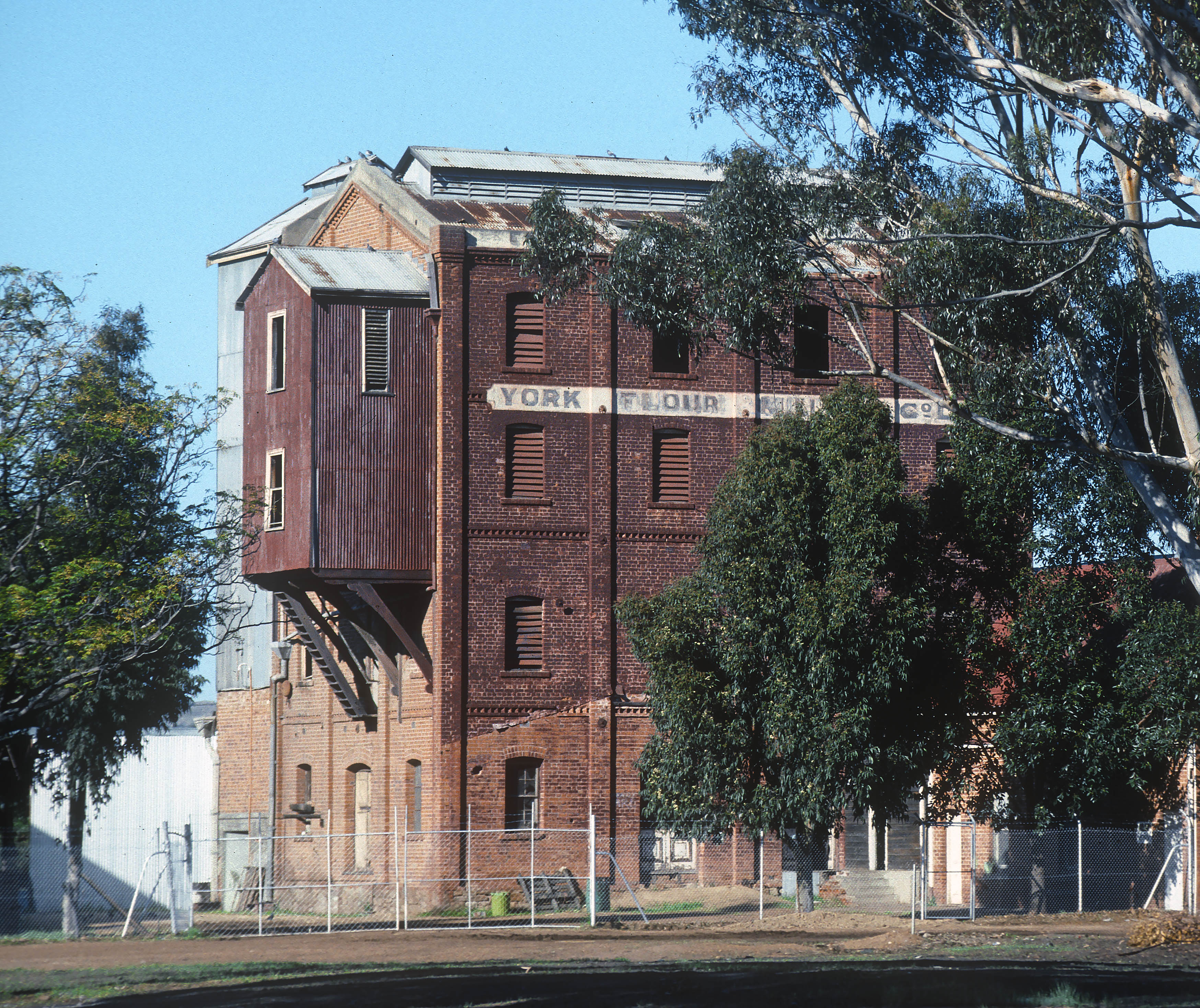
- The York Flour Mill
- Interactive map of the York Flour Mill area
- Former names: Empire Roller Flour Mill, Jah Roc Furniture, The Old Mill, York

General information
- Location: 10 Henrietta St, York, Western Australia
- Coordinates: 31°53′38″S 116°45′59″E
- Opened: 1892

Western Australia Heritage Register
- Official name: York Flour Mill
- Type: State Registered Place
- Designated: 31 December 1993
- Reference no.: 2872

The York Flour Mill is a purpose-built flour mill in York, Western Australia, constructed in 1892 with associated buildings built from 1892 onwards, to mill flour for York and the surrounding districts, and for export.

The mill is the only remaining mill building in York, a town whose prosperity was built upon growing wheat and grain.

== Construction ==
The York Flour Mill was built in 1892 by Messrs Thorn, Bower, Stewart and Monger for the Empire Roller Flour Milling Co. The mill opened on 24 May 1892 "in the presence of a large body of spectators" with the promoters appearing to be "sanguine of the success of their venture". The first manager was LJ Thorn. At the time, it was the largest flour mill in Western Australia.

In 1893, the Eastern Districts Chronicle described the Empire Flour Mills "as the premier mills in the colony. Every attention has been paid, and no expense spared, in fitting this lofty and commodious building up with the latest and best milling apparatus procurable. The huge stacks of wheat alongside acquaint us of the fact of a large quantity to grind, and testify to the capabilities of this district as a wheat producing centre."

In 1896, William Dinsdale Jr, boot retailer, who also ran another mill on the corner of River Street and Avon Terrace, became manager. Dinsdale was twice Mayor of York and had built Dinsdale's Shoe Emporium in 1887.

Dinsdale went into partnership with Bower and they leased the new mill as Empire Milling Co, and subsequently purchased it. The Empire Milling Co exported flour to Hong Kong and Singapore.

In 1908, the company and mill were purchased by the consortium Messrs Marwick, Meinck and Edwards, and became the York Flour Milling Company Limited.

== Operation as a flour mill ==
Wheat was brought to the mill in bags and stacked outside under sheets of corrugated iron. On the ground floor stood a 20-horsepower horizontal engine, a steam hoist, 13 grain elevators and the machinery for screening the grain to remove foreign matter such as gravel and oat seed.

On the first floor, the grain was rolled. On the second floor, the bran was separated from the pollard, and on the third floor, it was dressed. The flour was then returned to the ground floor where it was machine packed into bags and loaded to an immense storage shed served by its own railway siding and loaded for the Fremantle docks.

The mill could handle about 150,000 bushels of wheat each year, producing 3,000 tons of flour, 900 tons of bran and 450 tons of pollard.

Three eight hour shifts were worked, providing employment for large numbers of men. When the export trade petered out, the machinery was sold and many hands were laid off work, but the buildings continued to be used for chaff cutting.

Railway tracks allowed easy access for rail cartage to the Fremantle Docks for export.

Major additions were made in the 1930s to the east and west of the mill building, accommodated in a tall timber-framed building clad in corrugated iron. In 1967, flour milling ceased and men were laid off, machinery was sold and the mill was transferred to the Co-operative Bulk Handling Co, which sold the mill to Burridge and Warren in 1971.

== Fire ==
In 1976, a fire burnt a silo next to the mill building. The silo was 26m high and the fire was contained within an hour. The York Volunteer Brigade attended and the Northam Volunteer Brigade was called out at 6:45 am. As the Northam Brigade sped towards York, billowing smoke could be seen over the town. The firemen were hampered by a lack of water pressure and a burst water main during the five-hour battle. No long ladder was available to take a hose over the 26m high wall. Burridge and Warren spent $30,000 to rebuild the burnt section.

== Subsequent uses ==
In 1992, the building was purchased by Jah Roc, a furniture manufacturing business, and the ground floor was converted into showrooms and craft studios.

It is now a retail centre with a café and gallery.

== Architecture ==
The mill is built in Federation Warehouse style.

== Classification ==
The building is classified by the National Trust of Australia (5 March 1985), is permanently on the Register of the National Estate (21 March 1978), on the State Register Permanent (31 December 1993; #2872), and on the Shire register (31 December 1995).
