= York Palace Hotel =

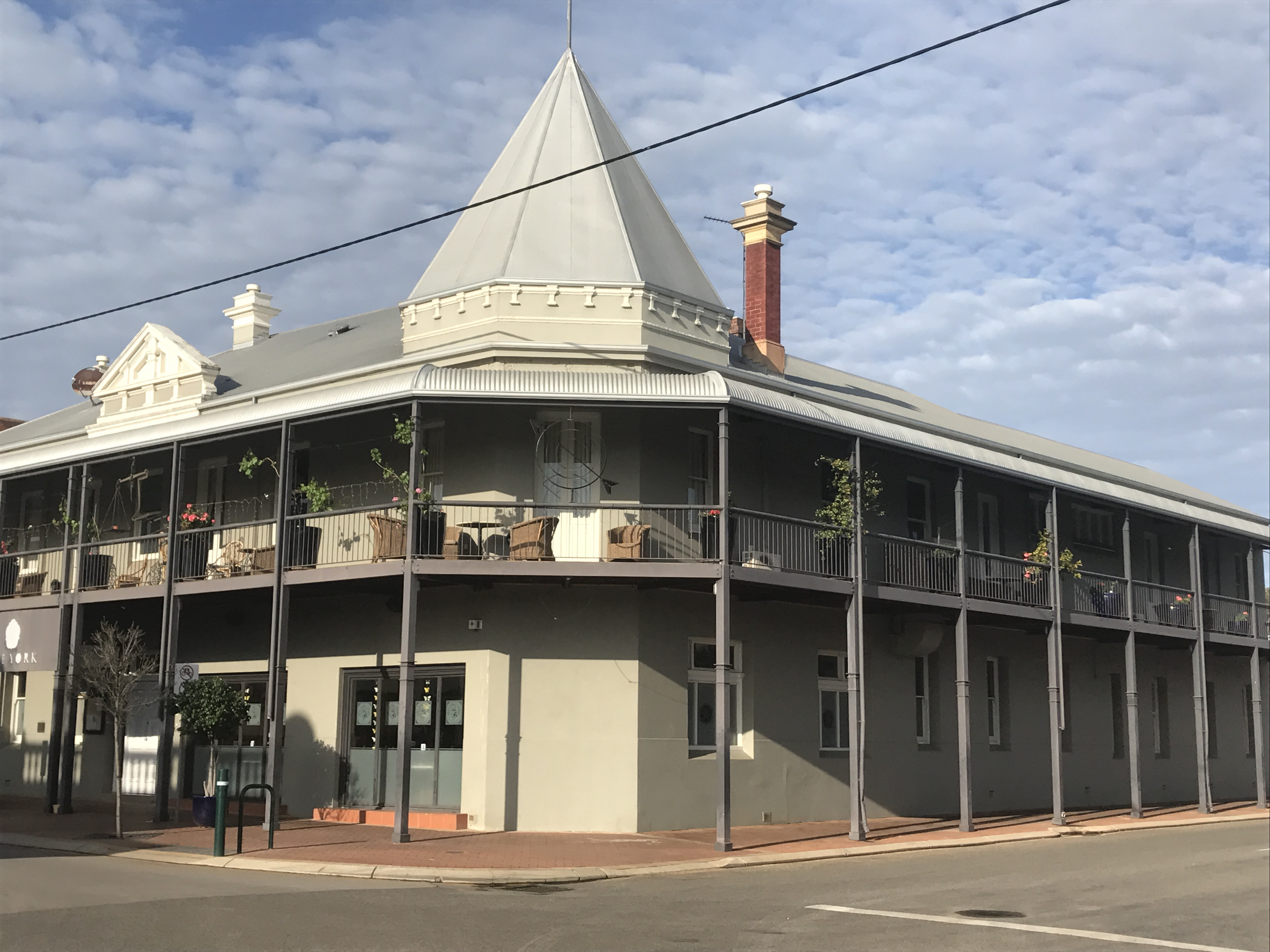
- York Palace Hotel
- Interactive map of the York Palace Hotel area

General information
- Architectural style: Federation Free Classical
- Location: Avon Terrace, York, Western Australia
- Coordinates: 31°53′17″S 116°46′06″E
- Construction started: 1909
- Renovated: 1997

The York Palace Hotel, in York, Western Australia, was a major building constructed in 1909 during a building boom in that town in the first decade of the 20th century.

== Hoops' store ==
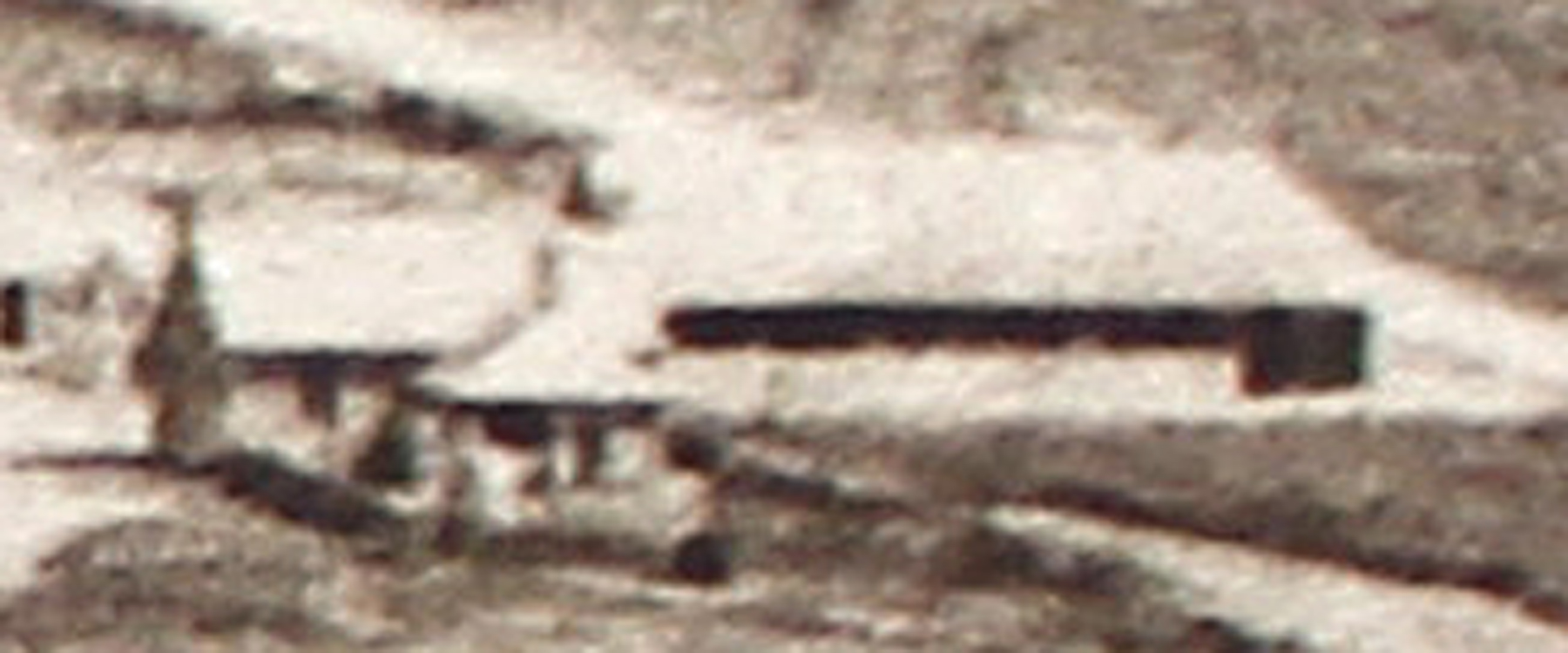
Hoops store (to the rear) in 1877

The land on which the hotel was later to be constructed was granted to the local police sergeant, Thomas Bailey, in 1854 for £6.

The land was sold to William Wigmore Hoops on 1 July 1871 for £450.

Hoops constructed a store on the property.

In 1891, Richard Hoops became the owner of the property. In 1898, mortgagees foreclosed on Richard Hoops.

== Transfer to Matthew Ryan ==
In 1907, the property was purchased by Matthew Ryan for £1,350. Ryan was a local farmer.

== Construction and opening ==
Ryan demolished Hoops' Store and constructed the Palace Hotel on the property.

The architect was Ernest Edward Giles and the builder was J V Miles.

The Palace Hotel opened on New Year's Day 1909. MacKay and Stone were the licensees.

"The hotel has been planned and constructed on most up-to-date lines, and is a decided ornament to the Terrace, being erected in the centre of the busiest part of the town. The accommodation throughout is admirably arranged, and sufficiently extensive to cope with the demands of the public for some time to come. The bathrooms are lofty and well ventilated, while the private sitting rooms are replete with every comfort and convenience. The well-finished bath-rooms are equipped with hot and cold water services, while the sanitary conveniences are modern and complete, the septic tank system being in vogue. The billiard-room is fitted up with one of Alcock's tables and all the latest accessories. An acetylene gas plant supplies the lighting throughout the premises. The furnishing of the hotel was entrusted to the well known manufacturer. Mr W Zimpel, of Perth, and has been very capably carried out."

== Music hall ==
A large music hall was added behind the hotel in 1910, constructed by F Sempf.

== Reichardt ==
In 1913, the hotel business was sold to Paul Reichardt.

== Explosives ==
Ryan continued to own the hotel property until September 1921. The mortgagee (Louis Abrahams of Mia Mia Pastoral Co) sold the freehold to PA Connelly and Freda Hale. Ryan refused to give up possession of the hotel. He is quoted as saying: "I am not going to budge. He has robbed me of about £5,000. Now to be taken out without house or home, you can guess that it will be a case of a contest until my securities are restored."

He is reported to have informed Police Sgt Haggar at York that before anyone would take the hotel from him, he would blow it up. Police took out a search warrant and searched the hotel and found Ryan with gelignite, fuse, and detonators. Ryan was charged with unlawfully having the explosives in his possession for the purpose of blowing up the hotel. At the trial, Detective Sergeant Cowie said Ryan confessed to intending to blow up the hotel. Ryan said the explosives were for dam sinking and clearing on his farm. Without retiring to consider their verdict, the jury acquitted him.

Later, Ryan sued the Mia Mia Pastoral Co and Abrahams for damages for failing to give a proper demand for £5,550 before selling the hotel and other complaints, was successful and was awarded damages of £446 15s. Mia Mia Pastoral Co and Abrahams appealed to the High Court and the earlier decision for Ryan was set aside.

== Subsequent proprietors ==
In the 1960s, the hotel was owned by the Swan Brewery and its verandah was replaced by a cantilever canopy and the candle-snuffer roofed turret removed.

In 1997, the hotel was purchased by John Hay, who carried out extensive restoration (including restoring the verandah and candle-snuffer roof) and added rooms at the rear. The hotel traded as the York Hotel. After his company went into receivership, the hotel closed in 2012. The hotel was purchased by the current owners and reopened in 2016 as the York Palace Hotel containing the restaurant Alice in the Palace.
