= Walkinshaw Cowan =

Justice of the peace and resident magistrate in Western Australia

Walkinshaw Cowan (25 December 1808 – 22 January 1888) was private secretary to Western Australian Governors John Hutt, Andrew Clarke and Frederick Irwin, then in 1848 he became Guardian of Aboriginals and a justice of the peace, and then resident magistrate at York from 1863 to 1887.

== Early years ==
Walkinshaw Cowan was born on 25 December 1808 in Borrowstounness in Scotland. His father, Thomas Cowan, wanted him to become a merchant. He was indentured to Adam White & Co of Leith, served out four years and established his own business, possibly as a corn merchant, but this failed.

== Arrival in Western Australia ==
Following an offer to Cowan by John Hutt, who had been appointed Western Australian Governor, to become his private secretary, Cowan emigrated to the Swan River Colony on the same ship as Hutt, Brothers, arriving on 1 January 1839, the trip costing him £320. Two days later, he and two fellow passengers borrowed some horses in Fremantle and rode to Perth. He saw "a sort of herbage which reminded me strongly of the mountain scenery of Scotland".

Within one month of his arrival in the Colony, he recorded having gone on a shooting expedition and becoming hopelessly lost, spending an unexpected and uncomfortable night camped in the bush. The next morning, after trying unsuccessfully to find his own direction back to Perth, he found some friendly Aboriginals who guided him to Mount Eliza, from where he made his way to the Perth settlement. He confessed afterwards that he was completely disoriented because he was using the sun as a guide and forgot that he was in the southern hemisphere, with the sun to the north instead of to the south. As best as we can determine, the locality in which Walkinshaw Cowan became lost was in the area now known as Floreat Park or Wembley. (Note: In his diary, Walkinshaw says his path was corrected by the Postman not aboriginals.)

== Appointments ==
As private secretary to Hutt, Cowan had been told by Hutt that he could live at Government House. In April 1836, he was also appointed clerk of the councils, that is, the Legislative Council and the Executive Council, but Hutt asked him to find his own residence. The relationship between Cowan and Governor Hutt was not cordial, with Hutt being aloof and Cowan finding it difficult to be subservient.

From 1846 to 1848, he would also serve as private secretary to Governors Andrew Clarke and Frederick Irwin.

== Marriage ==
During this period, he lived with and then married Elizabeth Dyer (on 14 June 1842) with whom he would eventually have 11 children. He purchased land at the foot of Mount Eliza (Note: Perth Lot L66: Inquirer, 11 December 1844, p.1.) and borrowed £300 to build a house. The property was well stocked with vines, bananas and other fruit trees. He contracted the painful eye disease ophthalmia and was concerned that he would become blind. Consequently he took leave of absence from October 1842 until December 1844.

== Steam milling adventure ==
In 1843, he was the main promoter of the Guildford Steam Saw and Flour Mills, a business which intended to run a steam-driven sawmill and flour mill at Guildford. In this venture, he was given technical sawmilling assistance from engineer John Henry Monger Snr, who was also one of the partners in the venture. However the venture failed, Walkinshaw blaming (in his diary) "the misconduct and ignorance of an Engineer". By late 1844 Cowan owed his bankers (George Leake and W B Andrews) a total of £1,238 and he assigned all his property to them, his house and land were sold, and Cowan returned to his duties as clerk of the Council and private secretary to the Governor. A writ of fi fa was issued against him in June 1845. A meeting of creditors was called on 11 August 1849, and then a later meeting for a deed of composition.

== Appointment to York ==
In July 1847, Cowan was appointed as Resident for King George Sound, however Cowan declined to accept the office because of "smallness of salary". Then after Charles Fitzgerald became governor, on 6 February 1848, he appointed Rivett Henry Bland, who had been Resident Magistrate in York and Beverley, as personal secretary and Clerk of the Council, and on 4 September 1848, Cowan was appointed Guardian of Aborigines for York. He was also appointed as a Justice of the Peace, in addition to also being in charge of the police.

Cowan saw this appointment as a demotion. He was at one time disputing a directive from Government House and reminded the person with whom he was corresponding that he had "served immediately under the Governor of this Colony in a higher station than that of Guardian of Aborigines". Cowan set off for York in a cart drawn by a team of bullocks. He was cautious of Aboriginals on his trip to York:

It is customary to carry guns on the York road, as many opportunities are presented by the thickness of the bush for the natives called the “halfway house tribe’, from mixing less frequently with the white people, are more savage and daring…. [and on arriving at Mahogany Inn] I would not be surprised to find all the inmates of the inn had been murdered in their beds.

Cowan’s later recollection of York at that time was as follows:

The country was a wilderness of bush, with only a few mud houses in York, and only one or two children, of which Mr Henry Parker, Member for Perth, was one. A universal gloom seemed to pervade the district. I often said I never heard a ploughman here whistle to his plough as at home, I only recollect hearing one man whistle, and that was an Irishman. The only road party at the time was a gang of native prisoners. They were clearing along the line marked out by Mr Gregory towards Mr Hoops; I was riding on before through the bush to see the work that had to be done, and when I came to the top of a hill I heard a lively tune being whistled. I pulled up, and presently a pair of kangaroo dogs rushed up, followed by a small man on an active little half-bred Timor pony.

== Guardian of Aborigines ==
As Guardian of Aborigines, Cowan’s area of responsibility was large, stretching from Gingin in the north to Williams in the south. He had to make a 480 kilometres (300 mi) trip on horseback in remote parts of the territory to discharge his duties. The position of Guardian of Aborigines consumed most of his energies. Cowan recollected about this work:

I had to visit the district from the Williams River to Dundaragan, including Gingin and Bindoon. The settlers’ houses were wretched mud buildings, and I had to sleep in the open air or in a shepherd’s hut. The roads were mere bush tracks, and the settlers, both masters and men, had to cart their produce from 60 to 100 miles, over them, in the dust and heat in summer, and through bogs and ruts in wet winter.

It was dangerous work and several of the Aboriginals working with Cowan were murdered.

Almost immediately, Cowan had a quarrel with John Drummond, who was in charge of native Police in the Avon District. In 1849, Cowan accused Drummond of leaving his district while on duty. He publicly accused him of "disreputable, deceitful and disobedient conduct." In April 1850, a court of inquiry was held at York to enquire into five specific charges by Cowan against Drummond. The first of these was that Drummond went drinking at the Kings Head Hotel with native police assistant Cowits and Tommy the native mail carrier, and did not report or charge anyone. The court found all the charges "not proved being frivoulous and vexatious", though Drummond was suspended from duties for a month.

In January 1850, Cowan produced his report as Guardian of Aborigines for 1849 and noted the "friendly feeling" that prevailed between the settlers and the Aboriginals. He expressed concern with the increasing number of native dogs and commented in his conclusions: "I have still to regret that no means have been employed to teach or convert the natives in the District from their debasing superstitions." Cowan was not slow to severely discipline Aboriginals. To the concern of the Governor, he sentenced a 15-year-old Aboriginal boy to two dozen lashes "for repeated neglect of duty and for taking on Tuesday last, his master [Mr Hoops]'s horse, to Northam remaining away two days instead of going to look for cattle in the bush as ordered and for abusing the said horse, which sentence I accordingly saw inflicted." (Note: In a letter from Eliza Brown, at Grass Dale, to her husband Thomas Brown dated 12 November 1850, she writes after discussing Resident Magistrate Captain Meares: There has been a great deal of stir but I am a bad one for news and cannot give particulars. Cowan put M. under arrest lately, what do you think of that?)

In his report as Guardian of Aborigines for 1851, Cowan expressed the view that “the humane and kind treatment of the aborigines by the settlers of this colony has been the subject of congratulation in all the reports of the Protectors”. There was an absence of aggression and security for settlers on isolated properties.

Cowan took an interest in the Gerald Mission, a mission and school being established by the Wesleyan Church for Aboriginal children in York by John Smithies. The mission failed and Cowan blamed the loss of students from the mission school to "yearning" or "strong particularity" to their own districts, but also due to high death rates from influenza at the institution.

In his 1852 report, he refers to the Native police in York and Beverley as “efficient” and goes on to say:

I may notice here, as sowing an advance of civilisation, the instance of Karan, a lad in the service of Mr Viveash, having trenched and planted a portion of ground for a garden, and dug and sown a piece of land with wheat for his own benefit. His Excellency having marked this industry with a suitable reward, others may be encouraged to imitate the example. Much might be done by the landed proprietors with the natives attached to their estates, if portions of land were set apart for them, and the young were assisted in building cottages, they might gradually be weaned from the bush, and thus be brought ere long within the reach of permanent instruction.

The native young men continue to be employed at the different farms; as general servants, some having charge of teams, as shepherds and herdsmen, in hunting in cattle and horses from the bush, for which they will always be most in request; in reaping and in other occupations. But they will return to the bush and to the habits of their race, during a portion of the year, and remain until they tire of bush fare, and begin to long for the luxuries of tea, sugar and flour; whilst they are rendering themselves useful to the settler.

In this report, Cowan also expressed concern for the effect of drunkenness and vice, and new diseases.

One of the difficult duties Cowan had was to destroy native dogs.

Historian John Deacon said of Cowan's time in office:

Walkinshaw Cowan applied himself so diligently to the study of the aboriginal, that he was able to publish an interesting monograph on the subject, and he was generally recognised as an authority on the West Australian native.

== Cowan’s respect for Cowits, native policeman ==
When Cowan was first appointed as Protector of Natives in York, John Drummond conveyed a message to Cowan via Cowits. Cowits was about 16 at the time. Cowan thought Cowits was very efficient and recommended that he be appointed as the first native assistant in York. Cowan recorded in his diary and also wrote in 1868 about this:

Drummond sent a message to me from Toodyay, forty-five miles distant, by a native named Cowits. This message was received and delivered to me between sunrise and sunset of the same day. Finding how efficiently this native acted with Mr Drummond, and seeing the great benefit that would attend the permanent appointment of native assistants to the police force, I recommended their appointment, and Governor Fitzgerald having agreed to it, Cowits was the first native police assistant in York. Another was appointed for Toodyay, and the employment of them became general throughout the colony. Cowits showed the greatest intelligence in the profession. His word was always to be depended upon, and his pluck and endurance were of the first description. When Mr Drummond left the police, soldiers were appointed in York and Toodyay as police constables. Entirely ignorant of the language, the police constables had to depend on Cowits, who from that time considered himself the head of the police.

On 26 August 1850, Cowan wrote to the Governor on behalf of Cowits:

The Native Policeman Cowits appears very anxious to obtain an allotment in the Town of York where he might have a house built and make a garden for himself. He has now got wife and I would be glad if His Excellency would assign him an allotment near to the Barracks, or opposite my house, in order to see what effect it might have on the Natives of the District. He has a number of brothers more or less employed by the settlers, one indeed has the sole charge of Mr Carter’s shop, (Note: At Daliak, refer to advertisement for T & H Carter dated 9 August 1853 in Perth Gazette & Independent Journal of Politics and News, 12 August 1853, p.2.) and the example of the Native Policeman established in a comfortable house might lead them to desire to be similarly settled and to abandon their roaming life. A nucleus might thus be formed around which a throng of the Aborigines might congregate”.

Cowan did not receive a reply to his letter on behalf of Cowits and wrote again on 28 October 1851:

Some time back I applied for an allotment on the Townsite of York for the Native Cowit, attached to the Mounted Police, to build a House and make a garden on, but have had no official reply to my letter. The upper part of the allotment on which the Barrack stables are built on is vacant, and as it is desirable that he should be near my house, it would be convenient His Excellency should give him permission to build on this and enclose it for a garden. At their leisure the Police Constable Bailey and Cowit might do a good deal towards building the house and enclosing the allotment. But I trust His Excellency will grant the assistance of a Ticket of Leave man to construct the walls.

Governor Fitzgerald responded:

There is no objection to allowing this native to erect a building on the allotment in question but he must be his own architect.

When Cowits died, Cowan said of him:

Off and on he has been in the employment of the Government for nearly twenty years. He was out in the early exploration with Dr Landor. He was attached to Mr Lefroy and Mr Hunt in their several expeditions, and also was engaged in many private ones. He has accompanied me in my periodical visits from York to the Williams River and back, and from York to Dundarragan (sic), taking in Gingin and Bindoon, a stretch of 300 miles and upwards. I always felt the greatest confidence in him, and greatly preferred him with me to one of the soldiers. In this native there was no vulgarity. He was one of nature’s gentlemen. There was no end to his spirit, cheerfulness and anecdote. Every spot had its legend or tale.

== Convict march on race day ==
Cowan’s duties as Justice of the Peace increased after the arrival of convicts in the York District in 1850. On a hot day in January 1851, about 20 convicts were working at the Cut Hill depot at the top of the hill on the Perth road, and these convicts knew that there was a race on in York. So 20 “probationary” convicts armed themselves with stakes and clubs (so no-one would stop them) and headed down the hill to the town to go to the races, preceded by one of their party blowing a horn. Walkinshaw Cowan, who was in charge of the police, only had two sergeants and three constables on duty. With the presumed assistance of the native police, he gathered 60 Noongar to guard the residents of the town. Cowan rode to the Stewards at the racetrack who suspended the races and joined Cowan to confront the convicts.

When the convicts arrived at the town and asked the way to the race course, they were told by Cowan and the stewards that the race meeting had been postponed. Cowan advised them to return to their camp immediately and he would recommend that the incident be overlooked. The convicts decided not to confront Cowan and breach their probation and (except for two who were subsequently arrested) marched back up to Cut Hill.

The local Noongar had also armed themselves with good sticks “in expectation of a good row” and were disappointed that this did not eventuate. The settlers raised 30 shillings for the Aboriginals and Cowan also rewarded them with a bag of flour.

The Governor later heard of the story and awarded three more sacks of flour for the Aboriginals.

== Residing at Grass Dale ==
In November 1851, Cowan took a lease of the "house, vineyard, paddock etc" at Grass Dale from Thomas Brown, the farm itself already being let.

== Fall from horse ==
In September 1852, Cowan "met with a serious accident while kangaroo hunting.... His horse ran him against a blackboy and injured him so severely that he was conveyed to his residence in a senseless state". This occurred about 8 kilometres (5 mi) from York. He received several severe contusions about the shoulder and ribs. The "native who accompanied him" (Note: Presumably Cowits.) helped him reach a house from where he was taken to York.

== Farming at Mile Pool ==
Cowan tried farming at Mile Pool, close to York. (Note: This appears to be the same land as had been allotted to the Gerald Mission, north of Cowan St. Remains of the farm house are at the west end close to the pool.)

In August 1854, an arsonist lit and burnt Cowan's haystack of 3,000 kilograms (3 long tons) at his home. Cowan pursued the man and caught him on the road to York. On 7 February 1858, the roof of Cowan's house was stripped in a "severe whirlwind storm", and his gardens destroyed. On 30 December 1858, Cowan's household was disturbed at midnight by a burglar. Patrick Mulligan was charged, put on trial in Perth, and sentenced to jail for 6 years.

Cowan was active in the York Horticultural and Floricultural Society and even won a prize for his grapes and nectarines.

In 1862, a bath was being prepared for his youngest child aged 2 years and 4 months. (Note: This was Ernest Arthur. Another son, Alexander Alfred, also died in the same year, and son Walkinshaw died in 1866.) The servant went out of the room to get some hot water, and in her absence, the child crawled into the tub in which it was to be washed. The servant returned and, the room being dark, she threw the hot water into the tub and the child was scalded and died.

Cowan's farming venture failed and he was forced to sell the property to pay his debts. The farm was advertised in April 1867 as having "100 acres of superior Land. About 76 acres are cleared and fenced, with a frontage of a number of fine town allotments, and a splendid pool of fresh water. ALSO, Two Dwelling Houses containing 8 Rooms, an out-door Kitchen, Store, Stable, Stockyard and Hay-yard well fenced in, Pigstyes, 1 ½ acres of garden well-stocked with vines and splendid fruit trees, and slabbed; Flower and Kitchen Garden fenced and slabbed."

== Appointment as Resident Magistrate ==
For many years, Cowan had been carrying out many of the duties of Resident Magistrate and was expected to replace Captain Meares when he retired in 1857. (Note: Cowan as a Magistrate was actually receiving a greater salary than Meares as Resident Magistrate.) Instead, an Acting Resident Magistrate was appointed (Lewis J Bayly) whom for a while, Cowan represented in his absence, and then when Bayly took office, Cowan appears to have attended or also done everything that Bayly did. Governor Kennedy explained that the failure to appoint Cowan was due to his lack of good health. In July 1863, Bayly was reassigned elsewhere and Cowan was appointed Resident Magistrate of York and Beverley, but on the same salary he was receiving as Guardian of Aborigines. The Perth Gazette wrote: "as to the benefit likely to be derived from this change, public opinion is considerably divided – of two evils, choose the least, would express some parties opinion fairly."

In September 1863, Cowan accused Fr Francisco Salvado (not related to Bishop Rosendo Salvado), the local Catholic priest in York, of having an involvement with a young woman who was his housekeeper. Salvado defended himself but was stood down and forced to return to Spain.

After several complaints to the Governor about the lack of suitable official accommodation for himself and his family, Cowan moved from his property at Mile Pool to a cottage on the east side of the Avon River, previously occupied by the medical officer attached to the Depot Hospital, Dr Robert McCoy. The cottage was gradually extended to accommodate his large family and is now the building known as the Residency Museum.

== Disputes with William Marwick and Edward Millett ==
Cowan kept pigs at his home which frequently wandered to William Marwick's wheat stack. Marwick could not seek the assistance of the pound-keeper because he was James Cowan, Walkinshaw's son (born 1848), who Cowan had appointed pound-keeper, as well as Postmaster and Magistrate's clerk in 1864, when he was 16. In March 1866, Marwick impounded 8 pigs, but released them on Cowan saying that if he claimed damages from the pound-keeper, Cowan would pay. Marwick claimed damages but James Cowan, the pound-keeper did not recognise any damages and said Marwick should take the matter to the magistrate, who was of course Walkinshaw Cowan. Marwick resorted to writing to the paper, complaining about the situation and Cowan's 16-year-old boy being appointed pound-keeper.

The Rev Edward Millett, the Anglican Chaplain in York, had an unfortunate disorder called tic doloreux. This disorder causes a severe stabbing to one side of the face and is extremely painful. To cope with the pain, the Rev Millett took opium. He did this quite openly and all his congregation were aware of this. Walkinshaw Cowan appears to have unfortunately never understood the problems Millett had and concluded that Millett was perpetually drunk. Cowan accused Millett of “drunkenness, laziness, general moral delinquency and a diminished sense of responsibility”. Millett was outraged by these allegations being made against him.

The Anglican Bishop, the Principal Medical Officer in Perth and Perth Police Magistrate Edward Wilson Landor all came to York to inquire into the matter. They concluded that there was no evidence that Millett drank alcohol and that any “stupefaction” was due to his taking opium because of his disorder. They noted that “the general feeling of people in the District (so far as was ascertained) appears to be one of respect and regard for Mr Millett”. They found that instead of him neglecting the sick as he had been charged, the contrary was shown.

== Retirement ==
On 16 April 1870 there was a public meeting at the Mechanics Hall, York, to discuss representative government for Western Australia. Cowan spoke not as the Government Resident but as a "settler". He questioned whether meetings of such a nature should be held without being called through him, and then opposed representative government. He was attacked by the Express for his position:

It is full time that this gentleman, now enfeebled by years, a severe accident, and the cares incident to bringing up a large family on small means, should be pensioned off. He has done well, he has two sons, clerks to magistrates, neither of them yet of age, the elder of whom, before he was 16 was clerk to the Magistrates, Postmaster, and Pound-keeper at York, and by no means competent for such positions. We do not wish to press heavily upon a struggling man, but we protest, firstly against his taking part in political matters, the more imperative, as we understand he could not even qualify as a Freeholder under the act, next against his interpretation of the meeting's legality, and lastly against the absurdity of his oracular pretentions as the Secretary of Governor Hutt, a third if not a fourth-rate Colonial Governor. It is quite time that he retired, and if the York RM will take a fool's advice, he will do so at once, and save Mr Weld the disagreeable necessity of suggesting (and a charitable act) the advisability of tendering it.

Three weeks later a number of prominent citizens of York published an advertisement defending Cowan.

In April 1871 there was another public gathering at the Castle Hotel to discuss land regulations. Cowan chose the occasion to urge the growing of vegetables.

In 1876, Cowan was reported as unwell, and in 1877, there were rumours that Cowan was proposing to retire as Resident Magistrate. The Inquirer and Commercial News wrote: "I was surprised to learn this morning among the queries from York in your Friday's contemporary that there is a probability of our R.M. retiring from the York Bench. Surely this is not true! York would be up in arms at the bare idea of sustaining such a loss. Oh dear! What weeping and wailing there will be if dear Mr. Cowan departs from among us."

In March 1878, Cowan was in the act of mounting his horse when the horse made a sudden plunge and Cowan fell, receiving an injury to his hip.

At a dinner for Governor Ord on 9 May 1878, Colonial Secretary Stephen Stanley Parker gave a speech to honour Cowan and said:

I testify to his independent action in public matters and impartiality in dealing out justice....gentlemanly and courteous in his demeanour, both in his public and private capacity.....and just in the discharge of his onerous duties, for which he had earned great respect.

G M Meares was appointed acting Resident Magistrate on 2 December 1879 "during the temporary absence of W Cowan Esq". (Note: Cowan's wife Elizabeth died on 14 September 1884.) Cowan gave a speech at the opening of the rail link to the York railway station in 1885.

Cowan was reported to be in a "feeble" state in 1886 "and has been unable to attend to his magisterial duties" and "will be unable to do so for some time to come." Cowan retired, at the age of 78, in 1887.

== Other duties ==
Cowan was also secretary of the Government Grammar School (1846) and on the Board of Education from 1873 to 1888.

== Death ==
Cowan died at Fremantle on 22 January 1888. He was survived by 15 children. Edith Cowan was the wife of his son James. Peter Cowan and Hendy Cowan are descendants. A plaque for him and two of his sons who served the York community is at Avon Park, York underneath the pergola.
