= John Taylor (settler) =

John Taylor (1821-1890), son of an Oxford carpenter, was a settler to York, Western Australia who arrived in 1841, was indentured to Thomas Brown, leased and then purchased Yangedine, (Note: This article uses the most common spelling.) used progressive machinery, and built a farming estate.

== Emigration with the Browns ==
Taylor was the son of a carpenter in Oxfordshire. He grew up poor, "earning half a crown a week by cutting turnips for sheep, and how, in the winter, his feet were so covered with chilblains that he could scarcely pull on his boots in the morning, or do anything but 'hobble and cry' for the first quarter of a mile after starting to go to work". (Note: Taylor is identified by The York Society Inc as being the "settler" referred to on pages 119, 120 and 176 of An Australian Parsonage or, the Settler and the Savage in Western Australia by Janet Millett)

Eliza and Thomas Brown took Taylor to Western Australia as an indentured servant. Before leaving, he visited his old master, "who gave him sixpence as a parting present, accompanied by the time honoured advice 'to keep it always in his pocket, so that he might never want money'". (Note: An Australian Parsonage page 119.) He celebrated his 19th birthday on board ship (Note: Sterling.) and arrived in the Colony on 15 March 1841 with a horse and cow and 1/6d. He was indentured until 1844.

Taylor worked for the Browns on their property Grass Dale, though he is never mentioned by name in any of Eliza Brown's letters of the time. (Note: He may have been "one man who had behaved ill" and who "was let depart upon his new master defraying the expenses of his passage": Letter from Eliza Brown to William Bussey 26 September 1842. He is named in some 1851 letters.) He was engaged by the Browns at the rate of £2 per month.

Taylor then shepherded for the Carter brothers (Note: Thomas and Henry Carter owned the farm Daliak, the entrance to which is now at the end of Carter Road in York.) for £40 per annum, and then went to work for Robert Draper.

He married Robert Draper's daughter, Ann Draper (Note: Born 1830.) on 17 November 1846 and in 1847 (Note: He published an advertisement advertising a small bay mare that had strayed onto Yangedine on 9 October 1847.) he rented Yangedine from J W Hardey, and George Shenton Sr started him off with 500 sheep on thirds. "When he when he sowed his first bit of land his wife did the bird-scaring with a decrepit gun, of which the cock was missing, so that she had to hit the cap with a hammer each time she fired." (Note: An Australian Parsonage, page 120.) He started his house as a "rammed wall place".

He was one of those who signed the original petition asking that convicts should be sent to Western Australia.

In mid 1850, a "poor" Irish immigrant was denied rations normally allowed to immigrants because he refused offers of employment by Taylor:

After being made aware of the consequences of a refusal to accept work, this 'poor Irishman' received the following, what most people would consider, and what we certainly do consider, very liberal offer from Mr John Taylor, of Beverley, - viz, 2s6d per diem, with a house and garden rent free, his wife to wash for the family, and receive payment according to the usual colonial rate, one of his children to be clothed and fed in exchange for his services as a childsmaid, and moreover the man to be at liberty to look about and make more satisfactory terms for himself elsewhere if he thought he could better himself. This offer was declined by the 'poor Irishman'. He was consequently considered not a fit object for public sympathy or charity, and it was deemed unjust that the colony, which was put to much expense by the support of these men, should be further burdened with his maintenance. Mr Taylor however, not discouraged, repeated his offer, and with the same result.

At the meeting of the York Agricultural Society in July 1851, Taylor responded to a toast to the yeoman of Western Australia. "He said that he was proud to call himself one of that class; he came to Western Australia with no other capital than his hands, but by sticking to work, he had succeeded in getting a little stock around him. Let those abuse Western Australia that would; it was a place for a poor man, and there was no reason why every other labouring man might not be in a similar position to himself." (Note: Taylor also responded in 1859.)

== Loss of his son ==
On 15 July 1854, Taylor's son, George, died from burns, as reported in the Perth Gazette:

A melancholy accident happened on Saturday last at Yangedine near York. Some men clearing for Mr Taylor, had a large fire burning up the rubbish, round which Mr Taylor's little boy was playing heedless of repeated warnings not to go near it, unfortunately the fire caught the little fellows frock and he running towards home was soon enveloped in flames, which completely burnt the whole of his clothes, leaving nothing but his waistband and wrist bands, and so much injuring him that he died in a few hours afterwards.

== Trip to England ==
In 1855, Taylor purchased the York town lot on which Settlers House was later to be built. He paid £10 for a Crown Grant on 25 July 1855. In August 1855, he was one of five appointed at a public meeting in York to represent the inhabitants of the York district at a public meeting to be held in Perth, the others all being substantial land owners.

The coming of convicts brought prosperity to servants who were flock owners, as Janet Millett says: (Note: This is a likely reference to Taylor: An Australian Parsonage, page 118.)

Thus, during the long period of utter stagnation which fell upon this unfortunate colony after its ill-managed foundation, many of the servants had become flock-owners and cattle-breeders, while most of their former masters had been ruined. The servants were therefore in a position to share in the advantages of the artificial life which was breathed into Swan River by the introduction of convicts in 1850, when a sheep, which but a short time before had been worth only eighteenpence, rose suddenly in price to a guinea, and every other description of farm produce acquired a fictitious value.

In October 1855, Taylor announced he was selling his "magnificent, thorough-bred" horse Flos Collium because he was about to leave the Colony for England. (Note: Taylor called on everyone who owed him money to settle by 15 February 1856, indicating he was to depart after that date.)

Taylor was "amongst the individuals who profited most by the colony becoming a penal settlement, and, on finding himself a rich man, he visited England for the purpose of assisting his relations at home". (Note: An Australian Parsonage, page 120.) He then returned to Western Australia on 19 February 1857 on board the Lady Amherst, bringing with him several of his brothers and sisters. (Note: In An Australian Parsonage, Janet Millett reports he brought back fourteen relations, page 120.)

Taylor became active in York affairs including the York Agricultural Society. (Note: Taylor joined a committee of the York Agricultural Society on 7 March 1857.) (Note: Taylor proposed a resolution requesting free female immigrants rather than female convicts at a public meeting on 6 June 1857.) (Note: Taylor seconded a resolution of the society for a prize for the best blood horse.) (Note: Taylor seconded a motion for a maximum price for horses found.) (Note: Taylor became a member of a committee for the construction of a bridge across the Avon River.) (Note: He signed a petition opposing proposed legislation to abolish sales by auction.) He introduced a new breed of cart horse.

In December 1857, a hut and a 30-acre (12 ha) part of wheat field, worth £200 to £300, was destroyed by a bush fire. In 1859, A ticket of leave man called John Cooper passed a cheque in his name for £15 and was prosecuted and Taylor gave evidence.

In 1860, he sold the Settlers House property to Henry Stevens (Note: A blacksmith and former convict who had his shop on the lot to the north.) for £40. At the time it was a vacant site. He purchased Yangedine for £2,000, with a £1,000 cash deposit and discharged the balance within 14 years. He was wheat growing, wool growing and pig keeping. He urged tobacco farming, but by gardeners not farmers.

He gave an interview in 1889 at which he spoke of this time:

...My principal work was wheat growing, wool growing and pig keeping. I used to sell my wheat by barter and for a long time I never saw a pound note and rarely saw any money at all. I took in the wheat very often on my own back, and got as much I could for it in the way of stores. The extortion of the store keepers is bad enough now, but it was terrible in those days. We had to give our wheat away for next to nothing and the greatest grievance of the squatters and farmers was at that time, and ought still to be, the extortion of the store men. I have lived here when I never knew what it was to have the taste of liquor or the possibility of getting it for a whole year at a time, when a pair of moleskin trousers cost me a sovereign, the price now being seven and sixpence, and at a time when I never had fresh meat, our only food being salt beef and pork from America which were charged at a feaful rate. Those were the days when the bushmen were swindled by the storekeepers. I have had to wade over fords and then often to swim with a sack of wheat in order to get stores in 'barter'.

He "once drove his team for many miles upon a day that the sun-heat stood at 145°F. 'I started,' he said, 'in the morning with four bay horses, but as the day went on, they became so covered with foam that I seemed to be driving white ones.'" (Note: An Australian Parsonage, p.176.)

He was soon operating on a large scale, employing 15 reapers for his 1866 harvest, and nine years later advertised for a team to shear his flock of 15,000 sheep. He later purchased another property Walwalling and a third. He and Ann had 10 children.

== Later years ==
From 8 January 1866, he was advertising his "very extensive steam flour mill" at 9d a bushel. (Note: Refer to An Australian Parsonage p. 120.) He also advertised "several very good sheep runs, containing 70,000 acres" for sale or let. He also advertised for a miller and engineer for the flour mill, and 14 or 15 good reapers, offering high wages. He also purchased a harvester "which reaps and threshes at the same time", something that was "beyond the reach of the small farmer".

His method of fencing was novel. "In December 1866 he called for tenders for ten miles of fencing on his estate, and specified that it was to be built from 'Jam trees cut down and laid at rights angles to the boundaries of the land: to be filled up sufficiently close to keep in sheep."

In 1868, Taylor led the movement to bring a railway line to York.

Taylor's operation was described as "large and progressive". In 1876, he visited the Eastern Colonies and returned with "...a number of very fine sheep of the long-woolled Lincoln breed". "Three years later, anticipating lot feeding by over a century, this innovative producer was experimenting with yarding a few head of cattle and feeding them hay" "to fatten them for the butcher".

Taylor's wife Ann died on 19 January 1884 and Taylor married a school-teacher, Rebecca Pyke, daughter of Joseph Pyke. (Note: They had three children.)

On 20 January 1889, a fire broke out in one of the paddocks at Yangedine destroying a quantity of bush feed and some fencing. Several settlers in the locality rode to the fire and were successful in managing the flames.

After spending a total of £10,000 in improvements, he sold Yangedine to the Darlot brothers, and went to reside in a home in York called The Retreat.

== Death and dispute over a codicil ==
In 1890, Taylor stepped onto a brass peg which went through his foot. His foot became infected and he became seriously ill. As he was fading, he made a new will leaving specific assets to family members including his widow Rebecca. His widow was to receive their family home in York, The Retreat and two life policies, one for £500 and one for £1,000. After the will was made, he realised that he the insurance policy of £1000 was actually his wife's insurance policy, she had the home but no money and this needed fixing. He needed to do a codicil and make some additional bequests. So he asked the Rev. George to arrange for a codicil to leave the residue of his estate to his wife.

On the day of signing, Taylor had lost so much strength that he could not sign the codicil. He held the pen in his hand but could not write. He tried again but could not sign. So one of the witnesses, Mr Iles, guided his hand as he made his signature and then signed as a witness. Then he asked for some whiskey which was given to him, after which he fell asleep. His condition became worse and he died 18 days later.

The executors failed to register the codicil, registering only the original will. So his widow had to commence proceedings to enforce the codicil. The case was held before a judge and a jury of six. Numerous witnesses gave evidence as to whether or not he understood what the codicil was all about. After the trial, the jury could not reach a decision.

The costs of the trial exceeded £800, one of the most expensive court actions to that time in Western Australia. To avoid another trial, the disputing sides of the family worked out a deal and settled the matter, with four fifths of the residuary estate going to the widow and the balance going to his children.

During the trial, Stephen Henry Parker QC said of Taylor:

"....no doubt the jury had all heard the name of John Taylor, of Yangedine. He was one of the oldest and most respected colonists. He was well-known and his place was almost a household word. Happily he did very well in his business as a grazier, farmer, miller, and otherwise, and became possessed of a considerable amount of property."
