= Kenneth Brown (pastoralist) =

Australian explorer and pastoralist

Kenneth Brown (9 August 1837 – 10 June 1876) was an explorer and pastoralist in Western Australia. He was hanged in 1876 for murdering his second wife Mary Ann Brown (née Tindall).

== Early life ==
Brown was born in Oxfordshire, England in 1837, the eldest son of Thomas Brown and Eliza Brown and older brother of Maitland Brown. In 1840, the Brown family emigrated to Western Australia, arriving in March 1841. They initially settled at York. In 1850, the family took up land in the Champion Bay area, where they established Glengarry. However, the following year his father was appointed to an official position as magistrate in Fremantle, and the family moved there, all except for Brown who stayed to manage Glengarry.

During the 1850s, Brown spent most of his time at Glengarry. He was often the only family member there and he eventually was responsible for its management. Although primarily a sheep station, the Browns developed a passion and industry for horse breeding. Over time, Glengarry became one of the most successful racehorse breeding establishments in the colony for thoroughbred race horses and cavalry re-mounts that were sold to India.

== Exploring expeditions ==
Brown undertook a number of exploring expeditions between 1852 and 1863. In 1852, he explored the country behind Glengarry with Major Logue. Two years later, in 1854 he participated in the Greenough Bootenal Springs confrontation between local settlers and Aborigines, soon after that he was included as a member of Robert Austin's expedition of 1854. On that expedition, he shot and collected the type specimen of the Australian night parrot (Pezoporus occidentalis) on break-away ranges north west of Mount Magnet near Mount Farmer. In 1859, he explored the higher reaches of the Murchison River with William Dalgety Moore to look for new land. In June 1862, he again explored up the Murchison, this time with Thomas Burges.

In 1863, Brown was part of an expedition to the Glenelg River. The explorers also included the naturalist Dr James Martin, Brown's brother Aubrey, Samuel Hamersley, and B. D. Clarkson, and was financed by a group of pastoralists including Brown and his brother, Hamersley, and L. C. Burges senior. The following year, Brown and other people associated with the expedition sued Burges and others, seeking money they believed was owed to them. The case was eventually settled out of court.

== First marriage ==
In 1859, Brown married Mary Eliza Dircksey Wittenoom. They had four surviving children (Blanche, Edith, Forrest, and Clarence). Mary died in 1868 during child birth.

== Failed partnership with his brothers ==
In June 1863, while away on the Glenelg River expedition, Brown's father died, and the brothers formed a partnership under which they managed Glengarry – Messrs K, A & M Brown. Over the next decade, the Champion Bay area suffered severely from drought, wheat rust and sheep scab. By 1871, Glengarry was heavily mortgaged and running at a loss.

== Second marriage and murder ==
While in Melbourne, Brown married Mary Ann Tindall (born 1849). They re-located to New Zealand and for some time operated the Courthouse Hotel in Thames (outside of Auckland). In the years 1874 and 1875, they had two children, Rose and Amy. In Thames, Brown showed a range of anti-social behavior that included two court appearances for assault on a local shop keeper and threatening to kill his wife. The family returned to Western Australia in September 1875, by which time the marriage was in trouble, and there are a range of further references to them constantly and openly quarrelling. On their return journey from Melbourne to Fremantle, the couple had a physical altercation that was witnessed by John Forrest. The couple and their children arrived in Champion Bay in October 1875. During this time, Brown continued to show a range of anti-social behaviours, and, on Monday 3 January 1876, during the process of packing up their house to move to other accommodation, he shot his wife dead.

== Trial and execution ==
At trial, he elected not to provide any explanation or excuse for his actions and his legal team mounted a defence based on diminished responsibility. The prosecution succeeded in proving the charge at the third trial (the first two trials resulting in hung juries). Brown was found guilty of wilful murder and sentenced to death by the Chief Justice Archibald Burt and hanged on 10 June 1876 at Perth Gaol. The record of inquest proclaimed by Police Magistrate E Landor states that Brown died by hanging.

== Rumors of survival ==
Many years later, Rose Burges, the eldest daughter of Brown's second marriage, claimed that while travelling in America she had met her father in a hotel. Because of this, a story persists that Brown's older brother had arranged Brown's escape to the United States. This is considered as improbable, and there is a newspaper report describing how Maitland Brown stood next to Brown on the platform when the bolt was drawn and that Brown's body had to be cut free from the rope and was later buried by relatives, possibly at Guildford (where his mother resided at the time).

== Legacy ==
Brown's second child by his first marriage was Edith Cowan (née Brown). Edith's grandson was Peter Cowan, a celebrated Western Australian author who wrote detailed biographies on Maitland Brown and Edith Cowan. Julie Lewis has suggested that Brown's life and death:

is to some extent responsible for Peter Cowan's biographical method and also the motivating force behind some of his fiction. The effect of isolation, of a hostile environment, of grief and emotional deprivation on a person's spirit and the ways in which an individual reacts to these things - mostly in control, but occasionally showing uncharacteristic violence – are recurring themes – for example – "The Empty Street" – a man driven by unseen forces reacts with violence.
