= An Australian Parsonage or, the Settler and the Savage in Western Australia =

1872 social commentary on Western Australia in the 1860s by Janet Millett

An Australian Parsonage
- Author: Janet Millett
- Genre: Social commentary
- Publication date: 1872

An Australian Parsonage, or the Settler and the Savage in Western Australia (1872) is an account of life in Western Australia, particularly York, written by Janet Millett, the wife of clergyman Edward Millett, who was the priest of Holy Trinity Church, York from late 1863 until early 1869. It has been described as one of three outstanding books by early settlers, who commented on 19th-century Australian life. (Note: The other two were The Bushman by Edward Wilson Landor and Australia and New Zealand (1873) by Anthony Trollope.)

== Writing ==
The book was “founded on a diary kept by the writer” while she was in Western Australia. Her husband, Edward, contributed some of the “latter chapters”.

== Publication ==
The book was published in January 1872 by Edward Stanford, 6 & 7 Charing Cross, London.

== Contents ==
The book contains “graphic sketches of the writer’s own experiences as a chaplain’s wife, during five years spent in Western Australia”. The book includes comments on

- The journey from Fremantle to York
- Life and personalities of York
- The difficulties of housekeeping
- Bushfires
- The summer heat
- The Aboriginal inhabitants
- Convicts
- Pensioner guards
- The sandalwood trade
- Publicans and storekeepers
- The truck system.

An index to the book is on website of The York Society. According to The York Society, some of the unnamed persons in the book may be as follows:

- The Irish priest on board ship on page 14 is Fr Matthew Gibney
- The Yorkshire lady on pages 9, 10, 32 and 33 is Mary Dinsdale
- The shoemaker on page 247 is likely to be her husband William Dinsdale Snr
- The French convict on page 250 is Aimable Duperouzel
- The settler on pages 118 to 120 and on page 176 must be John Taylor
- The schoolmaster on pages 405-406 was probably John William Veal.

== Reviews ==
The book was reviewed 60 times in 1872 and in the following years, was cited as an important source of information and a valuable insight into the way of life in York at the time.
