= Duperouzel =

Duperouzel is a surname. Notable people with the surname include:

- Aimable Duperouzel (1831–1901), French-born convict transported to Western Australia
- Bruce Duperouzel (born 1950), Australian rules footballer and cricketer
- Gary Duperouzel, Australian cricket umpire
