= Janet Millett =

Writer about life in Western Australia in the 1860s

- Janet Millett 1863
- Born: Janet Webster; 17 July 1821; Sutton Coldfield
- Died: 6 October 1904 (aged 83); Biggleswade
- Resting place: Biggleswade Cemetery, Section 5, Plot 2308
- Occupations: Writer, artist
- Spouse: Rev. Edward Millett
- Writing career
- Subject: Life in Western Australia
- Notable works: An Australian Parsonage or, the Settler and the Savage in Western Australia.

Janet Millett (1821–1904) was an English writer about life in Western Australia in the 1860s, best known for her book An Australian Parsonage or, the Settler and the Savage in Western Australia.

== Early years ==
She was born Janet Webster in Sutton Coldfield, Warwickshire, on 17 July 1821. She was the fourth of nine children of Joseph Webster and Maria Mary Payne. (Note: Maria Mary was a daughter of Sir Peter Payne (1762-1843) MP, 3rd Baronet Payne of St Christopher's.) (Note: The 1851 Census for Sutton Coldfield shows that two of Joseph and Maria’s children, Janet, aged 29 years, and Maria, aged 38 years, were living at Ashfurlong Hall, Four Oaks, Sutton Coldfield.)

The Websters were a Presbyterian family who operated a blade mill in Perry Barr, Birmingham, from the 1740s and later developed a wire drawing business at Perry Mills. The business flourished from 1842 under the stewardship of Baron Dickinson Webster, Janet’s older brother. In 1859 Baron amalgamated the business with that of James Horsfall, the inventor of patent steel wire. The Websters specialised in exporting piano wire to Continental Europe and Horsfall specialised in high-tensile wire used in the manufacturing of needles and other items. Baron was successful in the production of the first transatlantic telegraph cable in 1866 which was laid by the ship SS Great Eastern designed by Isambard Kingdom Brunel, and became a man of prominence.

Janet, aged 32, married a Church of England clergyman, the Reverend Edward Millett, aged 29, in St Saviour’s Church in the Manor of Tor Mohun, Devon, on 31 March 1853. Edward was the son of George Millett, a clergyman, and Elizabeth Amelia Agnew and was born in Bovingdon, Hertfordshire, on 23 May 1824. He graduated from Trinity College, Cambridge with a B.A. in 1847. He followed in his father’s footsteps and was ordained a deacon on 15 June 1851 and became a priest on 6 June 1852.

Edward Millett was the curate of St Andrew's Church in Glaston, Rutland. The couple later lived in Wales where Edward was the curate at St Mary's Church, Pembroke.

Janet and Edward may have been influenced to go to Australia by having attended the International Exhibition of 1862 where Australia was one of 36 countries represented. They would have seen an impressive collection of Western Australian products and artefacts on display and have studied the descriptive catalogue. The couple’s decision to go to Western Australia was due to Edward’s ill health for he suffered from a condition called tic douloureux. This was a terribly painful neurological disorder which caused convulsive face-twitching for which he took morphine to relieve the pain. It was hoped the warmer climate would go some way to improve Edward’s health.

In 1863, Edward accepted the position as colonial chaplain of the Holy Trinity Church, York, Western Australia.

== Arrival in Western Australia ==
Janet and Edward left England on board the ship Tartar on 26 August 1863 and arrived in Fremantle 110 days later, on 13 December 1863. In her book, Janet describes her sensation of pleasure at seeing Rottnest Island off the coast of Fremantle for the first time knowing it was only a matter of a few more hours before the Tartar would arrive in the town. Her pleasure was somewhat tinged with sadness, however, as she later reflects with compassion on the death of an emigrant’s child who died of illness and a sailor who drowned during the voyage.

Before saying goodbye to Fremantle, Janet gives a vivid description of the new town and the churches in chapter one of her book. They decided to travel to Perth by steamboat up the Swan River. Janet found the journey to her liking and described her first impressions of Perth, Mount Eliza, Perth Town Hall, Melville Water, Bishop's House, the Barracks of the Pensioner Force and Government House. She also described the fauna and flora which she clearly enjoyed.

Within a few weeks of their arrival Edward had preached at St George's Cathedral, Perth.

== Journey to York ==
Having accustomed themselves to life in the new Swan River Colony in Fremantle and Perth the couple set off on the journey to York to their new residence. Edward had set out from Perth before Janet who followed afterwards with one horse and a maidservant travelling in a hired dogcart, a light horse-drawn vehicle, driven by a convict. During the ninety-seven-kilometre (sixty-mile) journey through some inhospitable countryside she had friendly encounters with convicts and hounds. She also got to know a large variety of wild flowers, red-gum trees, eucalyptus trees and shrubs.

Before arriving in York and taking up residency at the parsonage, Janet stopped at the descent of Cut Hill where she had her first view of the ridge of Mount Brown, beneath which was the parsonage. (Note: Janet Millett calls this Mount Douraking.)

== Life in York ==
Janet settled into her new life in York which she called Barladong, and became very well known throughout the district. In her book she describes the determination of free settlers and convicts to do well for themselves such as her fascinating story about a French convict who later bought land and did very well. (Note: The French convict is presumed to be Aimable Duperouzel.) Janet was not a scandal monger, so her stories in An Australian Parsonage gave no offence.

Janet was captivated by the Aboriginal Noongar people and she describes how they reacted to the new arrivals from Europe. She relates stories that reflect her compassionate nature. On one occasion she was summoned to see a sick Aboriginal friend, Kitty, who was gravely ill. Kitty, with much difficulty pronounced the words, "Will you take my little girl?". "Take Binnahan - make good". Within a few days Kitty passed away and Binnahan came to live with Janet and Edward. The couple were also welcoming to the Aboriginal man Khourabene who became a loyal friend, as evident by Janet’s frequent warm references to him in her book. She was keen to learn the Aboriginal vocabulary and discovered from Khourabene that the word ‘me-ul’ signified ‘an eye’.

Janet and Edward also enjoyed the companionship of some pet animals, amongst them was a kangaroo named ‘Jacky’; and a possum, or koomal as Aboriginal people called them, called Possie. Janet recalls the occasion when her husband’s strange pet called ‘Timothy’, a Mountain Devil, went missing. Much to the delight of Edward, young ‘Timothy’ was found by a boy and returned. She also helped with the rescue of a poor cow called ‘Mooley’, which had fallen into the river.

Janet was the second clergyman’s wife to accompany her husband to Western Australia in the early stages of the development of the Swan River Colony. The first to do so was Mary Wollaston, the wife of the Rev. John Ramsden Wollaston who was one of four missionaries who arrived at Fremantle in April 1841, some twenty years earlier. Mary’s journals and letters were never published in book form. (Note: The experiences of Mary and Janet, as wives of clergymen in the Swan River Colony, were recognised by Helen Walker Wallace in an address entitled, "Mrs Wollaston & Mrs Millett, pioneering wives of clergymen in Western Australia" which she delivered at the Holy Trinity Church on Sunday 15 September 2002. This was given in celebration of the ministry of Blessed John Ramsden Wollaston, Saint and Hero of the Church in the Province of Western Australia.)

Janet’s husband visited the convict hiring depots and ticket-of-leave men as part of his role as pastor. He also joined in with other local community events as evident by a lecture he gave after a tea-meeting in the Mechanics’ Hall in 1866. (Note: Earlier in 1866 an advertisement in the Inquirer and Commercial newspaper showed Janet’s husband was listed as a member of the District Committee for York and Beverley. "Messrs. Walkinshaw. Cowan, (Chairman), S. E. Burges, S. S. Parker, Dr. McCoy, Augustus Lee Steere and Rev. E. Millett.")

== Vilification towards Janet's husband ==
Janet was deeply troubled after years of hostility and innuendoes towards her husband from Walkinshaw Cowan, Resident Magistrate of York and Beverley, whose vilification started soon after the couple’s arrival in York. Cowan also withheld stipends due to Edward for his visits to the York Convict Depot, convict road parties and ticket-of-leave men to tend to their welfare needs.

The medication her husband was taking for his neuralgia sometimes resulted in unsteadiness but Cowan deduced from their first meeting that he was a heavy drinker. He therefore conducted a campaign against Edward with the intention of driving him from York and accused Edward of "drunkenness, laziness, general moral delinquency and a diminished sense of responsibility". Edward eventually wrote to the Colonial Secretary to request an official open inquiry to clear his name. An inquiry followed in York in October 1866, comprising Bishop Hale, the Principal Medical Officer in Perth and Magistrate Edward Wilson Landor, who found in Edward’s favour. Most parishioners supported and respected their minister and no evidence of neglect was found. (Note: Janet avoided causing any offence in her book by not mentioning any reference to Walkinshaw Cowan’s clash with her husband, nor did she mention Edward’s health affliction.)

Edward’s health did not improve and he resigned as colonial chaplain in July 1868 to return to England.

== Return to England ==
Janet and Edward boarded Bridgetown at Fremantle bound for England on 11 January 1869. However, one special memory for Janet to treasure was her favourite spot, which she called Mount Douraking, where she enjoyed taking a party of children into the bush to gather wild flowers called everlastings. (Note: This is Mount Brown, York, which contemporary Barladong Noongar people call ‘Wongborel’.)

Well wishes for their return journey to England were evident in a brief extract taken from an article by a York Correspondent featured in The Inquirer & Commercial News a few days before the Bridgetown sailed from Fremantle, "…I cannot allow Edward to leave the colony without wishing both himself and his no less amiable wife, Janet, every blessing they can desire, and a safe and pleasant voyage to their fatherland. I sincerely trust the change may be conducive of a perfect restoration of the Rev. gentleman’s now delicate health…".

After their arrival in Britain, Janet and Edward were living in Wales following Edward’s appointment as curate at St Tudwal’s Church, Llanstadwell, Pembrokeshire, from October 1869. The couple then moved to Kimmeridge, Dorset, in June 1870 where Edward took up an appointment as curate of St Nicholas Church. Janet and Edward were living in the parsonage adjacent to St Nicholas Church. Whilst at Kimmeridge, Janet used her journals, diaries and notes of her time in York to write her book An Australian Parsonage, showing a special interest in the Aboriginal Noongar people and their customs and on many other topical subjects. She also wrote two articles at the invitation of Anne MacKenzie the editor for a London missionary magazine, The Net Cast in Many Waters; Sketches from The Life of Missionaries, regarding missionary schools for Aboriginal children in Western Australia.

In 1873 Janet and Edward left Kimmeridge for Gautby, Lincolnshire, where Edward took on the role as rector of All Saints Church. After four years of pastoral service there Edward died on 4 January 1876, aged 51 years, and was buried in the churchyard. They did not have any children. (Note: The Will of Edward indicates that Edward's personal effects were worth less than £200.00 when Probate was granted to Janet at Lincoln on 24 February 1876.) (Note: A short notice appeared in a Perth newspaper, The Inquirer and Commercial News, on 8 March 1876, to inform readers of the death of Janet’s husband in England.) Crockford's Clerical Directory of the clergy of the Church of England, the Church in Wales, the Scottish Episcopal Church and the Church of Ireland includes an entry for Edward showing where he served prior to his time in Gautby.

== Janet Millett after 1876 ==
Five years after the death of her husband Janet, aged 59, was living at 26 College Road, Brighton with her cousin, Amelia Travers. Janet’s occupation is recorded as "Income Derived From Mortgages". In 1886 she moved to Biggleswade in Bedfordshire, to Richmond Villa, 52 The Baulk. The 1891 and 1901 Janet was living at Richmond Villa on Cemetery Road, and her occupation was recorded as "Living on her own means".

Millett died on 6 October 1904, aged 83, and was buried in the Drove Road Cemetery, Biggleswade, on 10 October 1904. A lengthy death notice was printed in the Ampthill & District News, dated 15 October 1904, pays tribute to her, stating that she would be much missed by the poor, to whom she was most charitable and sympathetic during her 18 years in Biggleswade.

Millet's Last Will reads,"…the personal effects of Janet Millett of the Baulk were valued at £1,980.19s.10d. for Probate and these effects were left to her niece, Louisa Janet Webster, spinster…".

== Publications ==
Janet’s book, An Australia Parsonage or, the Settler and the Savage in Western Australia was published by Edward Stanford, London, in January 1872. Advance copies of the book were made available to selected bookshops as early as December 1871. Glowing book reviews were printed in numerous newspapers and magazines throughout the United Kingdom and Australia during 1872. At least 60 known book reviews for An Australian Parsonage were published in newspapers in England, Wales, Scotland and Ireland from the end of 1871 into 1872. Most reviews occupied many column inches and were consistent in their praise for Janet’s vivid description of her life experiences as the wife of an English clergyman during the five years the couple lived in York. Similarly, in Australia, well over 30 reviews were printed in 1872, in Western Australia, South Australia, New South Wales and Victoria.

Janet also wrote two articles at the invitation of the editor of a London missionary magazine called The Net Cast in Many Waters; Sketches from The Life of Missionaries. Both articles ended with an appeal to readers to send assistance to the editor, Anne MacKenzie, to help support the new Aboriginal Institute, Perth.

Janet’s first article "West Australian Natives", published in two parts in October 1872, and November 1872, describes the relationship Janet and Edward had with the local Aboriginal Noongar people and her impressions of their way of life. This article concludes with reference to the work of the recently established Mission School for Aboriginal children within the Bishop See, Perth. Her friend, Miss Shepherd, the late mistress of the Girls’ School in York was entrusted with the role of matron and superintendent of this new Mission School.

Janet’s second article, "School Life in West Australia", printed in The Net in October 1873, Janet writes on behalf of Miss Shepherd about everyday life at the Mission School as Miss Shepherd was forced to return home to England in 1873 due to ill health. It is evident Janet and Miss Shepherd kept in contact after Miss Shepherd returned home for Janet and Miss Shepherd sent a donation of £2.00 towards the purchase of a Lectern for St George’s Cathedral, Perth, in March 1879.

== Legacy ==
An Australian Parsonage is of cultural and historical importance to those researching the early history of Western Australia. In England, it was of particular value as a guide to those seeking to emigrate to Western Australia as Janet describes a vast range of topics from settlers and convicts to animals and plants. The book is of special importance to the community of York as she reminisces about the people of the town and her everyday experiences in the 1860s.

To commemorate the 150th anniversary of York as the oldest inland town in Western Australia a facsimile edition of An Australian Parsonage was printed in 1980 by the University of Western Australia Press, UWA Publishing, with an introduction written by Rica Erickson.

Janet is held in high esteem throughout the community in York. In recognition of her contribution, the Shire of York named a road after her, Janet Millett Lane, which runs by the Holy Trinity Church. (Note: In 1962 the importance of Janet’s book was recognised nationally in Australia when an image of Government House, Perth, was chosen from her book to feature in the calendar of the National Bank of Australasia.)

Janet was also an artist. The painting of the Holy Trinity Church, York, Western Australia is after a watercolour by her and adorns the jacket of the facsimile edition of her book printed in 1980. (Note: Janet was recognised as a watercolourist and writer in a book of biographies of famous Australian artists written by Joan Kerr. Joan’s book, The Dictionary of Australian Artists, Painters, Sketchers, Photographers and Engravers to 1870 was published in 1992. This biography of Janet draws reference to the many paintings she did whilst in York and shows an image of the painting of the Holy Trinity Church. Joan also refers to another watercolour painting by Janet, of a mountain landscape scene. Janet was honoured to be featured with a biography in another book by Joan Kerr entitled, Heritage. The National Women’s Art Book: 500 works by 500 Australian Women from Colonial Times to 1955.) (Note: In recognition of Janet’s contribution to the townsfolk of York a play, "Mrs Millett", was commissioned and performed by the York Theatre Group in Holy Trinity Church on 6 November 1981. An article and photograph of the cast and players were featured in The West Australian newspaper on 5 November 1981.)
