= Residency Museum, York =

Residency Museum
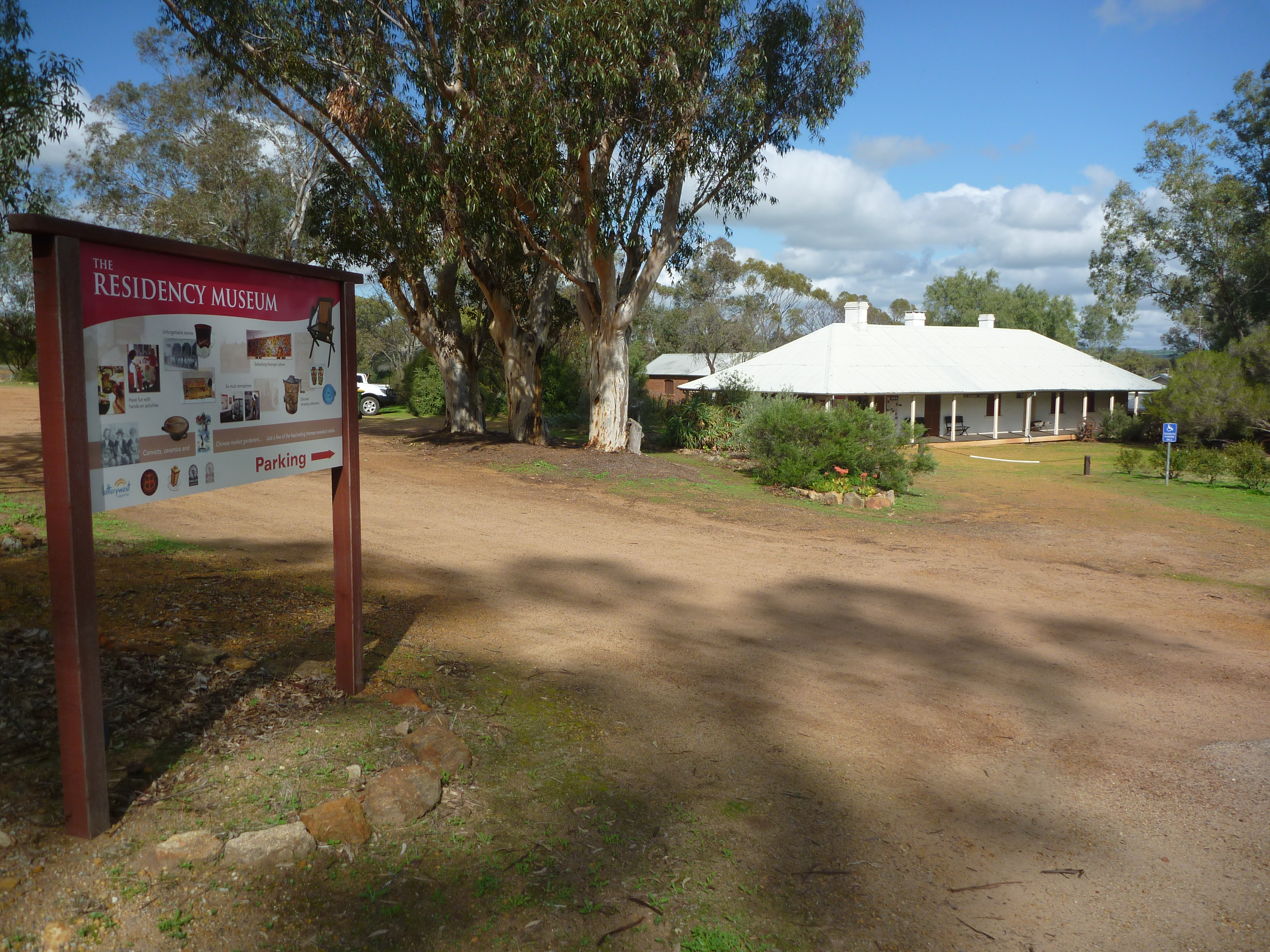
- Residency Museum, York, in 2019
- Interactive map of the Residency Museum area

General information
- Location: 4 Brook St, York, Western Australia
- Coordinates: 31°53′34″S 116°46′31″E
- Construction started: 1852

Western Australia Heritage Register
- Type: State Registered Place
- Designated: 9 February 1996
- Reference no.: 2870

References
- York municipal inventory

The Residency Museum in York, Western Australia is a single-storey, heritage-listed building in the Victorian Georgian style. It is associated with the also heritage-listed Old York Hospital.

== The Residency ==
Built around 1852 as a cottage housing the Depot Superintendent, this building is now the last remaining part of York's Convict Depot.

The oldest section was built from hand-made bricks that bore the stamp of the broad arrow, meaning they were the property of the Crown, but which came to represent structures constructed by convicts.

In the 1860s the cottage was occupied by the medical officer attached to the Depot Hospital, Dr Robert McCoy. In 1867, after several complaints to the colonial governor about the lack of suitable official accommodation for himself and his family, Resident Magistrate Walkinshaw Cowan moved from his property at Mile Pool to the cottage. During his tenancy, the cottage was extended to accommodate his large family and became known as The Residency.

After the Old York Hospital, located on the adjacent site, was constructed in 1896, it did not have the space to provide a maternity hospital and the building was adapted for this use. As a maternity hospital, the building accommodated a maternity and labour ward, nurses' bed/sitting room, duty room and in the adjoining structure, a store, kitchen and maid's room.

In 1926, a bathroom, toilet and new verandah were added to the northern wall of the central court and the building became the Matron's Quarters.

The building continued to be used as part of the Old York Hospital complex until 1963 when a new hospital and nurses' quarters were built in York.

The building was unoccupied and neglected until the early 1970s, when the building was saved from disrepair by the efforts of The York Society which raised $6,000 to have the building preserved and it became The Residency Museum. The funds were used for restoration. "Temporary additions and lean-tos were removed and the building renovated as nearly as possible to [its state] when Walkinshaw Cowan was Resident Magistrate in the 1860s."

== The Residency Museum ==
The building opened as a Municipal Museum in 1972, managed by the Shire of York, with help from community volunteers.

The Residency Museum houses early colonial artefacts and has changing exhibitions.
