= Old York Hospital =

Building in York, Western Australia

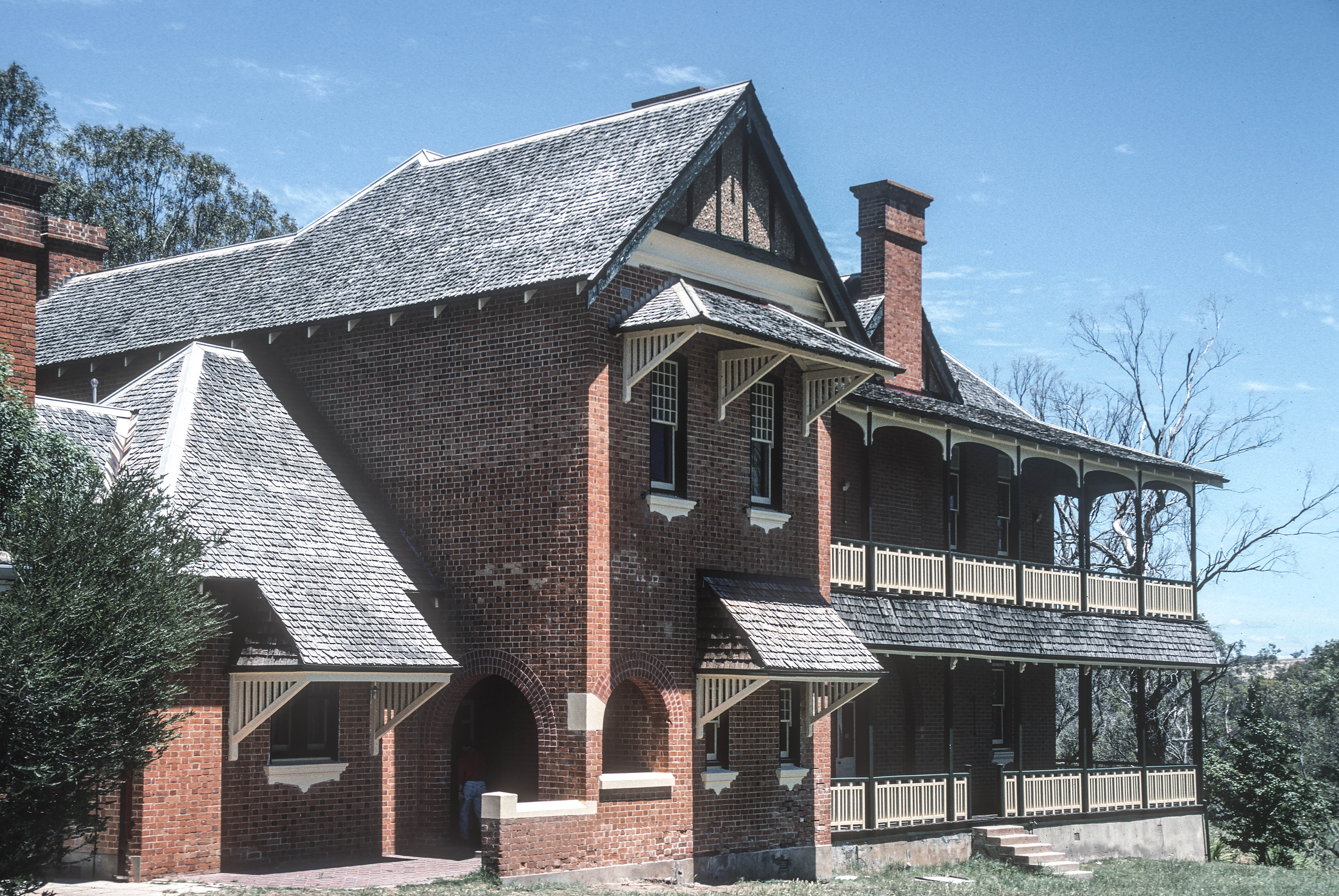
- Old York Hospital in 2015
- Interactive map of the Old York Hospital area

General information
- Location: Brook Street, York, Western Australia
- Coordinates: 31°53′35″S 116°46′29″E
- Opened: June 1896; 130 years ago

Western Australia Heritage Register
- Official name: Old York Hospital
- Type: State Registered Place
- Designated: 17 May 1996
- Reference no.: 2869
- Municipality: Shire of York

Register of the National Estate
- Official name: York Hospital
- Type: Historic
- Designated: 21 March 1978
- Reference no.: 10007
- Place File Number: 5/07/121/0001

References
- York municipal inventory

The Old York Hospital is a two-storey building constructed in 1896, to provide improved hospital facilities for the township of York, Western Australia and the surrounding district. Other buildings on the site include the former morgue, the former laundry (1942), the former nurses' quarters (1925), and the former maternity block (1941).

== History ==
The hospital building replaced an earlier hospital which had been part of the York Convict Hiring Depot (1852), which was a hospital for men only.

The hospital was built by Christie and Company for a cost of £2,267/19/6.

The first matron was Mary Ann Nicholas, the last matron of the Perth Colonial Hospital. Her staff consisted of a nurse, cook, orderly and wardsmaid. In the first year, 65 patients were admitted. When necessary, surgery was carried out on the kitchen table.

There was an urgent need at the time for hospitals in the Avon Valley:

York was one of the Avon Valley towns which had to cope with the increasing number of men being brought from the Eastern Goldfields for medical care and treatment. The harsh and primitive conditions on the fields led to much loss of life and serious illness. Lack of potable water and inadequate hygiene in the first years, caused outbreaks of typhoid fever and dysentery, while the scarcity of fresh vegetables and other vital foodstuffs caused widespread scurvy and other diet deficiency sickness. Until hospitals could be built at Southern Cross, Coolgardie and Kalgoorlie, the sick men were often transported to the nearest township for medical treatment, and in all the towns of the Avon Valley, new hospitals were urgently needed.

The roof, originally shingled with hand-split she-oak shingles, was re-shingled in 1935.

When the hospital closed in 1963, it was used as the Civil Defence Headquarters and then sold to the United Department of Christian Education (Methodist Church) which called the building Mirrambeena House. It was then sold to the National Trust in April 1976, and the building was restored under the guidance of architect John Pidgeon, and leased to the Youth Community Recreation and National Fitness Council and was used as a youth hostel. The Youth Hostels Association ceased to use the building in 1995 and it is now a private residence.

== Arts and Crafts design ==
The hospital is a fine example of Federation Arts and Crafts design in Western Australia, being designed by Principal Architect George Temple-Poole. The building "gives the impression rather of a Victorian gentleman's mansion than a government institution".

It has an English derived look with its high pitched gables, but an Australian and tropical touch is imparted by the wide verandahs, which extend across both storeys at front and back.”

The hospital building has some features of Red House, Bexleyheath in the south of London, the home designed by William Morris, one of the founders of the Arts and Crafts movement; for example the fact that the roof over the main entrance porch “comes down low and asymmetrically as part of the main roof”. Other Arts and Crafts features include:

- Prominent eaves with exposed brackets
- Local materials (brick)
- Steeply pitched roof
- Tall chimneys
- Gables
- Archway on the left
- Informal window arrangement

== See also ==
- Residency Museum, York
