= Australian fifty-dollar note =

Current denomination of Australian currency

Fifty Dollars
- Country: Australia
- Value: $50 Australian dollars
- Width: 151 mm
- Height: 65 mm
- Security features: Window, Watermark
- Material used: Polymer
- Years of printing: 1995–99, 2003–14, 2016, 2018, 2020–21, 2023

Obverse
- Design: David Unaipon
- Designer: emerystudio
- Design date: 15 February 2018

Reverse
- Design: Edith Cowan
- Designer: emerystudio
- Design date: 15 February 2018

The Australian fifty-dollar note is an Australian banknote with a face value of fifty Australian dollars ($50). Since 1995 it has been a polymer banknote featuring portraits of Edith Cowan, first female member of an Australian parliament, and inventor and Australia's first published Aboriginal Australian author, David Unaipon. The $50 banknote is also called a "pineapple" given its bright yellow colour.

== 1973–1995 ==
There was no fifty-dollar note released as part of the initial rollout of decimal currency in 1966, but inflation necessitated its introduction seven years later in 1973. The original paper fifty-dollar note released on Tuesday 9 October 1973, designed by Gordon Andrews, has a scientific theme. On the front of the note is a portrait of Australian pathologist Howard Walter Florey, Baron Florey and scenes of laboratory research. On the back is a portrait of Sir Ian Clunies Ross, veterinary scientist and first chairman of the CSIRO, along with scenes from the Australian environment.

The paper fifty-dollar note, circulated between 1973 and 1995.
The front of the note	The back of the note

== 1995–2018 ==
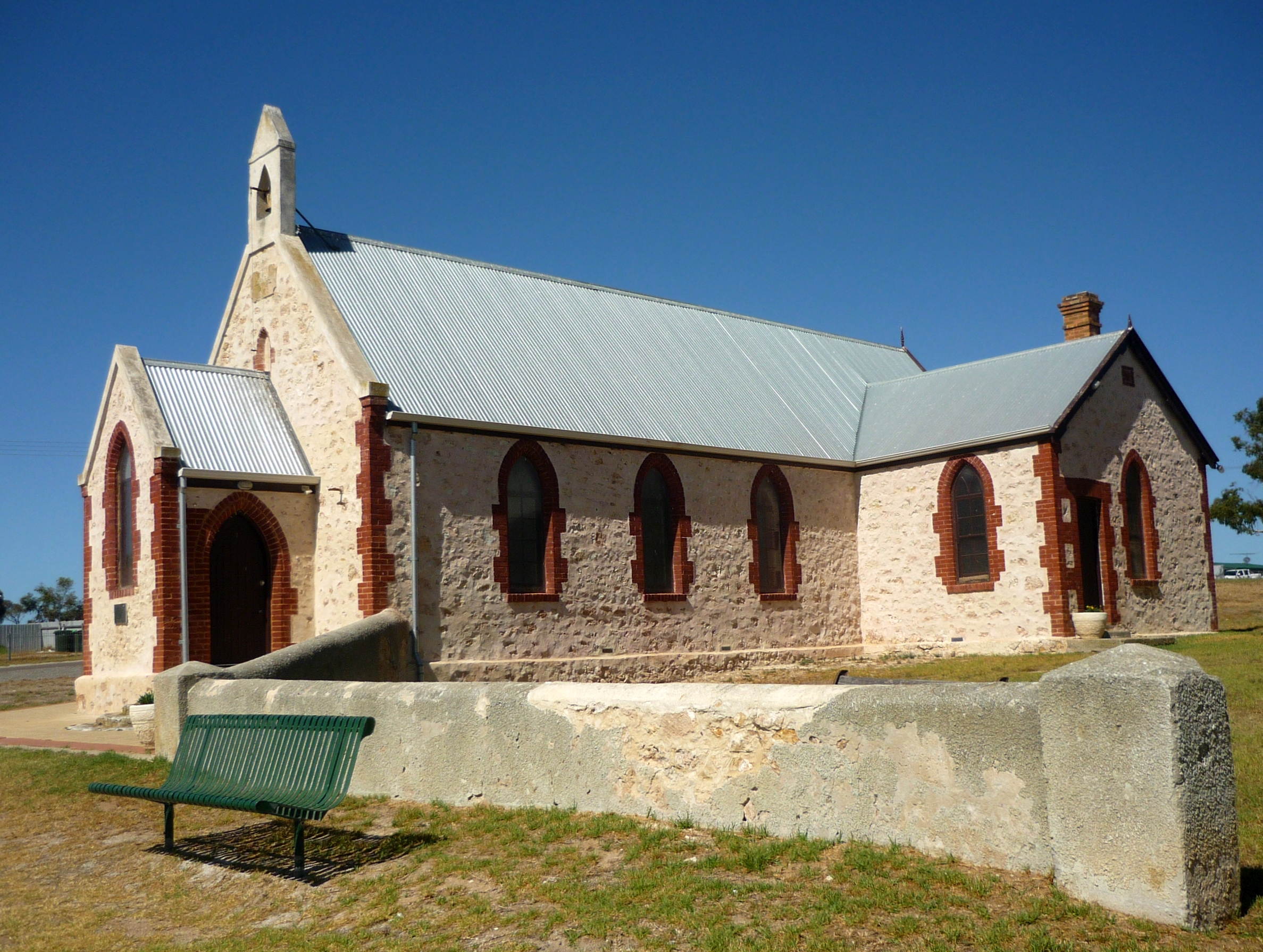
The church of Raukkan, South Australia is featured on the 1995 note

On Wednesday 4 October 1995 a polymer banknote was released. The new note was designed by Brian Sadgrove.

A portrait of Ngarrindjeri man David Unaipon, inventor and author of the first work published in Australia by an Aboriginal Australian, appears on the front, along with drawings from one of his inventions, and an extract from the original manuscript of his Legendary Tales of the Australian Aborigines. There is also a depiction of the Raukkan Church, a historical landmark in Raukkan, where Unaipon grew up on a mission then known as Point McLeay. The couple standing in front of the church are Polly and Milerum. Milerum was the last initiated member of the local Ngarrindjeri people. He was highly respected and played a huge role in the recording of history of the Ngarrindjeri people of the Coorong.

On the back is a portrait of Edith Cowan, first female member of any Australian parliament, along with a picture of Western Australia's original Parliament House, and an illustration of a foster mother and children.

In June 2017 there were 686 million $50 banknotes in circulation. Worth $34,309 million, this was 47% of the total value for all denominations.

The original polymer fifty-dollar note.
The front of the note	The back of the note

=== Design features ===
The handwritten statement on the obverse of the note reads "As a full-blooded member of my race I think I may claim to be the first—but I hope, not the last—to produce an enduring record of our customs, beliefs and imaginings". The word "Imaginings" is spelled incorrectly and was since corrected. (An alternative suggestion is that 'imaging' was originally used but later changed to 'imaginings' by David Unaipon as most would not understand his epistemological underpinnings of mimicry and assimilation)

=== Security features ===
With reference to the current polymer items, there is a clear window on the banknote with the Southern Cross star formation printed upon it, and the number "50" is also embossed in the clear window. There is also raised printing on the note.

A patch with the number "50" on the back of the banknote can be seen when held up to an ultraviolet light. There are two serial numbers on the banknote, one in black and blue, different fonts are used on each one, and the serial numbers glow under ultraviolet light.

There is also micro printing, in terms of "fifty dollars", and a shadow image of the Australian coat of arms when light is shown through it.

== 2018–present ==
On 27 September 2012, the Reserve Bank of Australia announced that Australia's banknotes would be upgraded in the coming years.

On 15 February 2018, the Reserve Bank of Australia unveiled the design of the new $50 banknote, after earlier releasing updated versions of the $5 and $10 polymer banknotes in September 2016 and September 2017 respectively. The note features updated security features, and was released into circulation on Thursday 18 October 2018. The artwork on the note, incorporating the work of Kaurna/Ngarrindjeri artist Muriel van der Byl AM, retains the portraits of Cowan and Unaipon.

A typographical error, the last "i" in "responsibility" being missing and spelled instead as "responsibilty", was discovered on earlier print runs of the banknote in May 2019, affecting 46 million banknotes. The Reserve Bank confirmed it had been aware of the error since December 2018, and corrected the spelling in later print runs. The affected notes remain in circulation and are still considered legal tender.
