= Peter Cowan (writer) =

Writer from Western Australia

Peter Cowan AM
- Born: November 4, 1914; Perth, Western Australia
- Died: June 6, 2002 (aged 87); Guildford, Western Australia
- Occupations: Novelist and short story writer

Peter Cowan AM (4 November 1914 – 6 June 2002) was a Western Australian writer, noted especially for his short stories.

== Biography ==
Born in 1914 in South Perth, Peter Walkinshaw Cowan was the son of Norman Walkinshaw Cowan and Marie Emily Johnston. His grandmother was Australia's first female parliamentarian, Edith Dircksey Cowan. He was descended from several Western Australian pioneering families, including the Browns of York, the Cowans and the Wittenooms.

After leaving Wesley College, Perth in 1930, Cowan worked in insurance and as a farm labourer before completing his matriculation at Perth Technical College and subsequently entering the University of Western Australia in 1938. After completing his teaching qualifications, he worked as a teacher at Wesley College.

He married Edie Howard and they had a son, Julian. The family moved to Melbourne in 1943 while Cowan was serving in the Royal Australian Air Force. While in Melbourne, he became involved in the Angry Penguins modernist literary movement.

After the war, Peter Cowan returned to Perth and taught English and Geography for many years at Scotch College. In 1964, he became a senior tutor in English at the University of Western Australia, and later an honorary research fellow after his retirement.

== Works ==
Peter Cowan published eight volumes of short stories, five novels and three biographies. He also edited two books of diaries and letters and co-edited seven volumes of short fiction.

His first published work was a short story, Living, published in Angry Penguins in 1943. Over the next twenty years, he continued to publish short stories.

He received a Commonwealth Literary Fund fellowship in 1963 to write his first novel, Summer. His other novels included Seed (1966), The Color of the Sky (1986) and The Hills of Apollo Bay (1989).

In later years, he was particularly active in recording his family's pioneering history in Western Australia. He wrote a biography of his grandmother Edith Dircksey Cowan, entitled A Unique Position (1978), and a biography of her uncle Maitland Brown (1988), as well as editing the letters of Eliza and Thomas Brown (A Faithful Picture, 1977), and the diary and reports of Walkinshaw Cowan (A Colonial Experience, 1978).

For many years, he was co-editor of the literary journal Westerly and wrote many articles and reviews for it.

His manuscripts and his extensive Australiana book collection are held in Special Collections in the University of Western Australia Library.

== Awards ==
Peter Cowan's novel The Color of the Sky won the Western Australian Premier's Book Award for Fiction and the Western Australia Week Literary Award in 1986.

In 1987, he was made a Member of the Order of Australia, and in 1992 he received the Patrick White Award for an Australian Writer of Great Distinction.

Edith Cowan University conferred its first Honorary Degree (Doctor of Philosophy) on Peter Cowan in 1995. In 1997, the Peter Cowan Writers' Centre was established at the Joondalup campus of Edith Cowan University, based in the reconstructed house of his grandmother.

He was named one of Western Australia's Living Treasures in 1999, and was awarded a Centenary Medal in 2001 for service to literature through writing.

== The Peter Cowan Short Story Competition ==
The Peter Cowan Short Story Competition was launched by the Peter Cowan Writers Centre in 2010, in honour of Peter Cowan. The competition involves the submission of stories of a maximum of 600 words, and is administered by the Peter Cowan Writers Centre in Joondalup, Western Australia.

== Selected bibliography ==
- 1944: Drift, short stories
- 1958: The Unploughed Land, novella and short stories (some reprinted from Drift)
- 1964: Summer, novel
- 1965: The Empty Street, novella and short stories
- 1966: Seed, novel
- 1973: The Tins, short stories
- 1979: Mobiles, short stories
- 1986: The Color of the Sky, novel
- 1986: A Window in Mrs X's Place, selected short stories from previous volumes
- 1988: Voices, short stories
- 1989: The Hills of Apollo Bay, novel
- 1994: The Tenants, novel
