= Eliza Brown (settler) =

Australian settler

Eliza Brown (1811 – 24 April 1896) was an early settler in colonial Western Australia whose letters to her father record the hardships of her family. She accompanied an exploration to Champion Bay in 1851, her account of the journey being published.

== Early years ==
Eliza was the daughter of William Bussey of Cuddesdon, South Oxfordshire, a "gentleman of considerable means". (Note: He was born on 2 October 1771.) (Note: Reference 1, Peter Cowan's A Faithful Picture contains all letters referred to in this article.)

When Eliza was 13, her mother was committed to an asylum for the insane after she had attempted to take the life of a friend. "She attempted this by leaving the room and returning with an axe".

In 1836, she married Thomas Brown, who was a road surveyor. A son Kenneth was born on 19 August 1837 and Vernon was born in 1839.

== Emigration ==
Thomas Brown disclosed the reason why the couple considered emigrating in a letter to William Bussey in 1850:

I never had a wish to leave prosperity in England where I always felt comfortable and happy for the chance of what might be done in any other country. My sole object in coming hither was for the improvement of Mrs Brown's health and spirits, she was often very miserable and particularly in the winter season and often expressed a wish that I would remove to some warmer climate, and took a particular fancy to Swan River which she has never deviated from, always liking the Colony and seeing better hope than I ever did. Her health and spirits were certainly much benefited which makes me not regret the change although it has plunged me into pecuniary difficulties.

The Browns obtained advice from friends Samuel Waterman Viveash and William Tanner, who had already settled in Western Australia.

In November 1840, the Browns left England to emigrate to Western Australia. They travelled in a steerage cabin on the Sterling with 14 other emigrants. They brought with them seven servants Eliza started writing letters to her father during the voyage.

Shortly after leaving, as Eliza wrote to her father:

...a violent gale of wind arose directly opposed to our course and we were driven back again in 24 hours as far as Beechy Head, five days and nights we were exposed to the violence of the storm during which I regret to say our horses perished. The Captain ordered all sails to be furled and there was not one spread during this period, all that could be done was to turn the ship occasionally to keep her off the land and this was effected with great difficulty. I was obliged to keep in bed with the children two days to keep them from danger of things falling upon them and we were most fortunate in having the articles in our cabin securely lashed before the gale came on, every one else were exposed to great danger and much inconvenience by their boxes, drawers, etc. getting loose and tumbling about......There are only two horses remaining alive out of six that were shipped on board the Sterling. Our poor creatures and two others that belonged to Mr Samson were thrown overboard on Sunday, their necks broken from the violent pitching and tossing of the ship.

They arrived in Western Australia in March 1841.

== Grass Dale ==
The Browns purchased from Revett Henry Bland a farm called Grass Dale, near York.

A son Aubrey was born in 1841 at York. Eliza wrote to her father about this:

July 8th. Bedtime arrived before I had concluded my letter on the 3rd. I had therefore put the writing aside intending to finish on the following morning, then a little Boy arrived during the night, resembling Kenneth for vigour and healthfulness but disabling me for resuming the pen again so early as intended, and wholly frustrating my intention of writing dear Emma and Matilda at present.

Quoting historian Geoffrey Bolton:

[They] lived in a thatched shed warmed in winter by the pan of coals. The hundred kilometres separating her from Perth to the Avon Valley seemed limitless to a woman nursing a small child. She was, she wrote.....'without the common necessities of life'.

In September 1842, life may have become a little more comfortable as Thomas leased a farm house and other farm buildings from a neighbour Mr John Wall Hardey.

In 1843, Maitland was born. (Note: The wording of the announcement was: "Birth.-On the 17th inst., at Grass Dale, the lady of Thomas Brown, Esq, of a son.)

There was a depression in Western Australia and they struggled financially. "Costs remained high, but the price of stock fell." They were indebted to Eliza's father who had loaned them money or guaranteed loans. Thomas had to resort to cutting sandalwood to earn a living.

On 15 December 1844, their son, Vernon, drowned in the River Avon. Another son was born in 1845, and named Vernon. and Matilda was born on 25 November 1847.

Eliza writes about this to her father as follows:

...as I know you are gallant enough to take a great interest in the fair sex I will introduce a young Lady to your notice, Matilda Brown, who opened her eyes to this world on Thursday the 25th November.

Not long after they moved into their new home at Grass Dale in 1845, the home was struck by lightning:

It happened on the 17th of May, the lightning entered through the solid wall of one of the front rooms then struck the wall above the fireplace, entered the chimney between the paper at the bottom and the tinning. Strange to say we had nothing spoilt worth mentioning though there were such visible marks of the lightning having been amongst every thing. Two of the children and myself received a severe electric shock, we screamed out at the same instant and felt something very powerful around us. Had it happened in the night we should have been crushed to death, that is Mr Brown, myself and the infant for more than a ton of bricks fell on our bed. I shudder to think of the desolate state the poor children would have been in had the storm not providentially happened in the day time. The iron rods on top of our bedstead were wrenched off by the lightning and scattered in all parts of the room, it also deeply indented a tin box underneath the bed in two places and perforated a small hole beneath which some flannel in the ox was scorched.

On one occasion in 1848, her son Kenneth was accidentally speared. In another incident:

Little Vernon...went out with Correll who was sent to get in a load of wood. On his return, Vernon fell under the wheel of the dray, the horse was backed very promptly so that he was extricated without any bones being broken, but he has a very black leg and goes limping about, nothing depressed, but as usual as gay as a little lark.

Education was a problem for Eliza, she wrote:

The coming to this country has a great disadvantage for children in one respect, the dearth there is of good instruction. I had hoped and have endeavoured to teach my children until they might be put into abler hands, but the increase of family diminished my opportunities and energies....to be enabled to do much if any good with the elder ones..

== Champion Bay ==
In 1850, her husband joined a party exploring the Champion Bay district. He selected 40,000 acres (160 km^{2}) on the Greenough River, and the following year established a homestead there, which he called Glengarry. Eliza was left to manage the farm at York.

A daughter Janet was born in 1850.

In May and June 1851, Eliza herself rode with her husband and others to Champion Bay, and was persuaded by the Governor to write her account of the journey, which was published in the Inquirer. She explained to her father why she joined the journey to Champion Bay:

The object of this is for me to see whether I could make up my mind to go and reside there with the family, and I look upon it as a wondrous privilege to be allowed a choice in the matter.

== Fremantle ==
The Browns did not move to Champion Bay because in May 1851, the Governor appointed Thomas as a Member of the Western Australian Legislative Council and they moved to Perth. (Note: He resigned in about August 1851.) In October 1851, Brown was appointed acting Police Magistrate in Fremantle, during the absence of Thomas Yule. Brown accepted the position and he and Eliza and family moved to Fremantle. Grass Dale was let. He was appointed resident magistrate for Fremantle the following year, and from 1856 was also Perth's Collector of Customs.

== Later years ==
Eliza returned to England in 1859 to see her father before he died, taking Aubrey with her. (Note: She departed on 4 October 1859 on Robert Morrison and returned on 9 November 1860 on Lord Raglan.) In October 1862, Thomas Brown was transferred to the position of Resident Magistrate at Geraldton. He held the position until his death the following June.

After Thomas died fortune had little kindness for Eliza. She was to spend many years as a rather lonely figure, living for part of the time at Guildford, (Note: In a house called the "Parsonage".) occasionally with her grown children and their families. (Note: Quoting from Peter Cowan's epilogue.)

In 1876, she gave evidence in the case involving her son Kenneth who had been charged with murder after shooting his second wife. The defence tried to show he was insane and Eliza gave evidence of the insanity of her mother.

She died on 24 April 1896.

Edith Cowan was her granddaughter.

== Letters ==
Eliza's legacy is her letters to her father. These "form a valuable addition to early accounts of the Swan River Colony, describing it in its second decade of existence." The letters begin aboard ship in 1840 and cease in 1852.

The letters were edited for the book "A Faithful Picture" by the Browns' great-grandson and writer, Peter Cowan.
