= Aimable Duperouzel =

French-born convict and settler of Western Australia

Aimable Ciril Duperouzel (alternatively Amiable Sierl Duperouzel) (17 March 1831 – 10 December 1901) was a French-born convict transported to colonial Western Australia and a notable settler of the town of York. He was colloquially known in York as John, the Frenchman.

== Early life ==
Born Aimable Ciril Duperouzel in Saint-Aubin-du-Perron, Coutances, Manche Lower Normandy, France on 17 March 1831, he was the youngest son of Charles and Radégondle Duperouzel (Du pérouzel). Aimable was raised on the family farm.

== Life on the Channel Islands ==
Duperouzel emigrated to the Channel Island of Jersey prior to 1848. He faced court accused of inducing a 10-year-old son of Elias Billot to rob his father on 5 September 1848 but the charge could not be substantiated and was later dropped.

Duperouzel married his first wife Elizabeth (Betsey) Susanne Ferey 18 months later in March 1850 at Saint Helier. Both newlyweds lied about their age. At the time of their marriage Amiable was 18 whilst Elizabeth would have been 24, having been born in the Parish of Trinity on 19 June 1826. This was done to avoid requiring written permission of Duperouzel's parents as was the law at the time.

On 15 August 1851 Elizabeth gave birth to a son John Aimable Duperouzel.

A few months later in November 1851 Duperouzel plead guilty to theft of several fowls on 30 October. After entering his plea Aimable requested permission to depart Jersey to "avoid further prosecution" which was granted.

Duperouzel and his family departed for nearby Guernsey. The couple's son, John Aimable, was baptized in February 1852 at Saint Peter Port. He died on 25 October 1854 at three years of age.

A few years later Aimable was brought before the courts on a string of offences, the most serious of which were robbery charges for the repeated theft from a drapery shop between April 1855 and August 1856. While awaiting trial Duperouzel made "two ineffectual" escape attempts; as a result, he was sentenced to ten years' penal transportation on 6 September 1856.

== Imprisonment ==
Duperouzel spent about sixteen months in prison in England before being transported to Western Australia aboard Lord Raglan. Aimable boarded the ship on 22 February 1858 at Portsmouth.

He was given the number 4840 and was described on arrival as being five feet seven and a quarter inches tall [171 cm], of stout appearance, dark, with black hair, hazel eyes and a cut on the right side of his chin. He was protestant and able to read and write.

The Lord Raglan departed Plymouth on 6 March 1858 with 270 male convicts on board.

== Western Australia ==
Duperouzel arrived in Fremantle aboard Lord Raglan on 1 June 1858. Within his first year in the colony, in May 1859, he received his ticket of leave. He was grubbing for a farmer in York at the time.

Two years later, on 15 June 1861, Aimable received a conditional pardon. He had served about half of his ten-year sentence at the time.

Whilst working as a labourer and stable hand for Stephen Stanley Parker of York, Duperouzel met Julie Neagle (14 November 1844 – 8 January 1926), an Irish migrant working as a housemaid on the farm. Though he had been married whilst living in Jersey, Aimable and Julie were married on 26 March 1863. Whether he had heard of her death, or simply chose not to seek out his first wife is not known and no record exists of Elizabeth Ferey after Aimable's transportation.

In 1871 Duperouzel made an application for a tillage lease of 40 hectares (100 acres) at Qualen, southwest of York. It was rare for an expiree to save enough to purchase land, so much so that it merited mention in Janet Millett's book, An Australian Parsonage;

A benevolent person whom we know proposed the establishment of a savings’ bank for the shepherds, and endeavoured to induce an old colonist to assist him in the scheme, but only met the answer, ‘Teach ‘em to save their money? that's not what we want; if they once begin they will be our servants no longer!’ And the stupid old man, who had himself begun life as a day labourer in England, could not be brought to see that to improve the conditions of individuals would help to enrich the community at large. Good servants, however, who were bent on saving, could continue to put by money in spite of all disadvantages; and a French convict, who afterwards brought land and did very well, once brought to my husband as much as thirty-eight pounds of his earnings, with the request that he would take care of the sum for him. I was glad when the Frenchman carried away his bank notes a few weeks afterwards, for in Western Australia no one feels safe with money in the house or on the person, so that cheques are given for sums as low as half a sovereign.

Duperouzel named his farm Black Wattle Flats, purportedly for the "stands of black wattle" which dominated the block previously. Aimable increased his land holdings considerably whilst he occupied the farm at Qualen. One request for a pastoral lease caused conflict with former employer and politician Parker, who petitioned the commissioner of crown lands to deny Duperouzel application.

By September 1884 other settlers had taken up lands between Black Wattle Flats and York. Eventually the old unsurveyed tracks which Duperouzel had used to reach town became enveloped by fenced farmland. It took two years to petition for the surveying of a new road, possibly because Duperouzel's proposed road placement passed through lands owned by prominent families who opposed him. Ultimately, Aimable was successful. He received a written apology from the York Road Board and a new road was surveyed in August 1886.

== Supreme Court case ==
Duperouzel's contact with the legal system did not end with his pardon. Over the decades he lived in York he was involved in numerous complaints to the police. This culminated in an 1898 Supreme Court case where Duperouzel accused publican and operator of the Castle Hotel, York, James T. Craig of slander. The case was the result of a dispute which occurred in York opposite the Castle Hotel.

The West Australian reported that Craig:

In the presence of a number of witnesses, stated that the plaintiff was a convict and had been sent out to this country for thieving that instead of being called a retired farmer and horse dealer, he ought to be called a retired horse stealer, that he had set fire to and burned other people's land, and that he had mares which had four foals a year.

Craig entered a counter-claim against Duperouzel for comments which implicated him as a murderer and poisoner of his patrons. Chief Justice Alexander Onslow found in favour of the plaintiff, Duperouzel. In delivering his judgement Onslow expressed disappointment at "see[ing] the charge of being a convict hurled against a man who had lived for 40 years as a well-conducted person." Craig's counter claim was dismissed and Duperouzel was awarded £250, equivalent to A$45,223 in 2022, in damages.

== Death and legacy ==
In the early 1890s, Duperouzel built a cottage in York using stone from the farm at Qualen, which has since become heritage listed. Aimable died on 10 December 1901.

Duperouzel and his wife had seven children. Their second child John Aimable Duperouzel was given the same name as Duperouzel's only child from his first marriage. Similarly to his older half brother and namesake, John Aimable died young. Duperouzel was survived by his six other children and his wife.

Duperouzel has been described as a prominent and colourful member of the York community. He was known by most as John the Frenchman, as his French name was difficult for York locals and was etched incorrectly on his tombstone as "Amiable Sierl Duperouzel".
