= Edith Cowan =

Australian social reformer and politician (1861–1932)

Edith Cowan OBE
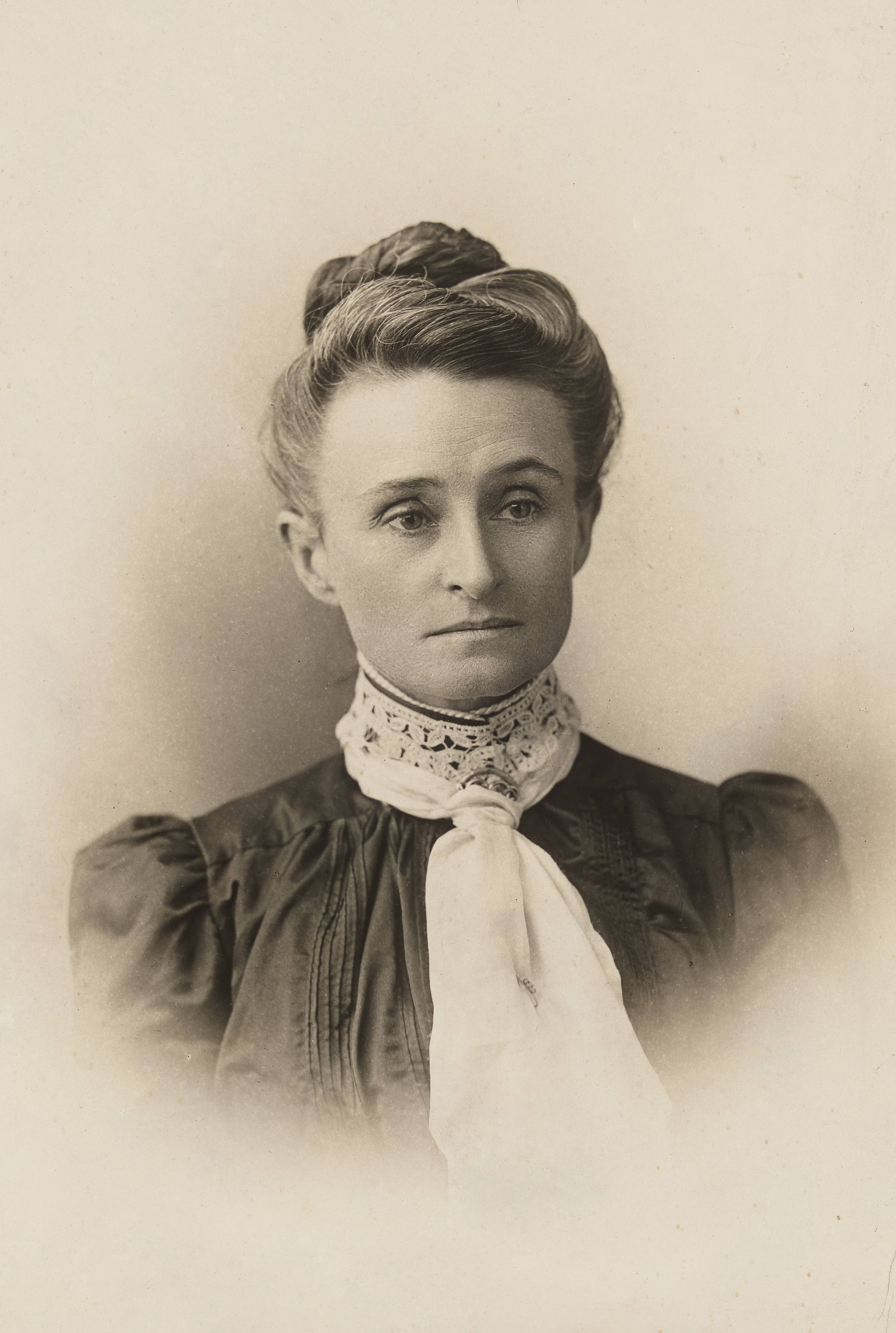
- Cowan in c. 1900

Member of the Legislative Assembly of Western Australia for West Perth
- In office 12 March 1921 – 22 March 1924
- Preceded by: Thomas Draper
- Succeeded by: Thomas Davy

Personal details
- Born: Edith Dircksey Brown; 2 August 1861 Glengarry station, near Geraldton, Western Australia
- Died: 9 June 1932 (aged 70) Subiaco, Western Australia
- Resting place: Karrakatta Cemetery
- Party: Nationalist
- Spouse: James Cowan (m. 1879)

Edith Dircksey Cowan OBE (née Brown; 2 August 1861 – 9 June 1932) was an Australian social reformer who worked for the rights and welfare of women and children. She is best known as the first Australian woman to serve as a member of parliament. Cowan has been featured on the reverse of Australia's fifty-dollar note since 1995.

Cowan was born at Glengarry station near Geraldton, Western Australia. She was the granddaughter of two of the colony's early settlers, Thomas Brown and John Wittenoom. Cowan's mother died when she was seven, and she was subsequently sent to boarding school in Perth. At the age of 14, her father, Kenneth Brown, was hanged for the murder of her stepmother, making her an orphan. She subsequently lived with her grandmother in Guildford, Western Australia until her marriage at the age of 18. She and her husband would have five children together, splitting their time between homes in West Perth and Cottesloe.

In 1894, Cowan was one of the founders of the Karrakatta Club, the first women's social club in Australia. She became prominent in the women's suffrage movement, which saw women in Western Australia granted the right to vote in 1899. Cowan was also a leading advocate for public education and the rights of children (particularly those born to single mothers). She was one of the first women to serve on a local board of education, and in 1906 helped to found the Children's Protection Society, whose lobbying resulted in the creation of the Children's Court the following year. Cowan was a co-founder of the Women's Service Guild in 1909, and in 1911 helped establish a state branch of the National Council of Women.

Cowan was a key figure in the creation of the King Edward Memorial Hospital for Women, and became a member of its advisory board when it opened in 1916. She was made a justice of the Children's Court in 1915 and a justice of the peace in 1920. In 1921, Cowan was elected to the Legislative Assembly of Western Australia as a member of the Nationalist Party, becoming Australia's first female parliamentarian. She was defeated after just a single term, but maintained a high profile during her tenure and managed to secure the passage of several of her private member's bills.

== Early life ==
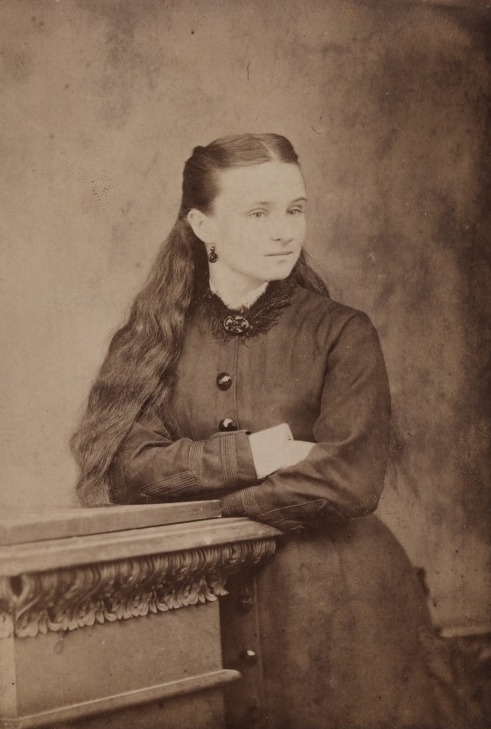
Cowan as a teenager, c. 1876

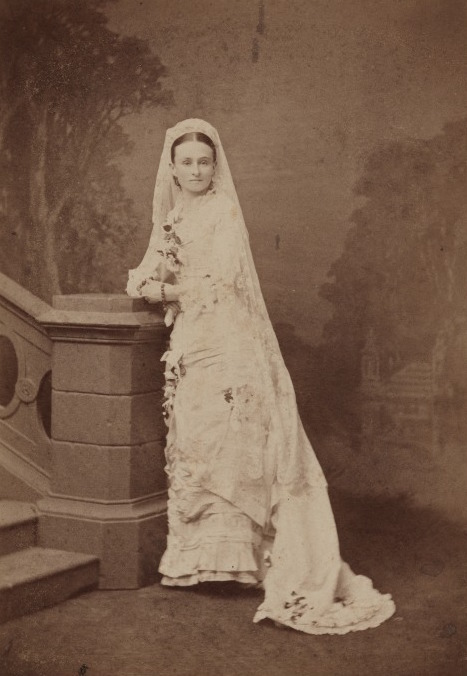
Cowan in her wedding dress

Cowan was born on 2 August 1861 at Glengarry, a sheep station near Geraldton, Western Australia. (Note: Glengarry station is now located in Moonyoonooka, a rural locality on the eastern margin of Geraldton.) She was the second child of Kenneth Brown, pastoralist and son of early York settlers Thomas and Eliza Brown, and his first wife Mary Eliza Dircksey Wittenoom, a teacher and the daughter of the colonial chaplain, J. B. Wittenoom. Cowan's mother died in childbirth in 1868 when Cowan was only seven. She went to a Perth boarding school run by the Misses Cowan, sisters of her future husband. Her adolescence was shattered in 1876 by the ordeal of her father's trials and hanging for the murder, that year, of his second wife. He murdered his second wife by shooting her when they were packing. Cowan was a solitary person, committed nevertheless to social reforms which enhanced women's dignity and responsibility and which secured proper care for mothers and children.

After her father's death, Cowan left her boarding school and moved to Guildford to live with her grandmother. There, she attended tuition of Canon Sweeting, a former headmaster of Bishop Hale's School who had taught a number of prominent men including John Forrest and Septimus Burt. According to her biographer, Sweeting's tuition left Cowan with "a life-long conviction of the value of education, and an interest in books and reading".

== Community work ==
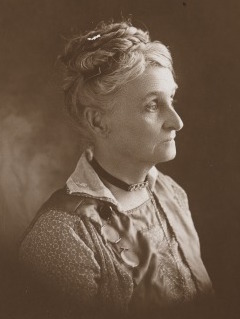
Cowan in 1921, the year she was elected to parliament

Cowan became involved with social issues and injustices in the legal system, especially with respect to women and children. In 1894, she helped found the Karrakatta Club, a group in which women "educated themselves for the kind of life they believed they ought to be able to take". In time, she became the club's president, life member, and trustee. The Karrakatta Club became involved in the campaign for women's suffrage, successfully gaining the vote for women in 1899.

After the turn of the century, she turned her eye to welfare issues. She was particularly concerned with women's health and the welfare of disadvantaged groups, such as disadvantaged children and prostitutes. She became extraordinarily active in women's organisations and welfare organisations, serving on numerous committees. The building of Perth's King Edward Memorial Hospital for Women in 1916 was largely a result of her efforts. She helped form the Women's Service Guilds in 1909 and was a co-founder of the Western Australia's National Council of Women, serving as president from 1913 to 1921 and vice-president until her death. Cowan was also a Western Australian delegate to the national assembly for 19 years.

In 1916, she became a Freemason, admitted to the Australian federation of Droit Humain.

She believed that children should not be treated as adults and, accordingly, founded the Children's Protection Society. The society had a major role in the subsequent introduction of children's courts. In 1915, she was appointed to the bench of the new court and continued on in this position for eighteen years. In 1920, she became one of the first female Justices of the Peace. Her great great nephew David Malcolm followed in her footsteps, by becoming Chief Justice of the Supreme Court of Western Australia in 1988.

During World War I, she collected food and clothing for soldiers at the front and coordinated efforts to care for returned soldiers. She became chairperson of the Red Cross Appeal Committee and was rewarded when, in 1920, she was appointed an Officer of the Order of the British Empire (OBE).

In her final years, she was an Australian delegate to the 1925 International Conference of Women held in the United States. She helped to found the Royal Western Australian Historical Society in 1926 and assisted in the planning of Western Australia's 1929 Centenary celebrations. Though she remained involved in social issues, illness forced her to withdraw somewhat from public life in later years.

=== Community positions held ===
Beside being a Member of Parliament, Cowan held positions on many boards in Western Australia, in 1929 during the centenary The West Australian published a list of these;

- Perth Hospital Board
- King Edward Maternity Hospital Advisory Board
- Chairman of the Perth Hospital Red Cross Auxiliary
- President of the Military Nurses Home committee
- President of Pageantry and sights committee – WA Historical Society
- Vice President of WA League of Nations Union
- Red Cross division committee
- Children's Protection Society
- Town Planning Association
- Housewives Association
- Infant Health Association
- WA Historical Society
- Nationalist Party Executive
- Governor of St Mary's Church School
- General and Provisional Synods of the Church of England
- Bush Nursing Association
- Centenary Committee
- Women's Immigration Auxiliary
- Girl Guides Council
- Karrakatta Club
- Western Australia National Council of Women

== Politics ==
In 1921 Cowan stood as the Nationalist candidate for the Legislative Assembly seat of West Perth because she felt that domestic and social issues were not being given enough attention. During those times, voting was not compulsory, yet for the WA 1921 elections there was a 69% turn out, with a majority of women on the roll. She won by 46 votes, defeating the Attorney-General Thomas Draper, who originally introduced the amendment to the Constitution Act (1899) in order to allow women to stand for Parliament. The turnout surprised even Cowan herself, stating "I never thought I would win. I worked hard, and my committee supported me royally [...] but I never thought I would win." Cowan was the first woman to be elected to an Australian parliament, and furthermore the second woman in the British Empire. Cowan's election signified an important an important development in women's political representation. On July 28th, 1921, she made her inaugural speech, acknowledging the significance and responsibility of being the first woman appointed to an Australian parliament. It is customary that this speech is listened to uninterrupted, yet during Cowan's speech there were multiple male members of parliament who called out and interrupted her. She stated in her speech that "It is a great responsibility to be the only woman here, and i want to emphasise the necessity which exists for other women being here." Despite the significance of her election, Cowan was initially not enthusiastic about running, well aware of the ridicule she would face for her aspiration in a parliamentary career. She only decided to run 4 weeks out from the date. Cowan's political career took place within a political environment where women's contributions were frequently looked down upon and challenged. During her campaign and career, she faced criticism from newspapers and other politicians who questioned her ability to juggle a political career alongside her domestic duties as a wife and a mother.

She campaigned for women's rights in parliament, pushing through the Women's Legal Status Act 1923 which removed the legal barriers preventing women from entering positions and holding professions, allowing women to be involved in the legal profession. She also succeeded in passing the Administration Act Amendment 1922 just one year after winning her seat, placing mothers in an equal position with fathers when their children died without having made a will. Additionally, Cowan was one of the first to promote sex education in schools. However, she lost her seat at the 1924 election and after running as a member of the Women's Electoral lead, failed to regain her seat again in 1927.

Cowan supported the secession of Western Australia from the federation and was active in the Dominion League. In September 1930 she spoke at the inaugural meeting of the league's Claremont branch alongside leading secession campaigner Keith Watson. She was a delegate to the secession convention in August 1931 and successfully moved a motion calling on members "to support, irrespective of party divisions, election candidates pledged to secession and to the securing of a referendum".

== Personal life ==
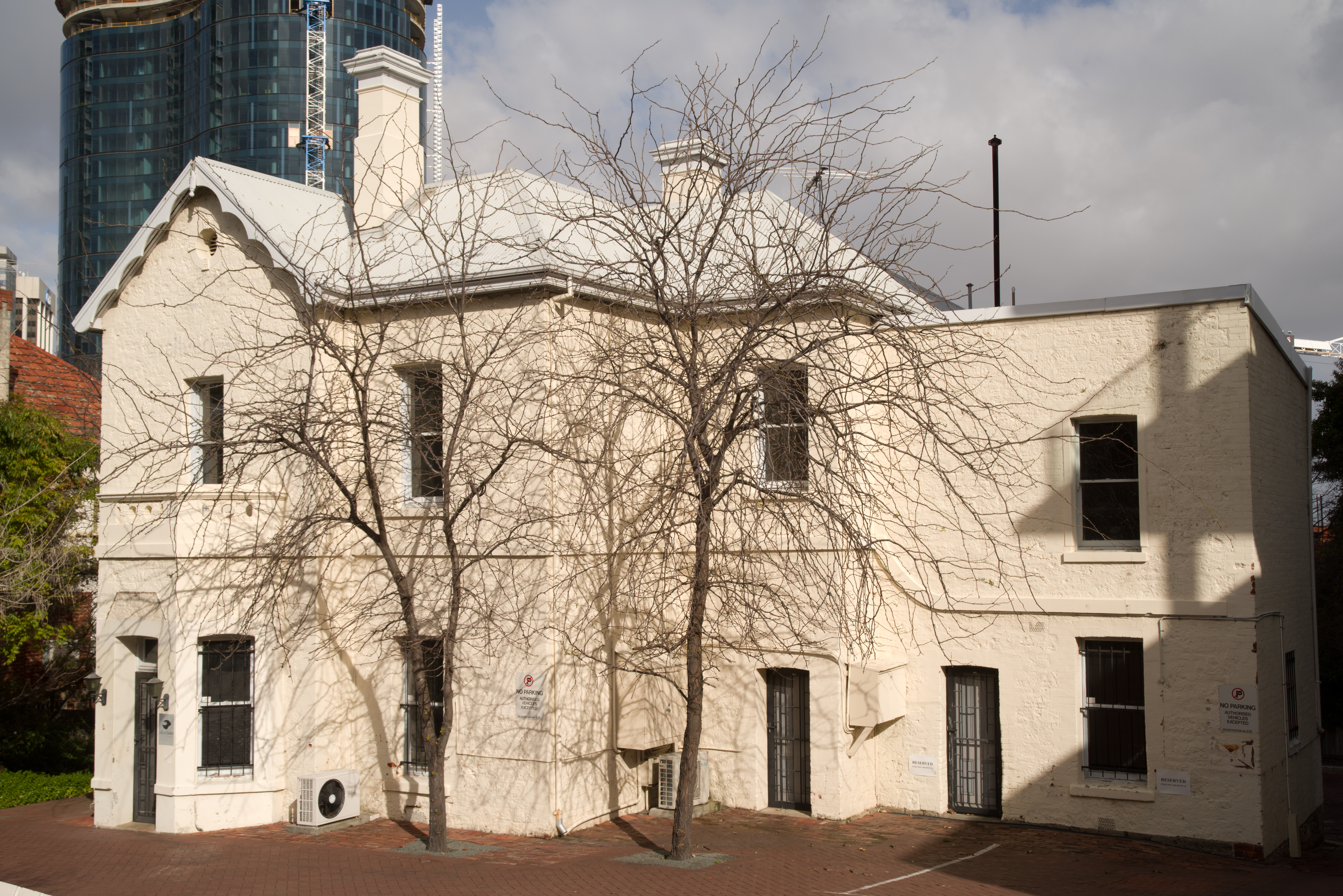
Cowan's residence from 1883 to 1896 and then again from 1912 to 1919 – added to the state register of heritage properties in 2016

At the age of 18, on 12 November 1879, Edith married James Cowan, then Registrar of the Supreme Court. They lived at Scotstoun, 31 Malcolm Street, West Perth for most of their lives, but are also well known for having one of the first houses in Avonmore Terrace, Cottesloe, where they lived from 1896 to 1912. Cowan was married in St George's Cathedral, Perth. She was one of the first women elected to the Anglican Synod in 1916.

== Death and burial ==
Following an extended period of ill-health Cowan died of pancreatic cancer at the Avro Hospital, Subiaco on 9 June 1932, at the age of 70. After a short service at St. Mary's Church, West Perth, a large public funeral was held at Karrakatta Cemetery where she was buried.

== Legacy ==
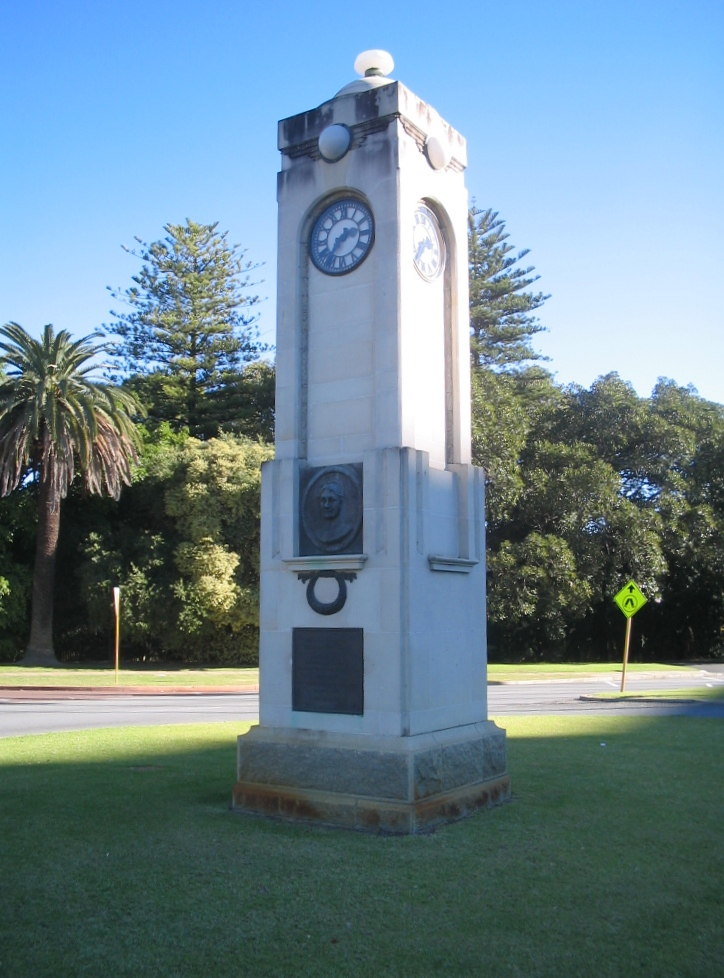
The Edith Dircksey Cowan Memorial, formerly known as the Edith Cowan Memorial Clock

Edith Cowan's portrait appears on the back of Australia's fifty-dollar note.

Two years after her death, the Edith Cowan Memorial Clock was unveiled at the entrance to Perth's Kings Park. Believed to be the first civic monument to an Australian woman, it was built in the face of persistent opposition which has been characterised as "representative of a gender bias operating at the time".

Her portrait featured on an Australian postage stamp in 1975, as part of a six-part "Australian Women" series. Australia Post honoured Edith again in 2021, for the centenary of her election, as Australia’s first woman parliamentarian. During the WAY 1979 sesquicentennial celebrations, a plaque was laid in St Georges Terrace in her honour. It is on the corner of Milligan Street and is for 1921.

In 1984, the federal Division of Cowan was created and named after her, and in January 1991 the Western Australian College of Advanced Education was renamed Edith Cowan University (ECU).

Her portrait appears on the Australian fifty dollar note, a polymer banknote that was first issued in October 1995. In 2019 the release of the latest $50 note caused a sensation when it was discovered that the word 'responsibility' in Edith Cowan's speech was spelt incorrectly, missing the last 'i'. In 1996, a plaque honouring her was placed in St George's Cathedral, Perth. There are references to her in the Centenary of Western Australian Women's Suffrage Memorial in Kings Park, and in a tapestry that was hung in King Edward Memorial Hospital in 2000 to honour women involved in the hospital.

In 1991, Edith Cowan University purchased the house in which Edith Cowan, her husband and family had resided at 31 Malcolm Street. The house was reconstructed on the university's Joondalup campus with the assistance of the West Coast College of TAFE. The reconstructed house opened in 1997 as Building 20 on that campus, and currently houses the Peter Cowan Writer's Centre.

Edith Cowan was added to the Victorian Honour Roll of Women in 2001. Her life was the subject of the stage play With Fire in Her Heart: the Edith Cowan Story by Western Australian author and playwright Trevor Todd, in 2020.

A statue of Cowan located in St Georges Terrace‘s first statue of a woman, was added in June 2025. It is located in front of ANZAC House, the current location of the Karrakatta Club.

== Other sources ==
- Black, David; Bolton, Geoffrey (2001a). Biographical Register of Members of the Parliament of Western Australia. Vol. One: 1870–1930 (Revised ed.). Parliament House: Parliament of Western Australia. ISBN 0730738140.
- Black, David; Phillips, Harry (2000). Making a Difference: Women in the Western Australian Parliament 1921–1999. Parliament House, Perth, Western Australia: Parliament of Western Australia. ISBN 0-7307-4464-7.
- Cowan, Peter (1978). A unique position: a biography of Edith Dircksey Cowan 1861–1932. Nedlands, Western Australia: University of Western Australia Press. ISBN 0-85564-135-5.
- Phillips, Harry (1996). The Voice of Edith Cowan: Australia's First Woman Parliamentarian 1921–1924. Edith Cowan University. ISBN 0729802884.
- Serle, Percival (1949). "Cowan, Edith". Dictionary of Australian Biography. Sydney: Angus & Robertson.
- "Edith Dircksey Cowan Memorial" (PDF). Register of Heritage Places – Assessment Documentation. Heritage Council of Western Australia. 20 December 2000. Archived from the original (PDF) on 20 August 2006.
