= Thomas Brown (settler) =

Australian politician

Thomas Brown (1803 – 5 July 1863) was an early settler in colonial Western Australia, and a Member of the Western Australian Legislative Council.

Brown was born in England in 1803. He married Eliza Bussey in 1836, and by 1840 he was living in Cuddesdon, Oxfordshire and working as a road surveyor. He was reasonably well off financially by then, having an interest in the rental of a turnpike, and some rental property in the district.

In November 1840, Brown and his family emigrated to Western Australia, arriving on Sterling in March 1841. They brought with them seven servants, including eighteen-year-old John Taylor. During a severe storm on board, all their horses except two suffered broken necks and died.

On arrival at the Swan River Colony, Brown went to York, where, after a month staying at Yangedine, in June 1841 he purchased a 7,000-acre (2,800 ha) farm called Grass Dale from Revett Henry Bland for £1,500, of which £500 was lent back. (Note: Further money was owed to Bland for the purchase of "the whole of the pool for the better watering of the stock and sheep which cost between eighty and ninety pounds": Letter from Eliza Brown to William Bussey 14 December 1842.) Brown also purchased ewes for the property, and began selecting horses for breeding.

In July 1841 he accepted a position as assistant government surveyor with a salary of £300 a year, leaving Thomas Fruin to look after the farm, but the work took him away from his property too much, and he resigned in January 1842.

In September 1842, Brown leased a farm house and other farm buildings from a neighbour John Wall Hardey who had "quitted this to improve a farm he has in another part of the colony".

Brown became active in the York Agricultural Society, being its president during 1843. In November 1844 he was appointed a justice of the peace.

Brown continued to work at Grass Dale and had great success in the development of his land and stock, but little success financially. He suffered particularly from poisoning of his sheep. He wrote:

My sheep have been and many others poisoned to the number of from one to three hundred at a time. These are losses which grieve me as much as anything. The poison is one if not the greatest drawback the Colony has.

Grass Dale had cost him £3000 and he was in debt to his father-in-law in the sum of £2000. In about 1849, his father-in-law supplied a further £550 to the Browns to clear Bland's debt but instead of doing this, Brown entered into an agreement with Bland to supply £300 worth of sandalwood at Guildford in the hope of selling it for a profit, but just as the wood was delivered, the price of sandalwood fell to almost nothing so the wood was unsaleable. Bland wrote to Brown saying he was leaving the Colony and wanted to be paid £200 and Brown asked for another for another £200 from his father-in-law. (Note: On a salary of £263 per annum.) (Note: William Bussey informed Eliza that he would be settling the debt of £2000 on Eliza.)

Together with his son Kenneth, Brown joined a party of eight in exploring overland from York to the Champion Bay district. The party travelled 300 miles (480 km) and found large tracts of apparently good land. Brown selected 40,000 acres (16,000 ha) on the Greenough River, and the following year established a homestead there, which he called Glengarry. Apart from there being "no known poison" the reason why the Browns and others went to Champion Bay was explained in a letter from Eliza to her father, William Bussey:

The settled districts are at present over-fed and will not bring either sheep or cattle to any profitable size, nothing in fact can be fattened properly about the homesteads.

Brown himself said in another letter:

....it was advisable to remove the greater part of the stock for a year at least as the York and Toodyay districts have been overstocked and the land requires rest for the feed to revoedr itself, which you see has been the result of such a proceeding in New South Wales.

Shortly before his intended relocation to Glengarry, Brown was nominated to the Legislative Council, a position which required him to be in Perth. As Brown was committed to moving to Champion Bay, he stated his intention to decline the nomination, but was persuaded by Governor Captain Charles Fitzgerald to sit for the remainder of the session.

Brown became involved in controversy almost as soon as he took his seat. In the governor's address to the new Legislative Council, Fitzgerald stated that he considered the new Members, Brown, Marshall Waller Clifton and Lionel Samson, to represent their districts. This statement was then misreported by The Perth Gazette as having been said by the men themselves. As none of the men were elected representatives, this greatly angered the colony's many supporters of responsible government, and the York settlers published a declaration denying that Brown represented them, or indeed that he had any political influence in the district. Shortly afterwards, Brown published a dignified letter stating that he had never considered himself to be a representative of any particular class or district, then resigned his seat.

Once again Brown prepared to relocate to Glengarry, but in October 1851 he was appointed acting police magistrate in Fremantle, (Note: On a salary of £263 per annum.) during the absence of Thomas Yule. Brown accepted the position and moved his family to Fremantle, leaving Glengarry in the hands of his eldest son Kenneth. He was appointed resident magistrate for Fremantle the following year, and from 1856 was also Perth's collector of customs.

In October 1862, Brown was transferred to the position of resident magistrate at Geraldton. He held the position until his death the following June. Early in June 1863, Brown suffered a series of heart attacks, and he died on 5 June. He was buried two days later in the Geraldton cemetery.

Among Brown's seven children were Kenneth, Maitland and Matilda, who married Samuel Hamersley, who purchased Grass Dale in 1878 from Eliza Brown for £2,200. Edith Cowan was Thomas's granddaughter.
