= Edward Wilson Landor =

Lawyer, scholar, writer and Western Australian pioneer

Edward Wilson Landor (1811–1878) was a lawyer, scholar, writer and pioneer in the early days of the British colony of Western Australia.

== Early life and education ==
Edward Landor was born in 1811 in Rushold in Lancashire, England. He had some legal training and was given a junior partnership in his uncle's law practice.

=== The Landor family ===
Edward's father was a first cousin of Walter Savage Landor. In 1835, visiting his cousins at their home, Villa Gherardesca at Fiesole, Tuscany- by this time Walter Savage Landor had separated from his wife and left the family- Edward Landor became enamoured of his second cousin, Julia, but resolved to make nothing of his affection; returning to England "while he fancied he was still safe", he heard of Walter Savage Landor's intention never to return to the family and, having observed the vague manner in which Mrs Landor raised the children, who were entirely uneducated and mainly unmonitored, "his sympathies and his common sense" led him to go back to Fiesole to help get the family in some order. At this time, Mrs Landor, perceiving Edward's affection for her daughter, pushed for a marriage between them, and forced him into an admission of his love. This was reported to Walter Savage Landor- "quite maliciously, it seems"- by Julia's brother, Arnold; Walter Savage Landor was furious at Edward's "baseness" (compared with Arnold's "dutiful conduct"), and when Edward returned home he was "abused as a hypocritical schemer" by most of his relatives. Although Edward wrote to Julia's father expressing a willingness to maintain distance from the girl for two years if an engagement could follow, Walter Savage Landor would not change his view. After five years in Australia, Edward returned to England, with Walter Savage Landor's friend Joseph Ablett attempting to help bring the engagement about, but their attempts failed and he returned to Australia.

== Arrival in Western Australia ==
Landor later wrote of his romantic entanglement with his cousin Julia that "the agony of mind I suffered for years nearly killed me, and altho' I had a good career in England I gave up everything"; the state of serious illness in which he found himself led him to decide to emigrate with his brothers to Western Australia. Landor and his brothers Henry, a doctor, and George W. Landor, arrived in the Colony of Western Australia on Advocate on 27 August 1841, together with their subsequent business partner Nathan Elias Knight. The Landor brothers intended to build up a large flock of sheep over six or so years (Note: Edward's sheep were bred from rams imported from Lord Western's flock in Essex.) but discovered that squatting on Government land was not permitted, and so Henry and George farmed in partnership with Nathan Elias Knight, leasing Balladong Farm from Rivett Henry Bland "at a high rent", and "wasted capital upon objects that could never bring in a good return", while Edward remained in Perth and practised as a barrister. His brother George described him as the "richest" of the brothers, "never coming himself to look at his flock".

While practising as a barrister, Landor himself was sued by Walter Andrews for "wilful destruction of complainant's poultry" who roamed onto Landor's yard, and successfully defended himself. (Note: This provided amusing material for chapter 11 of The Bushman, Life in a New Country, Persecutions.)

== The Wiwar case ==
Landor defended Wiwar, an Aboriginal man charged with murder for spearing another Aboriginal man, when the spearing was permitted under Aboriginal law. Wiwar had confessed to the spearing. Landor's defence of Wiwar included the following arguments:

- The court was not competent to try Wiwar because Western Australia was occupied and not conquered.
- The Aboriginal people could not be subject to British law for offences committed amongst themselves without their assent to and acceptance of those laws.
- It is necessary to show that British laws have been imposed on the Aboriginal inhabitants in lieu of their own.
- If criminal law is imposed on Aboriginal people, then the whole of the law should be, including slander and theft.
- The Aboriginal people had laws of their own, and to subject them to British law in addition to Aboriginal law was contrary to justice because it meant that they were being tried and punished twice.
- It was a hardship and injustice to subject an Aboriginal person to British laws that he had never heard of nor was bound to obey, he having acted in performance of his own laws.
- There is no act of parliament imposing British law on Aboriginal people.
- There is no proclamation making Aboriginal people British subjects.
- Merely because an Aboriginal person is employed by the British does not make them subject to British law.
- If there was a killing under Aboriginal law, there was no malice aforethought and therefore there was no murder under British law.

These submissions were rejected by the court and Wiwar was sentenced to death. (Note: The sentence to death was commuted to imprisonment on Rottnest Island. Refer also to Chapter 15 in The Bushman, Life in a New Country.)

== Colonicus ==
From December 1841, Landor began to write occasional pieces for The Inquirer newspaper under the name "Colonicus". These included:

- A complaint about the introduction of import duties
- A complaint about bad management of the mail, particularly to York
- A fable about three field-mice brothers turned out of their paternal home and what they each did
- The need to make the Colony better known in England to attract men with capital, by forming a Western Australian Society which would place advertisements in English newspapers (Note: Landor was active in the formation of the Western Australian Society and donated to it under his own name and as Colonicus.)
- A need for greater communication with India
- A song for farmers at the York Fair complaining about the Squatting Bill

Landor's identity as Colonicus was exposed on 7 September 1842, following which he wrote an apology to all those whom he may have offended.

For a short time, Landor acted as editor of the Perth Gazette. He was also a successful and popular lecturer.

== Appointment to Court of Requests ==
In November 1842, Edward was appointed a commissioner of the new Court of Requests in Perth Guildford and Fremantle, which meant that he ceased to be a barrister, representing clients. He also ceased writing to The Inquirer.

== Return to England ==
He was granted leave in 1846 and returned to England and completed his studies and was enrolled as a solicitor. In March 1847, he married Ellen Harley.

== The Bushman ==
While in England, he published The Bushman, or Life in a New Country, a 31-chapter book dealing with many aspects of Western Australia: the Aboriginals, geography, the economy, the land grant system, flora and fauna and some adventures he and his brothers experienced. Contributions to the book were made by his brothers as well as by James Drummond.

John Wollaston said in his diaries that he considered the book gave the most true and just view of the colonial policy which he had read. However he said of Landor: I thought him too flashy when he was here, though very clever.

== Return to Australia ==
Landor returned to Western Australia in 1859 with his wife and three children. He returned to legal practice in Perth. In 1866, he gave up a good legal practice to become a police magistrate in Perth.

One of his first duties was to be a member of a board of inquiry into the Rev Edward Millett, the Anglican Chaplain in York. Walkinshaw Cowan had accused Millett of "drunkenness, laziness, general moral delinquency and a diminished sense of responsibility". The Anglican Bishop Hale, the Principal Medical Officer in Perth and Landor all came to York in October 1866 to inquire into the matter. They concluded that there was no evidence that Millett drank alcohol and that any "stupefaction" was due to his taking opium because of his disorder. They noted that "the general feeling of people in the District (so far as was ascertained) appears to be one of respect and regard for Mr Millett". They found that instead of him neglecting the sick as he had been charged, the contrary was shown.

== Trial of Lockier Clere Burges ==
In 1871, while droving sheep from the Pilbara to Geraldton, Lockier Clere Burges shot and killed an Aboriginal man known as "Mackle-yell", in a dispute over a stolen saddle. Burges was charged over this incident. Landor and three other magistrates presided at the trial. At the trial, the Crown Solicitor said he would leave the charge open until he had presented the evidence. The magistrates objected to this and so the Crown Solicitor said the charge was murder, which was a capital offence. During the trial, the four magistrates conferred and decided that there was no likelihood of a conviction for murder and the Crown consented to a lesser charge, namely shooting with intent to do bodily harm. Burges was convicted, but the governor Sir Frederick Weld suspended Landor from his office of magistrate on the grounds "of want of capacity, or partiality, or of both, in favour of the accused, the member of an influential family of long standing in the colony, which he would not have done had the accused been friendless and of humble station". The other three magistrates tendered their resignations, which were accepted. A petition was presented to the Secretary of State for the Colonies in London which had been signed by 650 "magistrates, merchants, and others" including every Member of the Legislative Council and Justice of the Peace available in the Colony to sign. An account of the affair was also published by friends of Landor. Landor was subsequently cleared by direction of the Secretary of State, and was restored to his position as magistrate. Throughout this "he took a dignified and tolerant attitude which earned him great respect".

== Death ==
In 1876, he advertised his home for sale. It was said to be "fronting Government House Grounds, and abutting at the rear on Howick Street" (now Hay Street).

He died on 24 October 1878 leaving three daughters and a son, his wife having predeceased him by two years. The Inquirer said of him: "He discharged his duties on the Bench fearlessly and honourably, jealously upholding the dignity of his high and responsible office, and his decisions were generally approved."
