= List of heritage places in York, Western Australia =

List of places in York, Western Australia that are listed on a heritage register, whether it be on the National registers, State Register of Heritage Places, or the Shire of York register. The town site of York was registered as an Historic Town in 1978 on the Register of the National Estate.

inHerit place number	Place name	Notes (source: material from Heritage listings)	Street		Heritage listings	Image
inHerit place number	Place name	Notes (source: material from Heritage listings)	number	name	Heritage listings	Image
18861	House		15	Pool St	Shire register - 22 Sep 2008	
2843	Motor Museum Workshop	Constructed from 1900. Formerly York Motor Garage.	153	Avon Tce	Shire register - 31 Dec 1995	
5999	Spice's Farm	Constructed from 1880. One of the original small farm houses of York. Hipped roof cottage with a front verandah set on a rural block on the outskirts of town. Originally a farmhouse, it was later used as a guesthouse.	780	Spice Rd	Shire register - 31 Dec 1995	
5961	Cotmore	A previous owner of the building, a Mr Henderson, developed a brickworks at the rear of the property. The dwelling was one of the earliest houses built east of the river. Painted Flemish bond brick cottage with a bull nose verandah.	9	Clifford St	Shire register -31 Dec 1995	
6901	Almond Tree - Site containing an			Water St cnr Spencers Brook Rd	Shire register - 31 Dec 1995	
18832	House 3 Dinsdale Street	Constructed from 1900, brick or stone residence with corrugated iron hipped roof and wrap around verandah. Features quoins to openings and timber detail to verandah.	3	Dinsdale St	Shire register - 22 Sep 2008	
2884	Marwick's Shed	Also called Marwick's Barn. Constructed from 1876. Was used for transporting supplies to the goldfields prior to the completion of the Perth-Coolgardie railway line. Is a rare example of local 19th century vernacular construction techniques, particularly the employment of a timber structure to create a large volume without internal load-bearing walls.	19-21	Newcastle St	Shire register - 31 Dec 1995 Register of the National Estate Permanent 21 Mar 1978, Aboriginal Heritage Sites Register Recorded, Classified by the National Trust Classified 05 Mar 1985 State Register Permanent 23 Nov 2001	
2849	Western Australian Bank	Later Bank of New South Wales (NSW) (fmr) and now Westpac Bank. Constructed from 1889. Architect JJ Talbot Hobbs. Victorian Academic Classical style.	147	Avon Tce	Register of the National Estate Registered 21 Mar 1978, Classified by the National Trust Classified 05 Mar 1985, Shire register - 31 Dec 1995 (Shire of York)	Western Australian Bank
3213	Holy Trinity Church, Hall & Rectory	Construction began in November 1854. It was consecrated in 1858. The tower and roof raising was completed in 1893. Also known as the Anglican Church.		Newcastle St	Shire register -31 Dec 1995 Classified by the National Trust Classified 05 Mar 1985, Register of the National Estate Permanent 22 Mar 1978 State Register Permanent 28 Jun 1996	Holy Trinity Church
18825	House	Constructed from 1900. Brick (or stone) residence with corrugated iron hipped roof and iron and timber verandah to the front. Features painted or plasters quoins to front windows and central door/entry.	59	Brunswick Street	Shire register - 22 Sep 2008	
24467	House,	Constructed from 1900.	74	Macartney St	Shire register - 22 Sep 2008	
18868	House		42	Suburban Rd	Shire register - 22 Sep 2008	
2827	Langsford House	A two storied brick house with two storied timber verandah across the front, built close to the road in c1873. A symmetrical house with high pitched hip roof and large cellar. The house was built originally by W. Langsford.	18	Avon Tce	Shire register - 31 Dec 1995 Classified by the National Trust Classified 05 Mar 1985, Register of the National Estate Registered 21 Mar 1978	
5995	Job Bailey's Cottage	Constructed from 1856. The building was originally built for pensioner guard Job Bailey and his family. The cottage is built to a standard pattern for pensioner guard housing by the Royal Engineers, the building contains evidence of early building techniques from the early period of settlement. A small hipped roof cottage with a verandah built in the local vernacular architecture the building has been sympathetically extended a number of time, it still retains its original character. Alterations include – roof raised 18” in the 1890s for ventilation purposes, and an extra wing and rooms latter added.	2	Pool St	Shire register - 31 Dec 1995	
24472	House,	Constructed from 1900. IR & SC Mackenzie	45	Macartney St	Shire register - 22 Sep 2008	
5960	House	This Colonial period building constructed from 1850 features a cellar and original vineyard at rear running to the river. This is one of the earliest shops in York and the owner was believed to have grown, made and sold their own wine from the premises.	208	Avon Tce	Shire register -31 Dec 1995	
18848	House 3 Meares Street	Constructed from 1900. Brick residence with gable features to roof. The bullnose verandah has substantial decorative timber and posts. Garden has mature plantings.	3	Meares St	Shire register - 22 Sep 2008	
18858	House 42 Newcastle Street	Brickwork appears to be painted or rendered with a hipped roof.	42	Newcastle St	Shire register - 22 Sep 2008	
18855	House 25 Newcastle Street	Stone construction, with a hipped roof.	25	Newcastle St	Shire register - 22 Sep 2008	
5986	Mt Bakewell Homestead	Constructed from 1910. The building is representative of the prosperous farming era that developed at the turn of the century.		North Rd	Shire register - 22 Sep 2008	
18850	House 1 Newcastle Street	Simple brick residence with corrugated iron hipped roof and front verandah. Symmetrical façade.	1	Newcastle St	Shire register - 22 Sep 2008	
2857	Shops	Shop and Garage, constructed from 1850. "Interesting façade – verandah appears unsympathetic with the 1850s design."	137-141	Avon Tce	Shire register - 22 Sep 2008	
6907	Monger's Town Precinct incl Swing Bridge over Blands Pool		Bounded by	Pool, Alfred & Ford Sts & River Avon plus	Classified by the National Trust Classified	
2868	Eliza's Cottage	Constructed from 1840 to 1988. Other names are: Lookout for Trains Cottage, Burtons Cottage. Eliza's Cottage is a single storey cottage displaying stylistic features which link it to the Victorian Georgian style.	9	Revett Pl	Shire register - 31 Dec 1995, Classified by the National Trust Classified 05 Mar 1985, Register of the National Estate Permanent 20 Mar 1978 State Register Permanent 05 Jan 2001	Eliza's Cottage
24546	Settlers House and Courtyard	Constructed in 1861 by Henry Stevens.	125	Avon Tce York	Shire register - 31 Dec 1995	
18860	House 71 Newcastle Street	Constructed from 1890. Timber/weatherboard clad residence with corrugated iron hipped roof and front verandah. Simple form with symmetrical façade.	71	Newcastle St	Shire register - 22 Sep 2008	
2887	Old House			Panmure St		
2833	House	Lone Pine Cottage, constructed from 1870.	49	Avon Tce	Shire register - 31 Dec 1995	
5962	House	Constructed from 1875. The building was used as the York Grammar School, established by Frank Bennet, which closed in 1895. Frank Bennet later became the first headmaster of Guildford Grammar School. Large cottage with a large central room and an encircling verandah.	11	Clifford St	Shire register - 31 Dec 1995	
18870	House 56 Suburban Road	Constructed from 1880.	56	Suburban Rd	Shire register - 22 Sep 2008	
6900	1 Carob Tree & 2 large Peppercorn Trees - Site containing		122	Ulster Rd	Shire register - 31 Dec 1995	
18830	Hope Farm	Guest House	15	Carter Rd	Shire register - 22 Sep 2008	
2893	Bridge House & Grounds	Bridge House was built in 1860 by George Wansbrough for Stephen Stanley Parker and his family of thirteen children. A large two storeyed brick house shingled roof now replaced with iron. Situated on back of Avon River, Blands Brook located at the front. Double storey building with a cellar – long balcony connecting East and West end rooms. Located on approximately 1.8ha.	6	Redmile Rd	Shire register - 31 Dec 1995, Register of the National Estate Registered 21 Mar 1978, Classified by the National Trust Classified 1 May 1985 State Register Permanent 30 Oct 1998	
24473	House, 28 Macartney Street	Simple brick residence with corrugated iron hipped roof and verandah. Appears to be in Victoria Georgian Style. Symmetrical form. LR Squires.	28	Macartney St	Shire register - 22 Sep 2008	
18865	House 23 Pool Street	Layla's Cottage	23	Pool St	Shire register - 22 Sep 2008	
2870	Residency Museum	Residency (fmr) Nursing Quarters	5	Brook St	Classified by the National Trust Classified, Register of the National Estate Permanent 21 Mar 1978, Shire register - 31 Dec 1995 State Register Permanent 09 Feb 1996	
18822	House 25 Bird Street	Brick residence with projecting gable and bull-nosed verandah. Has timber verandah brackets and fascia to gable. Possible addition to rear.	25	Bird St	Shire register - 22 Sep 2008	
2890	Uniting Church, Hall & Manse	Fmr Wesleyan Chapel. The place included the original church (now hall – c. 1850s), the later church (1888) and dwelling (c. 1913) to the rear. Church is rectangular brick building with a rendered dado to the exterior and a low pitched CGI roof. The front porch and rear lean-to are of later construction. The 1888 church is an imposing stone building with rendered openings and buttresses, an arched porch entry. The high pitched slate gable roof has a decorative spire. Rear dwelling is brick construction with a surrounding verandah covered with a break pitch hipped CGI roof.		Grey St	Shire register - 31 Dec 1995 Register of the National Estate Permanent 21 Mar 1978, Classified by the National Trust Classified 08 Mar 1983	Wesleyan Chapel
6902	Crossing Cottage	Constructed from 1885. The cottage was constructed for a railway worker and his family. It was for many years the only dwelling in the area. Small cottage with bullnose verandahs. Most original features intact, including roof and fireplaces. Original jarrah boards in hall and main rooms. Part of the original verandah has been enclosed for a bathroom and kitchen.	13-15	William St	Shire register - 31 Dec 1995	
2841	Union Bank and Quarters	Constructed from 1890. Federation Romanesque style. The building still has its original safe.	148	Avon Tce	Shire register - 31 Dec 1995, Classified by the National Trust Classified 05 Mar 1985, Register of the National Estate Registered 21 Mar 1978	
18831	House 34 Clifford Street	Constructed from 1900. Red brick residence with stone footings and rendered above dado/sill height. Verandah features timber posts and balustrade as well as rendered brickwork and columns. The roof is tiled with several gables and stucco chimneys and terracotta pots. S & RJ Cormack	34	Clifford St	Shire register - 22 Sep 2008	
2825	House	Butcher's Shop Cottage, constructed from 1863. It is believed to have been built originally by the blacksmith whose next door foundry no longer survives. A brick house located close to the road with high pitched hipped roof now covered in corrugated iron. There is a cellar under both front rooms, now filled in with road base partly excavated. The verandah across the front has four square posts and the roof extension is a slight breakback extension of the house.	13	Avon Tce	Register of the National Estate Registered 21 Mar 1978, Classified by the National Trust Classified 05 Mar 1985, Shire register - 31 Dec 1995	
18852	House 22 Newcastle Street	Elm House. Construction from 1910. Residence of Marwick family that are pioneers of the York district, connected by history to the “ Marwick Shed” opposite. Stone construction, quoins to openings with a hipped roof.	22	Newcastle St	Shire register - 22 Sep 2008	
24515	House, 30 Macartney Street	WD Freestone & TJ Harrington	30	Macartney St	Shire register - 22 Sep 2008	
2840	Shops	Constructed from 1900. Shops include Jules.	115-119	Avon Tce	Classified by the National Trust Classified 09 Aug 1988, Register of the National Estate Registered 21 Mar 1978,	
18823	House 26 Bird Street	Brick residence with central gable entry. Gable is half-timbered and verandah is brick with decorative timber posts and brackets above.	26	Bird St	Shire register - 22 Sep 2008	
18859	House 49 Newcastle Street	Simple timber frames and weatherboard clad cottage with iron roof and front verandah.	49	Newcastle St	Shire register - 22 Sep 2008	
23997	House, 9 William Street, York	Constructed from 1910	9	William St	Heritage Agreement 23 Oct 2013	
18866	House 36 Suburban Road		36	Suburban Rd	Shire register - 22 Sep 2008	
18776	Malebelling Hall	Malebilling Agricultural Hall		Mannauale Rd		
2879	Convent of Mercy and School (fmr)	Radio 101.3 York FM, Youth Hostel, York Telecentre	29	South St	Classified by the National Trust Classified 01 Apr 1985, Register of the National Estate Registered 21 Mar 1978Shire register - 31 Dec 1995 State Register Permanent 30 Oct 1998	Sisters of Mercy Convent, York
2896	House	A stone building believed to date from the late 19th century with quoin details and a corrugated iron hipped roof. The enclosure to the verandah is intrusive.	9	South St	Register of the National Estate Registered 21 Mar 1978, Classified by the National Trust Classified 01 Apr 1985, Shire register - 31 Dec 1995	
2880	York Town Hall	& York Roll of Honour	79-81	Avon Tce	Register of the National Estate Permanent 21 Mar 1978, Classified by the National Trust Classified 01 Nov 1976, Shire register - 31 Dec 1995 State Register Permanent 07 Feb 1997	
2903	House	Eglantyne. Constructed from 1860. Example of an early worker's cottage for rental. Associated with Wheeler Brothers, original wheelwright settlers in York. Constructed with brick walls and high shingled roof in a symmetrical front protected by a simple verandah. Subsequent rendering alteration to timber details and the addition of a lean-to at the back, have altered the original very simple character of the building.	14	Wheeler St	Shire register - 31 Dec 1995, Classified by the National Trust Classified 01 Apr 1985, Register of the National Estate Registered 21 Mar 1978	
18851	House 15 Newcastle Street	Brickwork appears to be painted or rendered with a hipped roof.	15	Newcastle St	Shire register - 22 Sep 2008	
18821	House 2 Alfred Street	Constructed from 1900. Substantial residence set in large gardens with a wrap around verandah. Features half-timbered gables and large timber framed windows.	2	Alfred St	Shire register - 22 Sep 2008	
2889	Suspension Bridge	Also called the Swing Bridge. First suspension bridge was erected well before the turn of the century and was located where Central Bridge now stands. Present structure was built in 1906 and floods have caused its collapse on many occasions. A significant pedestrian link over the river in the centre of the town. The uniqueness of the bridge adds to its historical importance. A suspension foot bridge with steel cables and timber decking spanning the Avon River between Low Street and Pool Street, linking the commercial centre of the town with Holy Trinity Church. On the west bank adjacent to the bridge is the site of the former town swimming baths where in 1900 Council bylaws prohibited the swimming together of the men and women. Times were set for each sex to swim.		Pool St	Shire register - 31 Dec 1995	
24468	House, 68 Macartney Street	EC Bliss	68	Macartney St	Shire register - 22 Sep 2008	
2864	Blandstown Heritage Precinct			Gt Southern Hwy, Avon Tce, Bland St	Shire register - 31 Dec 1995, Classified by the National Trust Classified 05 Mar 1985,	
5965	House	Constructed from 1850. Small hipped roofed Colonial cottage close to west side of Avon River. The original front casement windows and the barn at the rear remain. Some of the front windows are original, but 2 were custom built in 1974. The house was built two sections: the rooms on either side of the chimney and the first room further east was built first, and the first room further west was built later.	2	Ford St	Shire register - 31 Dec 1995	
2883	Holy Trinity Church	Holy Trinity Church & Hall	Cnr	Newcastle & Pool Sts	Register of the National Estate Permanent 21 Mar 1978 Aboriginal Heritage Sites Register Recorded, Classified by the National Trust Classified 05 Mar 1985, Shire register - 31 Dec 1995	
5996	House	Constructed from 1859	4	Pool St	Shire register - 31 Dec 1995	
2882	Two Houses and Grounds	At the rear of Police Quarters (fmr), Courthouse and Police Station Cottages. Constructed from 1910.	124	Avon Tce	Aboriginal Heritage Sites Register Recorded, Classified by the National Trust Classified 05 Mar 1985, Register of the National Estate Adopted 21 Mar 1978, Shire register - 31 Dec 1995, State Register Interim 28 Aug 1992	
18862	House 17 Pool Street	Butterfly Cottage	17	Pool St	Shire register - 22 Sep 2008	
18875	House 7 View Street		7	View St	Shire register - 22 Sep 2008	
2899	York railway station (fmr)		13	Railway St	Shire register - 31 Dec 1995, Register of the National Estate Registered 21 Mar 1978, Classified by the National Trust Classified 25 Sep 1985, State Register Permanent 30 Aug 2002	
4200	Four Julias- House	Constructed from 1893	46	South St	Register of the National Estate Registered 21 Mar 1978, Classified by the National Trust Classified 3 May 1985, Shire register - 31 Dec 1995	
5967	The Mount	Constructed from 1910. Large federation house originally containing 17 rooms. It has a complex layout and roof form and extensive decorative timberwork. The building is on an elevated site and can be seen from a large area of town.	29	Fraser St	Municipal Inventory Adopted 31 Dec 1995 (Shire of York)	
2823	Avon Terrace Precinct			Avon Tce	Classified by the National Trust Classified 3 May 1985, RHP - To be assessed Current 31 Oct 2003	
18849	House 19 Meares Street	Brick residence in Victorian Georgian Style with corrugated iron hipped roof. Features verandah, symmetrical façade and quoins to openings. Some alterations appear to have been undertaken.	19	Meares St	Shire register - 22 Sep 2008	
2855	York Post Office	York Post & Telegraph Office. Constructed 1893. Architect George Temple-Poole. Federation Arts and Crafts style.	134	Avon Tce	Aboriginal Heritage Sites Register Recorded, Classified by the National Trust Classified, Register of the National Estate Permanent 21 Mar 1978, Shire register - 31 Dec 1995 State Register Permanent 09 Feb 1996	York Post Office
18873	House 17 Tenth Road		17	Tenth Rd	Shire register - 22 Sep 2008	
23467	Monger's Yard	Including Monger's Store, Old Bakery, Sandalwood Yard and Wagon Yard and Horse Stalls. It is the only known complex associated with the sandalwood industry in Western Australia that remains extant. The Wagon Yards and Horse Stalls have particular social value as they were the subject of community action in 1980 to ensure their conservation.	165	Avon Tce	Shire register - 22 Sep 2008	
23468	Hartleap	Constructed from 1880 to 1910. Built in the 1880s by Charles Edwards, a prominent figure in the community. The house, with its earlier cottage dating from the 1850s and the extensive stone and brick farm buildings demonstrates the life style of a prosperous farming establishment. Single storey house with rendered brick walls to sill height and tuck pointed brick above. Tiled hipped and gable roof with timber effect to gable. Asymmetrical façade with double hung, timber windows and timber front door with fanlight and sidelights and some leadlight glazing. The house sits on a limestone plinth. The verandah is under a broken back roof supported by turned timber posts with decorative timber brackets. A timber framed corrugated iron clad awning sits above the front room windows. Rendered decorative recesses are located under the verandah in the front wall. A limestone retaining wall with a timber picket fence creates a courtyard in front of the house and limestone and brickpaved steps lead from the footpath to the verandah. A second house has been constructed at the rear of the site and is connected by a carport to the rear of the house. A rambling red brick house with high corrugated iron roof and extensive wooden verandahs. Decorated gable ends and turreted roof forms enhance the character of the house, typically Victorian but rare in York.		Forrest St	Municipal Inventory Adopted 04 Feb 2003 (Shire of York)	
13529	Burges Siding	Burgess Siding		Burgess Siding Rd off Northam Rd	Municipal Inventory Adopted 01 Jul 1998 (Shire of York)	
5968	Lavender Cottage	Constructed from 1880. Small worker's cottage originally built as an identical twin cottage on the adjoining lot. The lot consists of a very old flowering tree in the front garden. Cottage originally built for railway workers.	6	Georgina St	Shire register - 31 Dec 1995	
5966	Recreation Area / York Pony Club	This site was the first inland golf club in Western Australia. Constructed from 1843.	bounded by	Ford & Dinsdale Sts & Ulster Rd	Shire register - 31 Dec 1995	
18872	House 9 Tenth Road		9	Tenth Rd	Shire register - 22 Sep 2008	
24466	House, 67 Panmure Road		67	Panmure Rd	Shire register - 22 Sep 2008	
5989	Lott's Cottage	Constructed from 1868. Small hipped roof cottage in the local vernacular architecture with a verandah and decorative timberwork. The cottage is set amongst mature peppercorn trees and has a traditional picket fence. It makes a considerable contribution to the streetscape.	3029	Northam-York Rd	Shire register - 31 Dec 1995	
6905	Clementine Cottage	Constructed from 1890. A symmetrical red brick house with corrugated iron roof and timber framed verandah across the front.	13	Redmile Rd	Register of the National Estate Registered 21 Mar 1978, Shire register - 31 Dec 1995	
5970	Gilgerring Hamlet - Site	The site was once occupied by a small hamlet/railway siding. Evidence of the York to Beverley Road, which previously crossed the site and the footings of the former bridge over Oakover Creek can be seen. The remains of the historic St. Peter's Church (1858) and the Gilgerring school are adjacent to the site.	Lot 342	Great Southern Hwy	Shire register - 31 Dec 1995	
5963	Mile Pool Homestead	also known as Craig's cottage. Constructed from 1865. The home is close to Mile Pool and the farmland is linked to land once used in 1851 as part of the Wesleyan native mission “Gerald Mission”. The land on the west bank opposite to the homestead was reported in the Eastern Districts Chronicle to be used for native corroborees. The ruins of the building remain. The remains are near areas of new residential and subdivision development. The physical evidence indicated three stages of development. The original building was a two roomed rammed earth cottage. Two additional rooms and entry steps were added in stone at the river façade. The rammed earth wall has been extended in height. A lean-to extension has been added in brick at the rear.		Cowan Rd	Shire register - 31 Dec 1995	
18826	House 15 Carter Road					
18853	House 24 Newcastle Street	Brick residence with corrugated iron roof and verandah. Linked with Elm Cottage and Marwick's Barn across the road.	24	Newcastle St	Shire register - 22 Sep 2008	
18856	House 28 Newcastle Street	Weatherboard clad residence with bullnose front verandah.	28	Newcastle St	Shire register - 22 Sep 2008	
5997	House	Construction from 1858.	7	Pool St	Shire register - 31 Dec 1995	
2838	Central Buildings	A range of single storey shops built up to the pavement over the period 1892 to 1907 with rendered parapets and cantilevered awnings replacing the original verandahs over the pavement, one shop in earlier times being a bank. Prior to that, a building on the site was a residence for the prominent Methodist Minister, the Rev. William Lowe.	105-113	Avon Tce	Register of the National Estate Registered 21 Mar 1978, Classified by the National Trust Classified 05 Mar 1985, Shire register - 31 Dec 1995	
23466	Sandalwood Yards		Cnr	Avon Tce and Ford St	Shire register - 22 Sep 2008	
2876	Faversham House	Constructed from 1837 to 1844 with the final additions in 1907. Faversham House is a two-storey stone residence with timber floors and corrugated iron roof. It was built and extended by successive generations of the Monger family. As one of the larger residential complexes in York with a total of almost fifty rooms, the scale of Faversham House makes this a rare example of Colonial architecture.	24	Grey St	Classified by the National Trust Classified 01 Nov 1976, Register of the National Estate Registered 21 Mar 1978, Shire register - 31 Dec 1995 State Register Permanent 02 Sep 1997	Faversham House
18857	House 37 Newcastle Street	Constructed from 1930. Fibro and tile residence, in the Art Deco Style, featured curved walls.	37	Newcastle St	Shire register - 22 Sep 2008	
4201	Anglican Rectory and Grounds	Constructed from 1875		Suburban St	Shire register - 31 Dec 1995, Classified by the National Trust Classified 05 Mar 1985	
2863	Castle Hotel & Outbuildings	Two-storey brick & iron Federation Filigree style hotel.	95 -97	Avon Tce	Shire register - 31 Dec 1995 Classified by the National Trust Classified 05 Mar 1985, Register of the National Estate Permanent 21 Mar 1978	Castle Hotel
6903	Faversham Barns	A range of brick buildings, formerly the barns and farm buildings of John Henry Monger and Faversham House, the adjacent large house built by Monger. The barns date from c1840 and later have undergone much change.	24	Grey St	Shire register - 31 Dec 1995	
24469	House, 93 Panmure Road		93	Panmure Rd	Shire register - 22 Sep 2008	
5974	Fonthill	Constructed from 1885. Built as a residence for the prominent Methodist Minister, the Rev. William Lowe. The Wesleyan work in Perth was taken up by Rev. William Lowe from Adelaide in March. 1851 when John Smithies and his wife Hannah moved to York in September of that year to open “Gerald Mission”. Gerald Mission failed and Smithies was appointed to Hobart in March 1855. Lowe later moved to York to manage the Wesleyan interests in the town. Two storey bungalow with hipped roof and verandahs. Detailed cast iron decoration on the verandah, balustrades and posts.	17	Grey St	Shire register - 31 Dec 1995	
18837	Croquet Club	York Croquet Club since 1909	8	Glebe St	Shire register - 22 Sep 2008	
18863	House 19 Pool Street		19	Pool St	Shire register - 22 Sep 2008	
2834	House	Monger Cottage. Constructed from 1870. A single storied stone house with rendered quoins, hipped roof now covered in corrugated iron and timber front verandah roofed as an extension of the main roof. A transitional house retaining the stone walls, symmetry and simplicity of the earliest cottages, architecturally important for this reason.	51	Avon Tce	Shire register - 31 Dec 1995, Register of the National Estate Nominated 21 Mar 1978, Classified by the National Trust Classified 01 Apr 1985	
14564	Gilgering Siding Bridge over Avon River (ruins)	MRWA 4169		Oakover Rd	Statewide Lge Timber Str Survey Completed 11 Dec 1998	
5985	House	Constructed from 1860. Historic evidence suggests that the cellar was once used for curing meats. The building may also have been used as a coaching house or small hotel. Scientific value suggests the building contains evidence of a type of small scale cottage industry that was occurring in York at the turn of the century. James and Johannah Whiteley were the first owners. Irish pensioner guard. Original Victorian Georgian possibly with later addition. Brick residence, painted or rendered with corrugated iron roof. Large gabled roofed dwelling with a bullnose verandah and two large cellars.	53	Newcastle St	Shire register - 31 Dec 1995	
5978	Peppercorn Cottage	Constructed from 1860. A small hipped roofed cottage with a verandah located close to the road verge. Restored after damaged by the 1968 earthquake.	68	Henry Rd	Shire register - 31 Dec 1995	
2826	House and Gardens	Constructed from 1860.	17a	Avon Tce	Classified by the National Trust Classified 05 Mar 1985, Register of the National Estate Registered 21 Mar 1978	
2886	Kairey Cottage	Built in 1858, this was one of York's original Pensioner Guards' cottages. It was first occupied by John Kairey of the 84th Regiment.	22	New St	Register of the National Estate Permanent 21 Mar 1978, Classified by the National Trust Classified 05 Mar 1985, Shire register - 31 Dec 1995	
18876	House 13 View Street	Simmonswood Cottage	13	View St	Municipal Inventory Adopted 22 Sep 2008 (Shire of York)	
2852	York Police Station, Court House & Gaol	Old York Courthouse and Police Station, York Courthouse Complex	124	Avon Tce	Classified by the National Trust Classified 05 Mar 1985, Aboriginal Heritage Sites Register Recorded, Register of the National Estate Permanent 21 Mar 1978, Shire register - 31 Dec 1995 State Register Permanent 16 Dec 1994	
5992	House	Constructed from 1900. Substantial residence with stylistic features dating from Federation period with timber detail, gables and stucco/rendered work.	24	Panmure Rd	Shire register - 31 Dec 1995	
2845	Commercial Building	Australasia Bank (fmr). Constructed from 1879. Single storey stone building with red brick dressings to openings and a corrugated iron roof. Located on a corner site and built right up to the pavement. Attached residence at rear. Built as Bank of Australasia, at various times has been used as a bank, undertakers, dentist and residence. An interesting building showing only a few signs of its age. A good use of indigenous materials.	155	Avon Tce	Classified by the National Trust Classified 05 Mar 1985, Register of the National Estate Registered 21 Mar 1978, Shire register - 31 Dec 1995	
23469	Hillside	An imposing large house built in 1916 by Charles Edwards who earlier, in the 1880s had also constructed the adjacent Hartleap House. The two houses, from differing stylistic periods, demonstrate great similarity and only subtle changes in detail. They show the continuing prosperity of a successful farming and business family. The apartness of these two houses sited together on high open land overlooking the town but not part of the town is indicative of Edwards their builder who fulfilled for York what Bland and Monger had founded – a thriving and unified commercial centre. A large red brick house with terracotta tiled roof, decorated gables and encircling timber verandahs. Architect JJ Talbot Hobbs	15	Forrest St	Shire register - 22 Sep 2008	
5979	House	Constructed from 1950. Large architect designed dwelling on a well landscaped site.	45	Henry Rd	Shire register - 31 Dec 1995	
4565	Arnold Park House	Constructed from 1897.		Ovens Rd, Talbot Brook via		
5973	Ruins, York Road, Southoban property	Ruin of the original stone building used to house convicts. The convict station is believed to be associated with the construction of the Perth to York road. Constructed from 1860.	3381	Great Southern Hwy	Shire register - 31 Dec 1995	
2862	York Town Centre Precinct			Macartney, Lowe, South, Avon, Broome Sts & Railway Line	Classified by the National Trust Classified 05 Mar 1985, Shire register - 31 Dec 1995, Register of the National Estate Registered 21 Mar 1978,	
14880	Gwambygine Farm and Pool	Gwambygine Homestead comprises a single-storey homestead (c.1836-7 with additions), remains of a tennis court (1890s), a stone barn/shearing shed (date unknown), a c.1949-50 concrete block garage, iron machine shed, post and rail stock pens, sheep dip, pigsty, chicken house, and remains of garden beds and an orchard.		Intersection of Ovens Rd & Great Southern Hwy	Shire register - 22 Sep 2008, Register of the National Estate Indicative Place State Register Permanent 16 May 2008	
3980	Monger's Trading Post (fmr)	Sandalwood Yard	165	Avon Tce	Shire register - 22 Sep 2008 State Register Permanent 15 Dec 2000	
5984	Stone Grange	Constructed from 1865. The builder was a pensioner guard, Stephen Hogan. A cottage with a very high pitched gable roof and a front verandah. The building is distinguished by having an interior ceiling height of close to 7 metres and high quality exterior stonework. The building's design features elements of Georgian architecture and the local vernacular style.	29	Newcastle St	Shire register - 31 Dec 1995	
2835	Spencers Bakery (fmr)	Constructed from 1880. This is the end shop of the group in Avon Terrace. The high foundation steps to entrance from Avon Terrace. The brick addition is the newest part of this building. Now a residence.	53	Avon Tce	Register of the National Estate Registered 21 Mar 1978, Classified by the National Trust Classified 25 Sep 1985, Shire register - 31 Dec 1995	
23471	Shops, 117-119 Avon Terrace	Constructed from 1900.	117 - 119	Avon Tce	Shire register - 31 Dec 1995	
2809	Collins Buildings	A large two storey brick facade with rendered parapet decorated in the Victorian manner and dating from 1907. The original shop fronts have been modernised and the original two storey timber verandah replaced with a cantilevered awning and balconies to the original openings onto the verandah at first floor level.	104-106	Avon Tce	Shire register - 31 Dec 1995, Register of the National Estate Registered 21 Feb 1978, Classified by the National Trust Classified 05 Mar 1985,	
2846	House and Outbuildings	House constructed from 1880.	156-158	Avon Tce	Shire register - 31 Dec 1995, Classified by the National Trust Classified 05 Mar 1985, Register of the National Estate Registered 21 Mar 1978,	
5993	House, AJ Fisher and NL Durston	Four Winds	38	Panmure Rd	Shire register - 31 Dec 1995	
2895	House			Redmile Rd	Classified by the National Trust Classified 01 Apr 1985	
24554	House, 71 Pool Street		87	Centennial Dr	Shire register - 22 Sep 2008	
5987	Prunster Cottage & Barne's Cottage	Constructed from 1870. The dwellings originally formed part of a farm that was later subdivided as York expanded. A carrier business was once operated from the site. These dwellings were associated with the York identities the Prunster and Marwick families. Small cottages in the local vernacular architecture. The dwelling and its grounds with remnant trees from an early orchard on the site makes a substantial addition to the streetscape.	57	Northam Rd	Shire register - 31 Dec 1995	
18874	House 24 Tenth Road		24	Tenth Rd	Shire register - 22 Sep 2008	
13528	Grigson's Well	The well was used to provide water for the school approximately in the 1890s.		Spencers Brook Rd	Municipal Inventory Adopted 01 Jul 1998 (Shire of York)	
2897	House	Constructed from 1890. The brickwork of this house, for the period is unusual as it is built in English bond when Flemish bond was the normal. High roof with symmetrical small pediments on gable ends almost suggests a Georgian approach.	11	South St	Register of the National Estate Nominated 21 Mar 1978, Classified by the National Trust Classified 01 Apr 1985, Register of the National Estate Registered 21 Mar 1978, Shire register - 31 Dec 1995	
2894	House	Kenworthy Cottage. A simple house of architectural significance in the Victorian style. A symmetrically planned brick house, now rendered, with corrugated iron roof and decorated timber verandahs to the front and sides, built in the 1890s. The verandah roof, originally in warped iron, survives in part. A small suburban style of house set back a short distance from the street in a quiet street off Avon Street.	22	Redmile Rd	Shire register - 31 Dec 1995, Register of the National Estate Registered 21 Mar 1978, Classified by the National Trust Classified 01 Apr 1985, Register of the National Estate Nominated 21 Mar 1978	
18824	House, 112 Bland Street	formerly House 16 Bland Street. Constructed from 1900. Brick residence with corrugated iron hipped roof and skillion-roofed verandah with timber posts and some brackets and balustrade.	112	Bland Rd	Shire register - 22 Sep 2008	
3019	Old York Hospital Heritage Precinct	The Old York Hospital is a two-storey building constructed, in 1896, to provide improved hospital facilities for the township of York and the surrounding district. The site also comprises a number of other buildings including: former Morgue, former Laundry (1942), former Nurses' Quarters (1925), and former Maternity Block (1941). Architect George Temple Poole, Federation Arts and Crafts style.		Brook St	Shire register - 22 Sep 2008, State Register Permanent 31 May 1996	
2828	Albion Hotel & Grounds (fmr)	A two-storey brick building with two storied timber verandahs and a single storied annexe (the bar) built c1859. It was originally constructed as a hotel with a large cellar. First licensed as a hotel to W. Edgar in 1861. The building built right up originally to the road, is located on high ground above Bland's Brook in a picturesque and wooded setting. Now a residence.	17-19	Avon Tce	Shire register - 31 Dec 1995, Register of the National Estate Registered 25 Sep 1985, Classified by the National Trust Classified 05 Mar 1985	
2837	Shops	Constructed from 1903.	108-112	Avon Tce	Shire register - 31 Dec 1995 Register of the National Estate Registered 21 Mar 1978, Classified by the National Trust Classified 05 Mar 1985	
18836	House 1 Glebe Street		1	Glebe St	Shire register - 22 Sep 2008	
2891	War Memorial, York	Monument and Park, York; Fallen Soldier's Mem, York War Memorial		Railway St	Classified by the National Trust Classified 01 Apr 1985, Register of the National Estate Nominated 25 Sep 1985, Shire register - 31 Dec 1995 State Register Interim 28 Aug 1992	
18845	House 37 Harriott Street	Painted/rendered brick residence with corrugated iron hipped roof and front verandah. Alterations appear to have been undertaken. (EM Barrett)	37	Harriott St	Shire register - 22 Sep 2008	
18854	House 26 Macartney Street	Simple Georgian residence with corrugated iron hipped roof, front verandah and rendered dado, symmetrical form.	26	Macartney St	Shire register - 22 Sep 2008	
18838	House 35 Grey Street	Constructed from 1900. Substantial red brick residence on a corner block with bull-nosed verandah. Features gables, decorative timber details and rendered/stucco work.	35	Grey St	Shire register - 22 Sep 2008	
14668	York Fire Station	Originally constructed for the York Municipal Council as Council Chambers in 1897. Architect Christian Mouritzen. Converted for use as a fire station in 1912.	191	Avon Tce	Fire & Rescue Service Heritage Inventory Adopted 30 Aug 1997	Fire Station
2892	Redmile House & Grounds	Two separate buildings forming part of the same house, significant architecturally as examples of early housing, the 1853 house to the east demonstrating the typical range of single depth rooms accessible from a protective verandah, and the later 1870s house demonstrating the development to square plan with front verandah and rear lean-to. The house was established by S Redmile. O Sargeant, a botanist was a later occupant.	2-12	Redmile Rd	Classified by the National Trust Classified 25 Sep 1985, Register of the National Estate Registered 31 Mar 1978, Shire register - 31 Dec 1995	
2875	Bygraves House & Shop	Constructed from 1884. Originally house and bootmakers shop, at present it is a residence.		Great Southern Hwy	Register of the National Estate Permanent 21 Mar 1978, Classified by the National Trust Classified, Shire register - 31 Dec 1995	
2902	House	Kitty-Paw. Constructed from 1860. Associated with Wheeler Brothers, original wheelwright settlers in York. Small four roomed cottage, built for rental, constructed with brick walls and high shingled roof in a symmetrical front protected by a simple verandah. Some alterations to timber detail and the addition of a lean-to at the back have altered the simple character of the building.	12	Wheeler St	Shire register - 31 Dec 1995 Register of the National Estate Registered 21 Mar 1978, Classified by the National Trust Classified 01 Apr 1985,	
3967	Wagon Yard & Horse Stalls			Avon Tce		
18834	House 44 Ford Street	Constructed from 1900. Red brick residence in the Federation style with rendered band. The place has a wrap-around verandah with decorative timber posts and valance.	44	Ford St	Shire register - 22 Sep 2008	
18847	House 11 Lincoln Street	Simple brick residence with corrugated iron hipped roof and verandah. Appears to be in Victorian Georgian Style. Symmetrical form. (AS Kington)	11	Lincoln St	Shire register - 22 Sep 2008	
2842	Dinsdale's Shoe Emporium	Constructed 1887 by William Dinsdale. Architect James William Wright. Subsequently, Mrs Pyke's Temperance Hotel; Kookaburra's Backpackers; Shops (fmr) & Residence over; restored 2017. Bldg Behind constructed around 1857.	152	Avon Tce	Register of the National Estate Registered 21 Mar 1978, Classified by the National Trust Classified 05 Mar 1985, Shire register - 31 Dec 1995	
2881	Masonic Hall	Constructed from 1887. An imposing two-storey stone building with corrugated iron roof and stuccoed front wall decorated in the Victorian Classical revival style including a high parapeted facade built up to the street boundary without boundary verandahs. Architect James William Wright.		Joaquina St	Shire register - 31 Dec 1995 Classified by the National Trust Classified 01 Apr 1984, Register of the National Estate Registered 21 Mar 1978,	
10518	Settlers House	Temperance House, Jules, Elders Real Estate, Vacant Shop	125-135	Avon Tce	Register of the National Estate Registered 21 Mar 1978, Classified by the National Trust Classified 3 May 1985, Shire register - 31 Dec 1995	
5998	House - The Roundhouse	Constructed from 1985. A modern octagonally shaped building located on a semi-rural block of land. It was built by a pair of American potters who later returned to the US.	38	Spencers Brook Rd	Shire register - 31 Dec 1995	
2885	York Cemetery		Cnr	Herbert & Sydney Rds	Register of the National Estate Permanent 21 Mar 1978, Shire register - 31 Dec 1995	
5983	House	Simple brick residence with corrugated iron hipped roof and verandah. Appears to be in Victorian Georgian Style. Symmetrical form. Alterations and additions appear to have been undertaken. R Crane, Cottage Garden	14	Meares St	Shire register - 22 Sep 2008	
18829	House 33 Clifford Street	Constructed from 1910.	33	Clifford St	Shire register - 22 Sep 2008	
2839	Bendigo Bank	Constructed from 1930. Simple classical façade. Commonwealth Banking Corporation (fmr)	114	Avon Tce	Shire register - 31 Dec 1995	
5975	Glen Irwin Farmhouse, Vacant Dwelling / Storeroom and Stock Shelter, Sheep Dip	Glen Irwin / Homestead and Shearing Shed. One of the early farm buildings in the district. It replaced an earlier farmhouse located nearby. It is a reminder of pioneer settlement along the Avon River in the mid-1840s. Small building made of local materials. It is set amongst Almond and Mulberry trees and a spring is nearby. An in ground structure, which used to be used to dip sheep.	Off	Gwambygine Rd	Shire register - 31 Dec 1995	
2844	CWA House	Constructed in 1855 as a house and butcher's shop by Robert Doncon. Purchased by Richard Goldsmith Meares in 1857.	154	Avon Tce	Shire register - 31 Dec 1995 Classified by the National Trust Classified 05 Mar 1985, Register of the National Estate Registered 21 Mar 1978,	
2873	Hillside Farmhouse & Hartleap Farmhouse Group	Heartleap	30	Forrest St	Register of the National Estate Indicative Place, Classified by the National Trust Classified 01 Apr 1985, Register of the National Estate Nominated 25 Sep 1985, Shire register - 31 Dec 1995	
5980	Kingdom Hall	This was the first place of worship that was built in the country in 24 hours. Kingdom Hall built in a style which has elements of the local vernacular architecture of residential buildings. These include its verandah and porch, the stucco quoins and window surrounds.	9	Knight St	Shire register - 31 Dec 1995	
23481	House, 54 Macartney Street	Simple brick residence with corrugated iron hipped roof and verandah. Appears to be in Victorian Georgian Style. Symmetrical form. (PS & PL Higginson)	54	Macartney St	Shire register - 22 Sep 2008	
18835	House 13 George Street	Avonlea. Red brick residence with corrugated iron roof. The gable section has timber details and there is a front verandah. The garden has a mature pine tree located at the front of the dwelling.	13	George St	Shire register - 22 Sep 2008	
2865	Bridge over Blands Brook	Bridge No 291. A water course flowing east into the Avon River; as summer proceeds, the brook ponds and in parts dries up on the surface. The rich soil and fresh water support lush natural ground. The brook meanders under the road bridge and across the paddocks of the Balladong Farm.		Avon Tce	Shire register - 31 Dec 1995 Classified by the National Trust Classified 05 Mar 1985, Register of the National Estate Registered 21 Mar 1978	
18877	House 150 Bland Road	House 24 Bland Road (fmr). Simple residence in Victorian Georgian style, either painted or rendered, with corrugated iron hipped roof and verandah. Appears to have been altered/added to.	150	Bland Rd	Shire register - 22 Sep 2008	
2859	Building		155	Avon Tce		
18871	House 58 Suburban Road		58	Suburban Rd	Shire register - 22 Sep 2008	
2824	House	Cartref Cottage. Constructed from 1888. A brick house with gable ended iron roof, built in two sections, the northern section about 1888 at right angles to the original earlier cottage. Both sections contain verandahs across the front of a single line of rooms. The house is located close to the road which travels south to Beverley.	7	Avon Tce	Register of the National Estate Nominated 21 Mar 1978, Classified by the National Trust Classified 05 Mar 1985, Shire register - 31 Dec 1995	
2831	Bakery & Residence (fmr)	House and Outbuildings. A rendered brick house, constructed c1860, as a range of rooms of single room depth with verandah across the front, high pitched gabled roof and separate outbuildings. The house was once tuck-pointed red brick externally. It had wooden internal ceilings. Part of the large underground tank system which provided water for the house and bakery still remains. The bakehouse, covered well and outbuilding stand apart to the rear of the house. The original store was in the two south-east rooms, originally one large room with its own fireplace. The uneven floor levels throughout the house indicate consideration additions over the years. Most of the roof shingles are still in place under the corrugated iron and many convict marked bricks have been found. Most of the original bricks were baked in a kiln slightly to the south-west. There is no damp course in the original building. The present bathroom was once the pantry and the two outside rooms are a later addition showing signs of a damp course. A row of tack rooms along the back fence was demolished soon after World War II.	29	Avon Tce	Shire register - 31 Dec 1995 Classified by the National Trust Classified 05 Mar 1985, Register of the National Estate Registered 21 Mar 1978,	
5971	Look out (McQuades Place)	Original farm, once a part of the Mt. Hardy Estate. Constructed from 1890. Small hipped roof cottage with verandahs on three sides of the house, located on land running down to the Avon River. Internal walls made with locally made bricks without mortar.		Top Beverley Rd	Shire register - 31 Dec 1995	
4429	St Ronan's Well Reserve	also known as St Ronan's Nature Reserve. St Ronan's Well, 15 km west of York became an established watering place on the road to York as early as 1832, and it appears highly likely that a well was in place at the site by 1832.		Great Southern Highway	Shire Register, Register of the National Estate Permanent 24 Sep 2002	
18846	House 44 Henry Road	Constructed from 1900. Red brick residence in the Federation Style with wrap around verandah. Alterations appear to have been undertaken. (JD & LM Gargett)	44	Henry Rd	Shire register - 22 Sep 2008	
2866	Old Cemetery Site	St John's Anglican Church (fmr). Headstones have been relocated and laid out to form the footprint of the c.1842 St John's Church, which was relocated in 1901 to Holy Trinity Anglican Church, York (1854) as that church's hall. Despite the relocation of headstones, the original burials remain in situ.	Cnr	Balladong St & Avon Tce	Shire register - 31 Dec 1995 Classified by the National Trust Classified 21 Sep 1976, Register of the National Estate Permanent 21 Mar 1978	
2832	House	Constructed 1890. This house was originally used as a sitting come music room for 29 Avon Terrace. It is also the location of one of the earliest schooling sites. This school certainly pre-dated the present house and was conducted by Mr George Pope. The small brick and stone Edwardian house was built on part of the block originally consisting of 29 Avon Terrace, by some members of the family who owned 29 Avon Terrace. The block was subdivided from the larger block and in 1911 a large room of brick was built close to the adjoining house. It had an ornate side door, which has now been converted to a window. A brick and stone house with brick quoins. The building has a characteristic high pitched corrugated iron roof, decorative verandah at the front, decorated gable and window canopy. By 1919 three more stone rooms had been added to the large brick room, adjoined by a small passageway. A front and back verandah was added (iron lace decorating the front). Much later the back verandah was converted to a bathroom and laundry. Missing is a large curved awning from the front window of the brick room. In 1992 it was thought to be causing cracking in that wall and was removed.	31	Avon Tce	Municipal Inventory Adopted 31 Dec 1995 (Shire of York), Register of the National Estate Registered 21 Mar 1978, Classified by the National Trust Classified 05 Mar 1985,	
2854	Davies Buildings	Constructed from 1908.	96-102	Avon Tce	Classified by the National Trust Classified 05 Mar 1985, Register of the National Estate Registered 21 Mar 1978, Shire register - 31 Dec 1995	Davies Buildings
5972	Top of the World Hill	This site offers the first view of the Avon Valley on the road from Perth.		Great Southern Hwy	Shire register - 31 Dec 1995	
5990	House	Constructed from 1859. One of only a small number of farmhouses remaining with the original period of settlement. The building was constructed by a pensioner guard assigned to oversee the first convict labour sent to the district. Small hipped roofed cottage with a surrounding verandah. The building has been substantially extended in recent times using traditional mud brick building materials. A number of mudbrick outhouses remain separate from the original dwelling.	2	Osnaburg Rd	Shire register - 31 Dec 1995	
2878	St Patrick's Catholic Church, Presbytery & Hall	St Patrick's Catholic Church, Presbytery and Hall is a group of three ecclesiastical buildings and an outbuilding comprising Church Hall (Old Church, 1859), a single storey rendered brick and iron building, in the vernacular with influences of Victorian Gothic style; St Patrick's Church (1875+), a double volume stone and slate building with four level tower, in the Victorian Academic Gothic style; and, the Presbytery (1877; 1894), a single storey stone and corrugated iron dwelling with influences of Victorian Rustic Gothic style. The outbuilding, in brick with an iron roof over shingles, was possibly built as stables in association with the Church Hall (Old Church) and early priest quarters (a lean-to attached to the Old Church) and could date from the 1860s or 1870s. Foundation stone was laid for the original Church in 1887 by Bishop Gibney. Ceiling work was done by a Mr Prunster from Austria. Italian craftsmen added the stone porch in 1950.	22	South St	Shire register - 31 Dec 1995 Classified by the National Trust Classified 05 Mar 1985, Register of the National Estate Permanent 21 Mar 1978, State Register Permanent 18 May 2004	St Patrick's Church
18864	House 21 Pool Street		21	Pool St	Shire register - 22 Sep 2008	
10725	Imperial Hotel	Imperial Hotel, York is a two-storey stone and iron hotel premise, with outbuildings, consisting of the former Stables and Second-class Lodgers Accommodation, constructed in 1886.	83	Avon Tce	Classified by the National Trust Classified 05 Mar 1985, Register of the National Estate Permanent 21 Mar 1978, State Register Permanent 13 Jul 2007 Shire register - 31 Dec 1995	Imperial Hotel
10708	Sargent's Pharmacy (fmr)	Constructed in 1904.	91-93	Avon Tce	Register of the National Estate Permanent 21 Mar 1978, Classified by the National Trust Adopted 05 Mar 1985, Shire register - 31 Dec 1995	Sargent's Pharmacy
11551	York & Districts Co-Op & Quarters	York District Farmers' Cooperative, Edwards General Store	138	Avon Tce	Register of the National Estate Registered 21 Mar 1978, Shire register - 31 Dec 1995 State Register Permanent 08 Jan 2010	
5982	Pioneer Memorial Lodge		50	Macartney St		
18878	House 11 Tenth Road		11	Tenth Rd	Shire register - 22 Sep 2008	
2861	York Palace Hotel	York Hotel, Palace Hotel (fmr) Constructed from 1909. Typical country hotel of the early 1900s with later upgrade and re-introduction of balcony and verandah.	145	Avon Tce	Shire register - 31 Dec 1995 Register of the National Estate Registered 21 Mar 1978, Classified by the National Trust Classified 05 Mar 1985	York Palace Hotel
2877	York Primary School	York Mixed, York Junior High School, York Boys School		Howick St	Register of the National Estate Adopted 21 Mar 1978, Classified by the National Trust Classified 01 Apr 1985, Register of the National Estate Nominated 21 Mar 1978, Shire register - 31 Dec 1995 State Register Permanent 23 Nov 2001	
2829	Brook Cottage	Brick House. The original centre section of Brook Cottage was built in 1856. The front and rear sections were added in the 1890s. It consists of six rooms on four levels each having been constructed at separate times. Old section in centre is c1856 and has two rooms with a 350 step has steep pitched roof and sloping walls. Shingle lining boards form the ceiling of the old section. There is a gabled roof with valley gutter adjoining the front section. The front section c1890 has a passage between two rooms, symmetrical and simple face red brick on random stone footings with corrugated iron clad hipped roof and bull-nose dropped verandah with simple timber posts. The rear section c1880 is also of brick on stone footings with painted rendered walls. It has a 150 skillion roof which until 2003 continued over a low open rear verandah. The rear room was added in 2003–2004. There are four face brick chimneys. Renovations to extend the property occurred approximately June 1999, to include its first bathroom, separate toilet and family room.	21	Avon Tce	Shire register - 31 Dec 1995 Classified by the National Trust Classified 15 Feb 1977, Register of the National Estate Registered 21 Mar 1978	
3426	York-Beverley Racecourse			North Rd	Shire register - 31 Dec 1995 State Register Permanent 03 Jun 2005	
2830	Wansbrough House		22	Avon Tce	Municipal Inventory Adopted 04 Apr 1996 (Shire of York), Register of the National Estate Permanent 21 Mar 1978, Classified by the National Trust Classified 05 Sep 1985 State Register Permanent 14 Dec 2001	
18833	House 16 Dinsdale Street	Sunny Hill. Constructed from 1900. Brick or stone residence with corrugat6ed iron hipped roof and wrap around verandah. Features quoins to openings and timber detail to verandah. Additions and alterations have been made to the house.	16	Dinsdale St	Shire register - 22 Sep 2008	
2869	Old York Hospital	Avonmore		Brook St	Register of the National Estate Permanent 21 Mar 1978, Classified by the National Trust Classified, Shire register - 31 Dec 1995	
18478	Well at End of Green Hills Road			Penny Dr, At the end of Green Hills Rd	RHP - Does not warrant assessment Current 19 Apr 2013	
24474	House, 66 Macartney Street	Constructed from 1910. Brick residence with central gable entry. Gable is half-timbered and verandah is brick with column supports. (KG Bell & CB Goward)	66	Macartney St	Shire register - 22 Sep 2008	
18869	House 50 Suburban Road		50	Suburban Rd	Shire register - 22 Sep 2008	
5969	Woodlands	Constructed from 1912.		Goldfields Rd	Shire register - 31 Dec 1995	
18867	House 40 Suburban Road		40	Suburban Rd	Shire register - 22 Sep 2008	
5991	Laurelville	Constructed from 1896. One of the most substantial private buildings in York. The building was originally built for the Leeder family then sold to Marwick family. An extensive Victorian federation era house with a complex building form and roof structure featuring numerous gables and a turret with a tower. Substantial additions were made to the building in the 1980s.	18	Panmure Rd	Register of the National Estate Registered 21 Mar 1978, Shire register - 31 Dec 1995	
5981	Chinaman's Cottage	Constructed from 1910. Original two room cottage remains as a kitchen and living room, a recent two storey extension is attached to the cottage. The building is set within the grounds of a market garden operated by Chinese gardeners.		Lee Cr	Shire register - 31 Dec 1995	
5994	Railway Workers Houses	Constructed from 1950. Evidence of the role of York in WA's railway network. A cohesive group of post WW2 cottages set on large lots with well established gardens.	15-21	Pelham St	Shire register - 31 Dec 1995	
2901	Houses	Wheeler Brothers' Houses. In the 1860s, Robert Wheeler organised for five houses in Wheeler Street to be built. The builders Christie and Wansborough, who are renowned for other houses of great significance, built them in adjacent Blandstown. 4 Wheeler Street was Mr Wheeler's residence. The appearance and present condition of these houses have changed dramatically over the years. Houses 2 and 4 are quite large houses and house 10 is a smaller cottage.	2, 4, 10	Wheeler St	Shire register - 31 Dec 1995	
2898	St. Patrick's Convent School (fmr)	Constructed from 1873. A stone building with high corrugated iron roof, gable ends and projecting porches.	Lots 800-1	South St	Shire register - 31 Dec 1995 Register of the National Estate Registered 21 Mar 1978, Classified by the National Trust Classified 01 Apr 1985,	
23470	Shop, 115 Avon Terrace	Constructed from 1890. Well maintained building. Sandwiched between two dissimilar buildings – thus forming a stop or pause in the streetscape.	115	Avon Tce	Shire register - 31 Dec 1995	
10519	York Motor Museum	Constructed from 1900. A group of shops and a previous commercial premises seen together and unified by a classical parapet with classical cappings and balusters.	116-120	Avon Tce	Shire register - 31 Dec 1995 Classified by the National Trust Adopted 05 Mar 1985, Register of the National Estate Registered 21 Mar 1978, Albany CGI-clad Houses Survey Nominated 29 Sep 1985,	
17602	Stanmere	Brick residence with Victorian Georgian features with corrugated iron roof.	55	Grey St	Shire register - 22 Sep 2008	
2867	Balladong Farm Group	A group of related farm buildings established by Stephen Parker who acquired the farm in 1848. Constructed from 1831. Farmhouse on bank of Bland Creek. The two storied granary with shingled roof joined to a stone walled stable block with shingled roof and bush pole framing, was built in the form of a square cloister opening onto the central courtyard, in 1890. The adjacent shearing shed dating from the 1870s is constructed in timber in the tradition of buildings of their use throughout Australia. A high timber framed roof covered in shingles with lapped timber boarding on timber framing, a battened timber floor raised well above the ground for the containment of sheep.	Cnr	Parker Rd & Avon Tce	Classified by the National Trust Classified 1 May 1985, Register of the National Estate Registered 21 Mar 1978, Shire register - 31 Dec 1995 State Register Permanent 08 Oct 1996	
2860	Old York Fire Station	The Old York Fire Station is a single-storey Federation Free style red brick building constructed for the York Municipal Council as Council Chambers in 1897. After the completion of the York Town Hall in 1911, the building was sold and later converted for use as a Fire Station. Also a Community Centre.	151	Avon Tce	Aboriginal Heritage Sites Register Recorded, Register of the National Estate Registered 21 Mar 1978, Fire & Rescue Service Heritage Inventory Adopted 30 Aug 1997, Classified by the National Trust Classified 05 Mar 1985, Shire register - 31 Dec 1995 State Register Permanent 11 Dec 1998	
2872	York Flour Mill	The York Flour Mill is a purpose-built flour mill, constructed in 1892 with associated buildings built from 1892 onwards, to mill flour for York and the surrounding districts, and for export. The mill is the only remaining mill building in York, a town whose prosperity was built upon the growing wheat and grain. Formerly York Flour Milling Co. Ltd, Empire Roller Flour Mill, Jah Roc Furniture.	10	Henrietta St	Classified by the National Trust Classified 05 Mar 1985, Register of the National Estate Permanent 21 Mar 1978, Shire register - 31 Dec 1995 State Register Permanent 31 Dec 1993	
24471	House, 35 Macartney Street	Simple brick residence with corrugated iron hipped roof and verandah. Appears to be in Victorian Georgian Style. Symmetrical form., (CE Bell)	35	Macartney St	Shire register - 22 Sep 2008	
4525	Avon Valley Landscape Area				Register of the National Estate Indicative Place, Register of the National Estate Nominated 13 Mar 1992, Classified by the National Trust Classified {Lscpe} 03 Dec 1984	
2850	Building			Avon Tce		
2848	Ambulance Building			Avon Terrace		
24532	House, 12 Panmure Road	Brick residence with corrugated iron hipped roof and front verandah.	12	Panmure Rd	Shire register - 22 Sep 2008	
