= List of State Register of Heritage Places in the Shire of York =

List of heritage places in Western Australia

The State Register of Heritage Places is maintained by the Heritage Council of Western Australia. As of 2026, 322 places are heritage-listed in the Shire of York, of which 34 are on the State Register of Heritage Places.

== List ==
The Western Australian State Register of Heritage Places, as of 2026, lists the following 34 state registered places within the Shire of York:

Place name	Place #	Location	Suburb or town	Co-ordinates	Notes & former names	Photo
St Andrew's Anglican Church & Cemetery, Greenhills	2821	Quairading Road	Greenhills	31.9447°S 116.9768°E		
Wansbrough House	2830	22 Avon Terrace	York	31.8968°S 116.7704°E		
York Police Station, Court House & Gaol	2852	124 Avon Terrace	York	31.8887°S 116.7687°E	Old York Courthouse and Police Station, York Courthouse Complex	
York Post Office	2855	134 Avon Terrace	York	31.8884°S 116.7686°E		
Old York Fire Station	2860	151 Avon Terrace	York	31.8876°S 116.7682°E	Council Chambers (former), Community Centre	
Balladong Farm Group	2867	Corner Parker Road & Avon Terrace	York	31.8968°S 116.7704°E		
Eliza's Cottage	2868	9 Revett Place	York	31.89864°S 116.7692°E	Lookout for Trains Cottage, Burtons Cottage	
Old York Hospital	2869	Brook Street	York	31.893°S 116.7747°E	Avonmoore	
Residency Museum	2870	5 Brook Street	York	31.8928°S 116.7754°E	Residency (former) Nursing Quarters	
York Flour Mill	2872	10 Henrietta Street	York	31.8939°S 116.7663°E	Jah Roc Furniture, York Flour Milling Co. Ltd, Empire Roller Flour Mill	
Faversham House	2876	24 Grey Street	York	31.8855°S 116.7663°E		
York Primary School	2877	Howick Street	York	31.8894°S 116.7668°E	York Mixed, York Junior High School, York Boys School	
St Patrick's Catholic Church, Presbytery & Hall	2878	22 South Street	York	31.8903°S 116.7667°E		
Convent of Mercy and School (former)	2879	29 South Street	York	31.8911°S 116.7665°E	Radio 101.3 York FM, Youth Hostel, York Telecentre	
York Town Hall	2880	79-81 Avon Terrace	York	31.8916°S 116.7682°E	& York Roll of Honour	
Two Houses and Grounds	2882	124 Avon Terrace	York	31.8887°S 116.7687°E	Part of York Police Station, Court House & Gaol Precinct (2852), Police Quarters (former), Courthouse and Police Station Cottages	
Holy Trinity Church	2883	Corner Newcastle & Pool Streets	York	31.8865°S 116.7724°E	Holy Trinity Church & Hall	
Marwick's Shed	2884	19-21 Newcastle Street	York	31.8839°S 116.7730°E	Marwicks Barn	
Bridge House & Grounds	2893	Redmile Road	York	31.8937°S 116.7725°E		
St. Patrick's Convent School (former)	2898	Lots 800-1 South Street	York		Part of Convent of Mercy and School (former) Precinct (2879), York Public Library	
York Railway Station (former)	2899	13 Railway Street	York	31.8919°S 116.7658°E		
York Hospital Heritage Precinct	3019	Brook Street	York		Parent place of Old York Hospital (2869) and Residency Museum (2870)	
Holy Trinity Church, Hall & Rectory	3213	Newcastle Street	York		Parent place of Holy Trinity Church (2883) and Anglican Rectory and Grounds (4201)	
York-Beverley Racecourse	3426	North Road	York	31.8613°S 116.7733°E	including Grandstand	
Monger's Trading Post (former)	3980	165 Avon Terrace	York	31.8862°S 116.7682°E	Sandalwood Yard	
St Ronan's Well, York	4183	Great Southern Highway	St Ronans	31.8861°S 116.6022°E	St Ronan's Well and Conservation Area	
Korrawilla Homestead Group	4184	Corner York & Quairading Road	Greenhills	31.9414°S 116.9848°E	Greenhills Farm, Korrawilla	
Anglican Rectory and Grounds	4201	Suburban Street	York		Part of Holy Trinity Church, Hall & Rectory (3213)	
Imperial Hotel	10725	83 Avon Terrace	York	31.8911°S 116.7682°E		
York & Districts Co-Op & Quarters	11551	138 Avon Terrace	York	31.8880°S 116.7687°E	York District Farmers' Cooperative, Edwards General Store	
Gwambygine Farm and Pool	14880	Intersection of Ovens Road & Great Southern Highway	York	31.9809°S 116.8060°E	Gwambygine Homestead	
Sandalwood Yards	23466	Corner Avon Terrace and Ford Street	York		Part of Monger's Trading Post (3980)	
Monger's Yard	23467	165 Avon Terrace	York		Part of Monger's Trading Post (3980)	
Charcoal Burner Site, Mount Observation	25664	526 Yarra Road	Mount Observation	31.9360°S 116.4575°E		

== Former places ==
The following place has been removed from the State Register of Heritage Places within the Shire of York:

Place name	Place #	Location	Suburb or town	Co-ordinates	Deregistered	Notes & former names	Photo
War Memorial, York	2891	Railway Street	York	31.8914°S 116.766°E	1 July 2021	Monument and Park, York, Fallen Soldier's Memorial, York War Memorial	
