= Holy Trinity Church, York, Western Australia =

Church in York, Western Australia

Holy Trinity Anglican Church, York
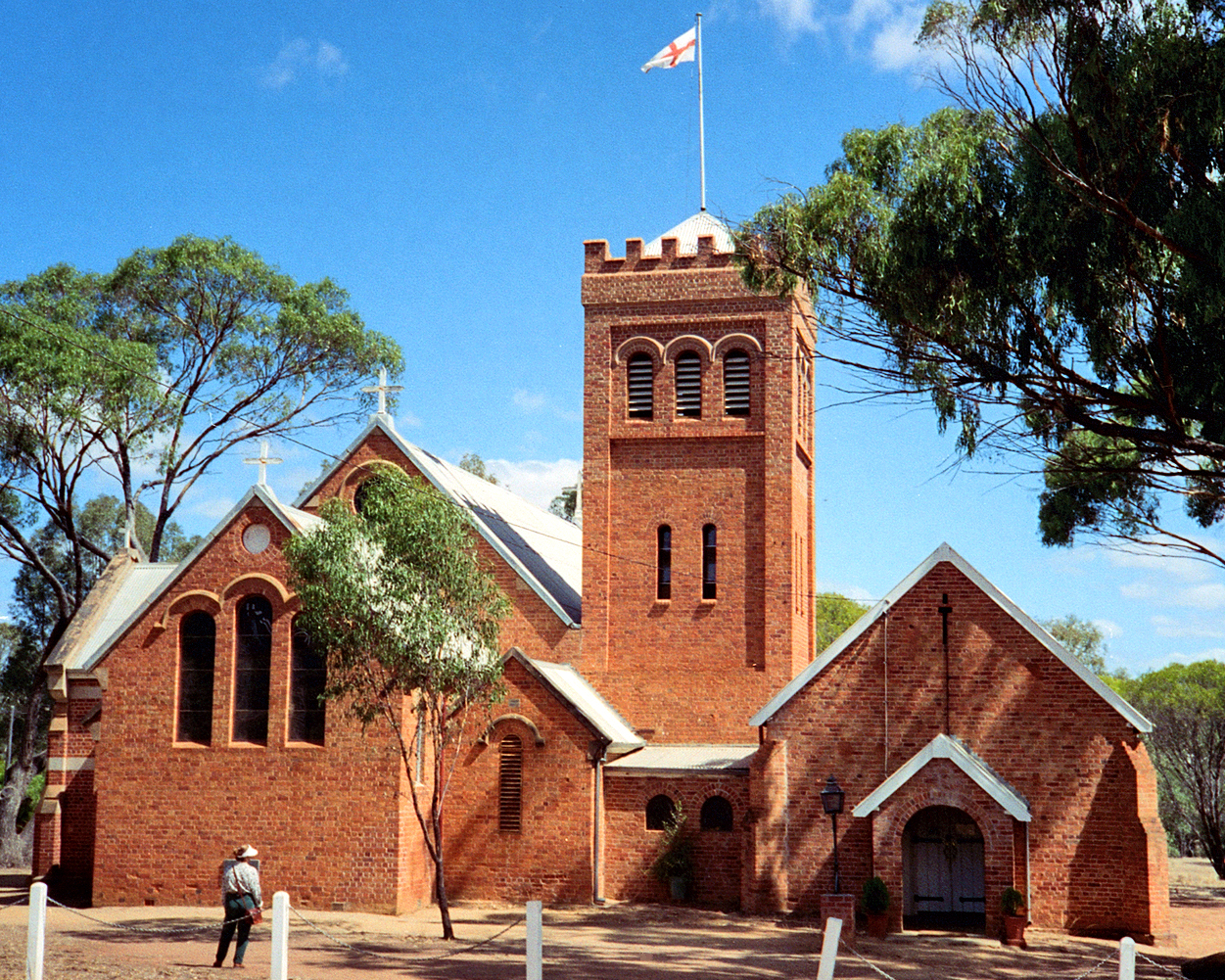
- The church in 1994
- Holy Trinity Anglican Church, York
- 31°53′11″S 116°46′21″E
- Location: Cnr Newcastle and Pool Streets, York, Western Australia
- Country: Australia
- Denomination: Anglican
- Website: Holy Trinity, York

History
- Status: Church
- Founded: 1854
- Dedication: Holy Trinity
- Consecrated: 1858

Architecture
- Functional status: Active
- Architect: Richard Roach Jewell
- Style: Norman, or Victorian Romanesque
- Years built: 1854–55

Specifications
- Materials: Brick, corrugated iron

Administration
- Province: Western Australia
- Diocese: Perth
- Parish: York

Western Australia Heritage Register
- Official name: Holy Trinity Church, Hall & Rectory
- Type: State Registered Place
- Designated: 28 June 1996
- Reference no.: 3213

Holy Trinity Church is a heritage-listed Anglican church on the corner of Newcastle and Pool Streets, in York, Western Australia. The church was consecrated in 1858 by the first Anglican Bishop of Perth, Mathew Blagden Hale.

== Earlier church ==
The first Anglican church in York was built in 1840 by Peter Barrow, on his property in Avon Terrace and consecrated in 1848. It was dedicated to St John. Being made of mud brick and in disrepair, the first building was demolished. A replacement was built at the same site and dedicated in 1861. (Note: The builder of St John's was Henry Stevens, the blacksmith and builder who was paid 104 pounds in August 1860 to construct the church.)

New glebe lands were granted to the parish on the east side of the river in 1849 and a parsonage was built in 1852.

The Holy Trinity church, on the other side of the Avon River was constructed in 1854, and both churches were operating and maintained until 1905 when the second Saint Johns was moved to the Holy Trinity site and became the parish hall.

== Construction ==
The architect was Richard Roach Jewell. The church "was built in the style of the latter part of the 11th century", that is, in Norman style, or Victorian Romanesque. (Note: Refer to the article The Style Council on the website Dodgy Perth for a discussion as to why the style was not Gothic when Pownall and wanted Gothic style, the author believes the lead "consultant" for the design of the church was Colonial Secretary Edward Sanford.) The church was designed to have a "lofty spire" above the tower and to accommodate 250 people.

The foundation stone for the church was laid on 25 October 1854 by Mrs Fitzgerald, the wife of the Governor, Captain Charles Fitzgerald.

Tenders were called between November 1854 and March 1855 for lime, brickwork, "roofing, weather-boarding and shingling", and doors and seats. Construction cost was 1,100 pounds. The tenders for lime were to be submitted to S A Barter of Guildford or John Henry Monger Snr of York. (Note: This indicates that Monger may have been the builder, overseeing construction. In the previous year, he was the contracted builder for the Wesleyan Chapel in York.)

A newspaper article commented that the (convict) workmen "have displayed great interest in their work and deserve much credit for their skill".

The church was opened on 26 October 1855. When first constructed, it consisted of a nave and a small porch.

The church was consecrated in 1858.

In 1893, the roof was raised, and the bell tower, chancel and vestries were added.

== Interior ==
The organ was built by Albert Pearse in London in 1898 and was shipped in parts to Australia to be installed in the church in the same year. the organ was restored in 1998.

The altar and bishop's chair were dedicated to the rector, Edward Williams, who was killed in a horse accident in 1899.

The stained glass windows, installed in 1986, were designed by Robert Juniper. The windows depict traditional religious scenes together with landscapes, flora and fauna and an intermingling of historical events from the Avon Valley.

== First world war ==
Community events commemorating the earlier versions of Anzac Day occurred at the church, and church events during the war continued.

== 1968 Meckering earthquake ==
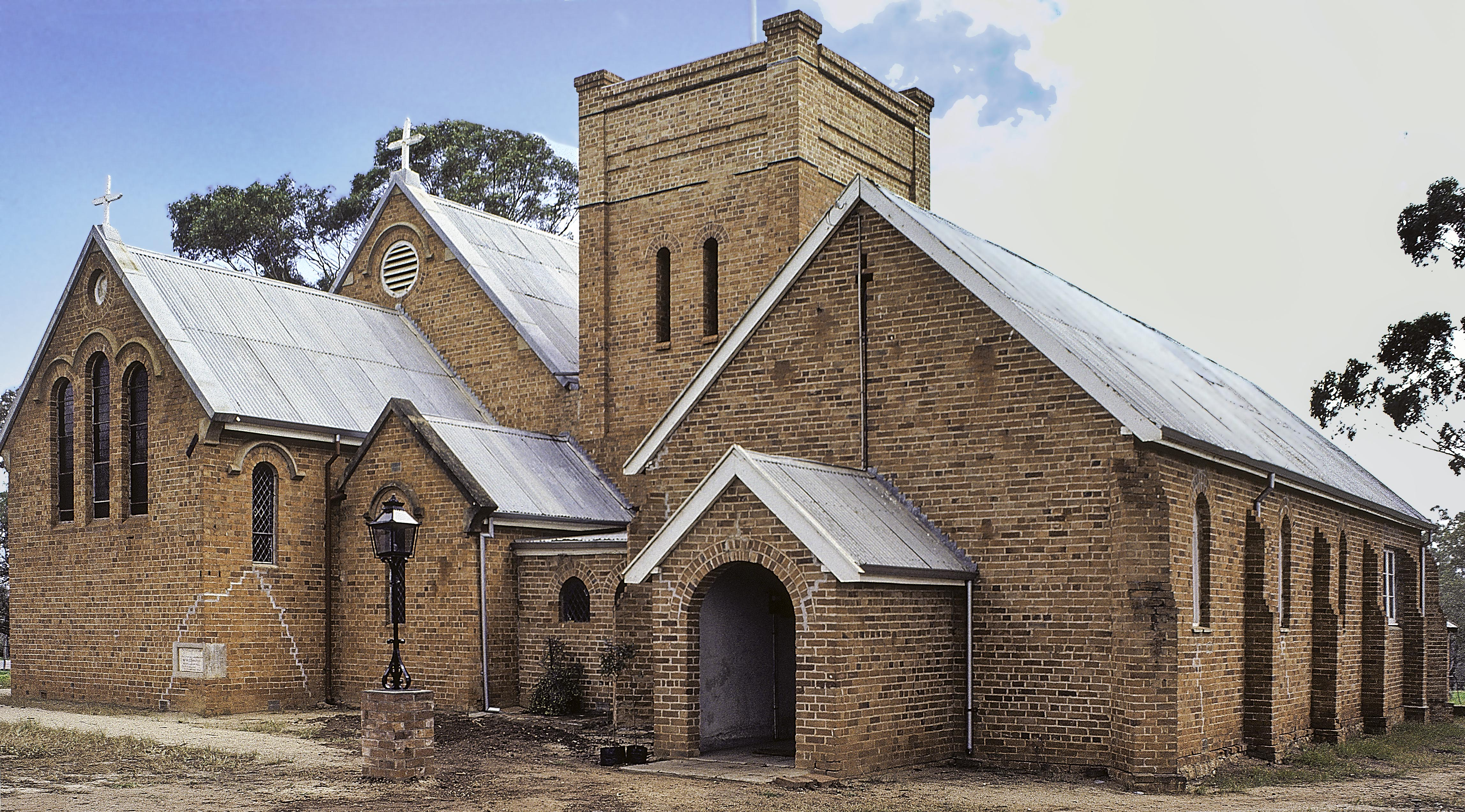
Holy Trinity Church some time after the earthquake, with the bell tower still unfinished.

The 1968 Meckering earthquake seriously damaged the belltower and the height was reduced by about a third. The tower was subsequently rebuilt.

== 1979 cookbook ==
The church community was involved in producing a cookbook in the late 1970s.

== Holy Trinity Church Society ==
In the 1980s and after, the Church Society had a range of talks and publications relating to Anglican Church history and notable figures in that history. The church was also involved in theatrical events in the 1980s.

In the 2000s the church produced a community fixtures calendar.

== Conservation ==
In 1995 a conservation report was done on the buildings related to the church.

== Heritage registration ==
The church and related buildings were permanently added to the State Register of Heritage Places in 1996.

- Anglican Church Inventory, 31 July 1996
- York Municipal Inventory, 31 December 1995
- Classified by the National Trust, 5 March 1985
- Register of the National Estate, 22 March 1978

== See also ==
- List of Anglican churches in Western Australia
- List of State Register of Heritage Places in the Shire of York
