= Arthur Trimmer =

Pioneer settler of Western Australia

Arthur Trimmer (1805–1877) was one of three brothers who were early settlers in the colony of Western Australia. He was the grandson of Sarah Trimmer (1741–1810), an educational reformer and writer.

Arthur's father was William Kirby Trimmer who married Jane Bayne in 1794, with whom he had seven children. He owned a successful brickmaking business and collected fossils. He suffered a stroke in 1810 and died four months later, when Arthur was only five.

An uncle, William Kirby, had built up a flock of merino sheep, as part of a project initiated by Joseph Banks. (Note: Another uncle, James Rustat Trimmer, invested into this project. All three brothers wrote letters to him, which are in the British Library.)

== In Western Australia with his brothers ==
Arthur's elder brother Spencer (born 1803) arrived in Western Australia in October 1829. In partnership with his cousin Douglas Thompson, he selected 15,000 hectares (37,000 acres) in the Avon District and 400 hectares (1,000 acres) in the Swan District. Arthur Trimmer arrived with his brother William (born 1795) in April 1831, who was a Lieutenant in the 17th Foot Regiment. All brothers sailed as "gentlemen settlers," paying their own passage and taking all necessities with them. Spencer brought Joshua Kirby Trimmer's merino sheep and cattle with him.

William Trimmer and his cousin Douglas Thompson both drowned in the upper reaches of the Swan River in 1835.

Spencer Trimmer accompanied Bland and Agett in May 1834 on an expedition to confirm that the Swan and Avon Rivers were one and the same. Spencer had a farm at Middle Swan, but unfortunately his entire establishment, dwelling house, out-houses, corn ricks, containing 7.3 cubic metres (210 US bu) of wheat were burnt in a fire. Spencer Trimmer was away at the time. Spencer died in Albany in December 1843.

== York ==
In 1832, Arthur Trimmer and Rivett Henry Bland, who had arrived in the colony with capital, went into partnership to take a grant of several thousand acres of land on the Avon River, York and farm the Trimmer brothers' merino sheep. (Note: The land was what is now Balladong Farm including all land south of South Street, York, except for one block, and to the north, Suburban Lots A1 and A2, the property which now contains Faversham House, Monger's store and the sandalwood yards, which they bought for £20, equivalent to A$2,636 in 2022. They were also given the right to lease for two years the area called the "Government Stock Farm" which was 450 metres (1,480 ft) to the west, at the end of Ford Street.) As between them, Bland was to be entitled to the land to the south of the town site and Trimmer the land to the north.

Bland and Trimmer built a house in York 91 metres (100 yd) above the ford in September 1831. (Note: The house was at least initially one room measuring 3.0 by 2.7 metres (10 by 9 ft). The house was on the south east corner of Avon Terrace and Ford St.) (Note: The house was on York Suburban Lot A1. Prior to making the grant of Lot A2, the Government unusually advertised seven times their intention to do so: Perth Gazette and Western Australian Journal 11 July 1835, p.526; 18 July 1835, p.529; 25 July 1835, p.533; 26 September 1835, p.569; 3 October 1835, p.573; 17 October 1835, p.581; 24 October 1835, p.585. There was also a barn.)

Their flock of sheep was said to be "equal in quality, if not superior, to any of the most approved breed of the sister colonies". Wool sent back to England by Trimmer in 1833 was sold by auction at 2 shillings and 2 pence per pound, equivalent to about A$34 per kilogram in 2022, "although dirty and badly packed". S Henty reported in 1833 that their lambs weighed 15 and 18 kilograms (34 and 39 lb).

In February 1833, Trimmer and Bland's shepherd went out as usual with his flock when he heard the voices of a number of Aboriginal persons in the bush. Uncommonly, a woman came forward and beckoned the others to attack the shepherd. She cried out "warra, warra" ('bad', 'evil') and made threatening gestures. The shepherd fired at her and wounded her, and she staggered back.

In September 1834, the Perth Gazette reported:

The success which has attended Messrs Bland and Trimmer's flock of Sheep at York, has created a general desire to enter upon this lucrative speculation, and many of our Settlers on the Swan, who have the means, as well as some few residents in the towns, are making preparations to remove to their larger grants over the hills, where an unlimited run for the flocks, and a soil adapted for agricultural purposes generally awaits them.

In June 1835, Trimmer was on his way to York when his cart broke down. He was compelled to go on for assistance. On his return, accompanied by Bland, when about 11 kilometres (7 mi) from their home at York, (Note: Around this time, Trimmer joined an expedition led by the Governor to the upper tributary of the Blackwood River, which the Governor named Arthur River after Trimmer.)

they observed [... an Aboriginal person] in the bush in the act of raising his spear, and shortly afterwards, a known signal being given, a party of about twelve rushed forward from the place of their concealment; but both Mr Trimmer and Mr Bland being apprised of their danger by the signal given, put spurs to their horses, and galloped about three miles [4.8 km], by which means they avoided their hostile assailants.

In October 1835, Trimmer and Bland exported two wagon loads of wool in bales.

On 18 April 1836 at Strawberry Hill, Albany, Trimmer married Mary Ann Spencer, one of King George Sound Government Resident Richard Spencer's daughters. Spencer had also brought merino sheep to Western Australia.

By 1836, Trimmer and Bland had 5,000 sheep in York. Bland reported in 1836 that he had increased the flock at the rate of about 80 lambs to 100 ewes per annum. Trimmer and Bland advertised merino sheep for sale at Guildford in September 1836, announcing that the sheep were from the "well known flock of the Earl of Cearnarven".

John Henry Monger Snr built and started operating the York Hotel (and his home) on Bland and Trimmer's property, which he later purchased. (Note: Probably commencing with Bland's house on Lot A1, from mid-1836 onwards.)

In September 1836, three Aboriginal persons gained access to Bland and Trimmer's barn. In Bland's absence, Trimmer was in charge at the time. While carrying away a quantity of flour, they were "wantonly" shot by a shepherd named Ned Gallop who had been lying "perdue" in the straw of the barn on instructions from Trimmer after Trimmer had got tired of waiting and had gone to bed. One died and the other two were badly wounded. Trimmer's "character never could recover from this foul stain". Two days later, in reprisal an old settler called Knott was speared in his hut and robbed. (Note: Probably William Knott.) Following this incident, the partnership between Bland and Trimmer was dissolved. Trimmer and Edward Souper pursued the Aborigine who killed Knott, who "confessed to the murder, but says he was influenced by the constant chants of his mother and other old women, to commit the deed".

Fervent missionary Louis Giustiniani accused "Trimmer and other gentlemen" of organising a "hunting party" to shoot as many Aborigines as possible. Giustiniani also claimed Souper shot and killed an Aboriginal woman and wounded an Aboriginal man. The woman's ears were cut off and Trimmer hung them in his kitchen as a trophy, his house being next to Bland who was the Government Resident. "Mr Trimmer who permits such barbarous acts in his house, is invited to the Governor's table".

The Trimmers' first child Ellen Spencer was born at York on 15 June 1837. Trimmer remained farming and living in the house up from Monger's hotel at least until October 1837 when he was the subject of comment by Bunbury in one of his letters: (Note: He was successful in the tender for fresh meat to the Commissariat office in Perth.)

Thus lately, Mr A Trimmer, who is fast drinking up what little property he has remaining, having had the charge of Mr Yule's sheep, could not, when the flock was counted, account for the absence of eight wethers; these he must pay the value of, as well as of a Ram which was killed at a farm whither it had been sent by him without authority.

Monger bought York Suburban Lots A1 and A2 for £100 in April 1838, but the Trimmer family continued to reside in their house.

== Albany ==
In July 1839, Trimmer's father in law, Richard Spencer, died at Albany. Trimmer moved to Albany and in November 1939, was living at Ongerup near Albany, on a property of his deceased father in law. A large tree collapsed on the house of his late father in law killing Mr W McKath and Mr Horatio William Spencer (aged 15), and it was Trimmer's task to extricate their bodies. Trimmer took up land at Pootenup, near Cranbrook, and in 1856 became a Justice of the Peace and Sub-Protector of Aborigines for the Albany district. He was a member of the Board of Education. Trimmer died in 1877.

== Sources ==
- Bunbury, Henry William St Pierre; Morrell, William Parker, eds. (1930), Early days in Western Australia: Being the letters and journal of Lieut. H.W. Bunbury, 21st fusiliers (PDF), London: Oxford University Press, OCLC 221171847, Wikidata Q136431240
- Deacon, John E. (1948). A Survey of the Historical Development of the Avon Valley with Particular Reference to York, Western Australia During the Years 1830–1850 (Thesis). Claremont Teachers College. Wikidata Q136431176.
- Erickson, Rica, ed. (1979), Dictionary of Western Australians, Nedlands: UWA Publishing, OCLC 757766995, Wikidata Q5273978
