= York Uniting Church =

Church in York, Western Australia

Uniting Church, York
- York Uniting Church
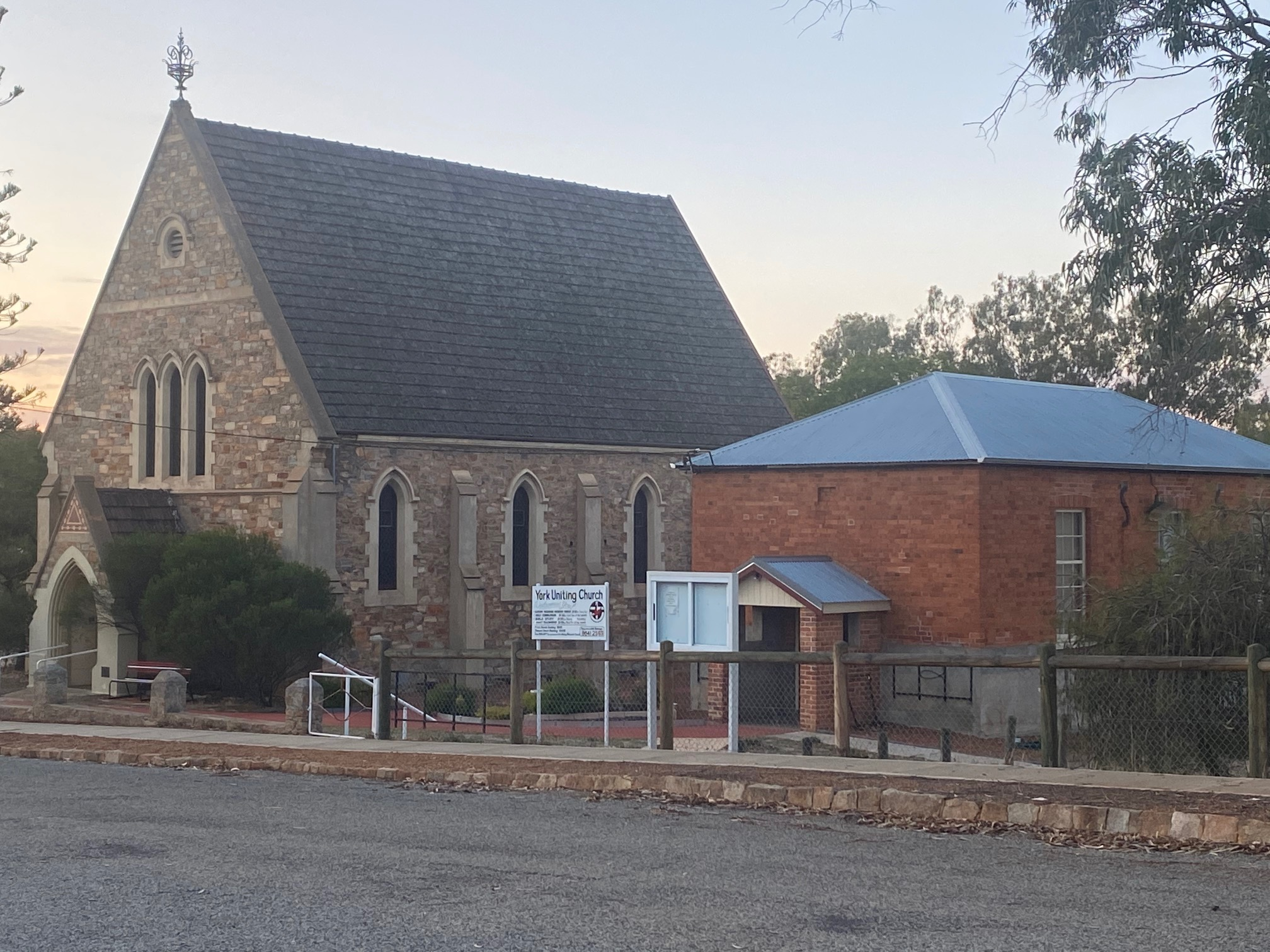
- Uniting Church and chapel
- Address: Grey Street, York, Western Australia
- Country: Australia
- Denomination: Uniting (since 1977)
- Previous denomination: Methodist (1888 – 1977)

History
- Former name: Wesleyan Church
- Status: Church
- Founded: 25 April 1888
- Founder: Mrs J H Monger
- Dedicated: 22 August 1888 by Rev. Thomas Bird

Architecture
- Architect: Alfred McBain Bonython
- Architectural type: Church
- Style: Gothic Revival

The Uniting Church, York is a Uniting church located in Grey Street, York, Western Australia. The church building was established by the Methodist Church in 1888 as the Wesleyan Church, and together with the former chapel, the buildings are significant early buildings of the York settlement.

== Chapel ==
The first pastor in York was Rev John Smithies, who also established the Gerald Mission. While he was in York, tenders were called for construction of the "Wesleyan chapel" on 29 March 1853. Tenders were administered by John Henry Monger Snr, publican and storekeeper, who lived in Faversham House next door to the north, a former engineer who must have been the building's designer.

Monger's call for tenders stated:

Tenders for Building the Wesleyan Chapel in York

TENDERS will be received by Mr J H Monger, York, on the 18th April, at 10 o’clock in the forenoon, either separately or jointly, from any person or persons who may be willing to perform the undermentioned work, viz: - To have a good sound stone foundation 18 inches thick, level from the highest part of the ground, the remainder of the wall to be brick, 9 inch work, 40 feet long, 22 feet wide, 10 feet high, good arches over the windows and doors, also the windows and doors and frames for both the sashes to be hung with weights and pullies, the doors to be panelled. Also the Roof, to be boarded and shingled with three pair of principals and ring posts and one purline. All materials to be found on the ground. For the Roofing, the price to be stated in words and figures, per square, doors and windows ditto, per foot, the brickwork ditto, per yard.

York, March 29, 1853.

Local residents subscribed £200 to fund the construction and the government also assisted.

Monger himself was the successful tenderer. Good progress on the chapel was reported in August 1853. Funding for roofing was being solicited in November 1853. George Wansbrough and his brother John (who were Wesleyans) worked on the roof. (Note: George Wansbrough returned from his apprenticeship in Perth to assist his brother in cutting the roof of the Wesleyan chapel.) One local complained that ticket-of-leave men were not available to be employed in construction of the chapel. (Note: The complaint also related to the Castle Hotel for which ticket-of-leave convicts were eventually used, so it is possible the same happened with the Wesleyan Chapel.)

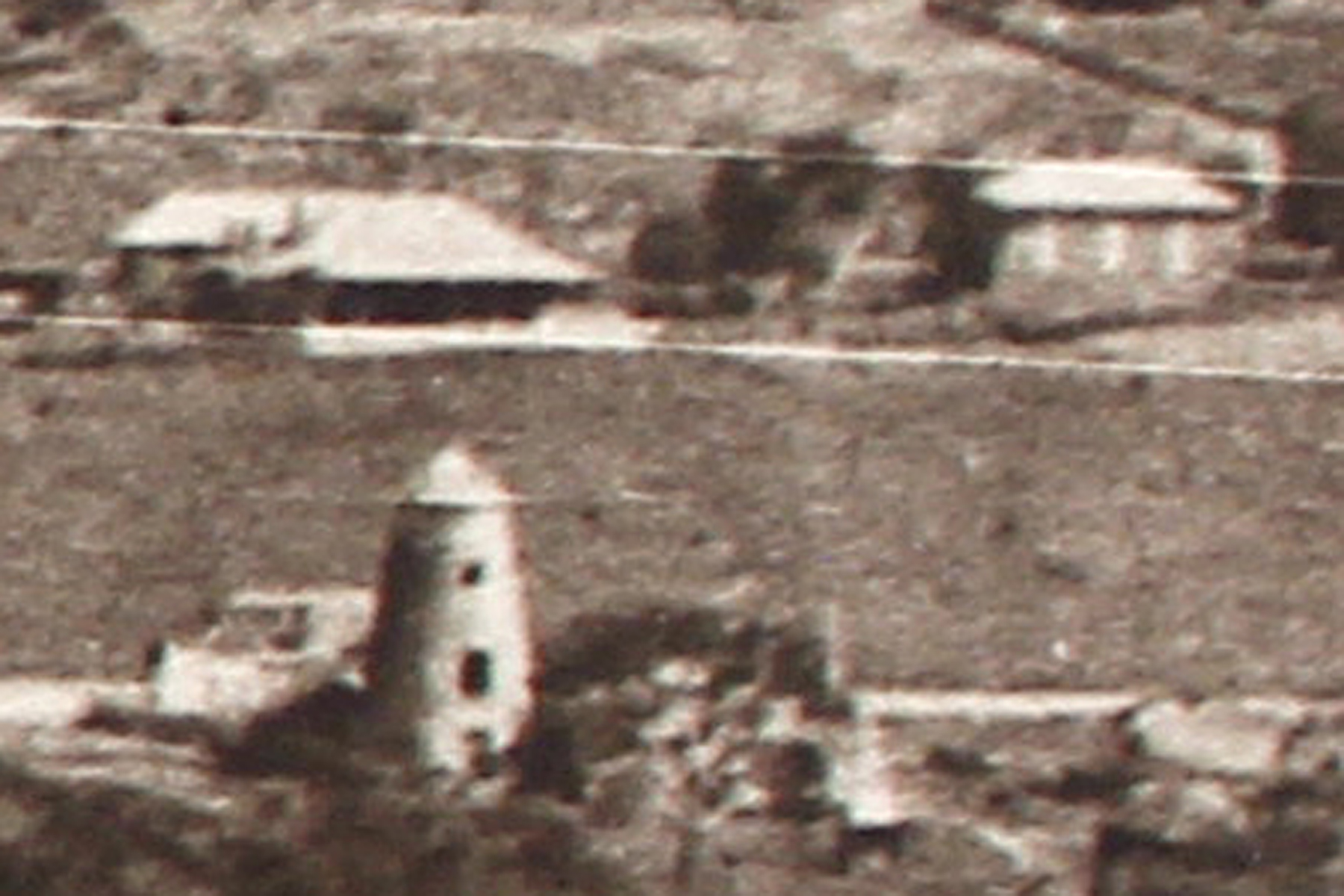
The Wesleyan chapel and manse, with Solomon Cook's mill, 1877.

The chapel was opened on 5 April 1854 by the Rev. William Lowe to a crowd of more than 120 people. The cost of the chapel was £317/12/4. This chapel was the second church in York.

Originally there was a gallery in the chapel but this was later removed. (Note: The gallery was still there in 1888.)

A harmonium was purchased for the chapel in 1859.

Attendees paid pew rents, 5 shillings for a whole seat and 1 shilling for an individual. The cost of upkeep of the chapel was recorded in 1868 as being £15/19/-, of which candles for illumination constituted a large proportion. The chapel keeper (warden) was paid 1 shilling per week for his services.

Monger's design is harmonic, simple and symmetrical, being Victorian Georgian style (not including the later portico).

== Church ==
After Reverend Thomas Bird arrived in August 1878, he saw that the chapel was too small and started plans for a new church and to use the old one for the Sunday School, and social and business meetings. In 1885, the trustees and the Rev William Lowe held a meeting to discuss plans for building the church. The "Wesleyan body generally responded to the demand upon their resources" and by March 1888 most of the money had reportedly been raised.

Tenders were called and the successful tender was from Pringle and Moscrip of Perth and Adelaide for £945. The foundation stone was laid by Mrs J H Monger on 25 April 1888. The foundation stone "is a most beautiful specimen of Sydney free stone, and will be carved during the coming week by Mr Pringle, one of the contractors, by whom it is presented".

"Every preparation was made by the obliging contractor for the ceremony on Wednesday. The scaffolding was adorned with bunting hours before the company assembled. Stones were removed and planks placed for the comfort of those taking part in the service." A "hermetically sealed" bottle containing a list of parishioners and some silver and copper coins common in the colony, was placed under the foundation stone by Joseph Pyke, and Mr Pringle presented Mrs Monger with a silver trowel. On the evening of the laying of the foundation stone, there was a promenade concert in the Oddfellows’ Hall. "The best musical talent that the district affords has been secured" and "with one or two exceptions" this concert was declared a success and raised £17 for the building fund.

The cost of the church was reputed to be £1,000 and in May 1888 there were concerns that only £400 had been raised. In fact, only £236 had been raised, all of the donors to that time being listed in an advertisement the following month, the largest of them being John Henry Monger (£59) who was paying in instalments. Donations continued to be published and the total crept to £345. (Note: In 1889, seat rents brought in sufficient to increase the building fund donations to £500: Eastern Districts Chronicle, 13 April 1889, p.4. In 1892, the Trustees of the church land allowed a street to be cut through block D in front of the church for a price of £500.)

Stone for the church was donated and carted to the site by adherents.

By June, it was reported that construction of the church was fast reaching completion and would be finished by the first Sunday in August 1888.

== Opening of the Church ==
The last two services for the chapel were held by the Rev Thomas Bird and the Rev William Lowe on 19 August. The Rev Thomas Bird held the opening service in the new Church on Wednesday 22 August 1888 at 3:45 pm.

The local newspaper, the Eastern Districts Chronicle reported:

The Church is a valuable addition to the many imposing edifices erected here, and the internal arrangements are finished in a workmanlike manner, redounding greatly to the credit of Messrs. Pringle and Moscrip, as contractors. Its acoustic properties are of the highest order as was plainly evidenced at the services on Wednesday last. A great many people attended from Perth. Northern, Newcastle, Beverley, and other towns, and the whole congregation numbered quite 300 souls.

== Architecture ==
The architect of the church was Alfred McBain Bonython who had come from Adelaide and Melbourne and was living in Perth designing buildings for the Shenton family. He was only 23 at the time. He also designed the Wesleyan Methodist churches in Fremantle and Albany.

The church is in Victorian Academic Gothic Revival style; and its features include a steeply pitched roof, parapeted gable, excellent stone masonry, wall buttresses, lancet windows, a porch with Gothic arch (a later addition) and label moulds.

== Organ ==
A fund was raised by Mrs Florence Monger in 1895 for the purchase of an organ constructed by Alfred Monk of London. The organ is only one of two Alfred Monk organs in Australia and is considered the best 19th century organ in Western Australia "in both the warmth of its tone and brilliance of sound and in capability to fill the sanctuary with sound".

Originally, the organ had to be hand-pumped. An organ pumper recollected:

The organ pumper was very important. If the musician and the person pumping the organ were on good terms, the pumper would use long even strokes of the pump lever to provide a nice even flow of music and when the musician was using FF which means full volume one would have to watch the level indicator and increase the speed of stroke but still keep it very even to compensate for the volume of air being used to produce the volume of sound.

The names of a number of the organ pumpers are scratched in the back of the organ case.

In 1925, an electric blower was installed.

The organ was restored in 1981-2 by F. J. Larner & Co and was cleaned and maintained in June 2001.

The gallery in the church was originally intended to be used by the choir but the installation of the pipe organ meant that the choir assembled at the front of the church.

== Bell ==
The bell of the church was cast at the London foundry of John Warner & Sons in 1905. The bell is 510 millimetres (20 in) in diameter and weighs approximately 91 kilograms (201 lb). The bell was donated by Mr E. R. Parker. Originally the bell was mounted on a wooden tower at the back of the chapel. When that became unsafe it was replaced by a metal tower. In November 2010, the bell was erected in the present tower which was paid for by public subscription.
