= Peter Barrow =

Peter Barrow (30 July 1813 – 6 October 1899) was a son of Sir John Barrow, 1st Baronet, and an early settler in the colony of Western Australia, becoming a magistrate and Guardian of Aborigines, Anglican priest and school teacher in York, Western Australia. He left the colony after two years and became a British consul.

== In Western Australia ==
Barrow was sent from England to be a Protector of Aborigines. He arrived in Western Australia on 2 January 1840 on Westmoreland, and was very quickly appointed as a magistrate and as a Guardian of Aborigines in York.

== York ==
Barrow was fortunate to secure the close friendship of the resident magistrate, Rivett Henry Bland, and bought a 4-hectare (10-acre) property from him for 10 pounds, (Note: The property was on part of Avon Locations U and V. From the property description on the conveyance, the northern section of this rectangular property appears to include the site of St John's Church and the property extended south easterly towards Blands Brook: confirmed by surveyor John Bullock of York in 2020.) on which he built a "small house".

Barrow was involved in the formation of the York Agricultural Society on 3 August 1840, becoming its first secretary and treasurer. However, Barrow came under the displeasure of certain of the members so that he was forced to resign before the first show was held. (Note: The reason for this is that he had arranged for a dinner to be held at John Henry Monger Snr's York Hotel, which many in the society did not wish to patronise. This may have resulted in Monger refusing to hold the dinner "according to promise")

He arranged the construction of a Church (St John’s) (Note: The church was not quite finished in October 1840) which could accommodate 100 people, and Barrow read church services; on one occasion he is reported to have delivered a "capital sermon".

== Guardian of Aborigines ==
As Guardian of Aborigines, Barrow at first found his duties difficult; he reported in June 1840:

How little good I have been enabled to accomplish [largely because he felt] left to act on my own responsibility, without the advantage of either a legal advisor, nor an Interpreter.

Nine months later, on 31 March 1841, Barrow reported :

On arriving in the District allotted to me by the Local Government, my first step was to endeavour, by a distribution of flour, to assemble the natives together, and introduce myself. Accordingly on the appointed day the neighbouring tribes of York collected in the town-site, and then I explained, as clearly as I could through the medium of interpreters, the benevolent object which the Government had in view in sending me among them; and, although at the time, I feared it would be difficult to make them understand the nature of my appointment, I am happy to be enabled to state that 12 months experience among has convinced me that they did thoroughly comprehend what was then explained to them. On no occasion have they received an injury from a white man, as far as I can ascertain, without immediately applying to me for protection, and the punishment of the offenders, and there have even been several instances of their complaining to me against their fellow-blacks. Among others I may name the following – Shortly after my arrival in York, natives named Woollam and Malagur complained to me that their women had been stolen by two other natives named Ginmarra and Pingie. I went out after, and found them, about 14 miles from York at Yaryeddin, when I promised flour to all of them if the women were restored; and threatened them with punishment if they were still withheld. In a short space of time, the women were returned, and it is now a matter of frequent occurrence for natives to come to me and complain that their women have been stolen.

To quote McLaren and Cooper:

Barrow also noted that the majority of settlers, now aware of their numerical superiority and the value of Aborigines as workers, attempted to treat them humanely, for already a growing number were incorporated within the workforce, often with highly satisfactory results. Despite the risk of being attacked by their fellow Ballardong, a substantial number of Aboriginal people gained employment as cattle-herders and shepherds on pastoral holdings, where there were frequent reports of their reliability and dedication. One such employee commenced his service by bringing into Addington a valuable cow which he had discovered wandering in the bush.

Barrow published an advertisement about the cow: "A report having gone abroad that a cow had been speared, killed and eaten by natives in the neighbourhood of Addington, I beg leave, through the public press, to contradict the report, inasmuch as the same cow is now alive and well at Addington Farm. I am informed however that suspicions are entertained that a spear was thrown at it." A year before Barrow's arrival at York, two Aboriginal people had been hanged near York at the site of where they had murdered Sarah Cook and her baby daughter. In 1841, their bodies were still hanging at the site and Barrow commented: "The execution of the two natives, Barrabong and Doojeep, for the murder of Mrs Cook, appears to have had the most beneficial effect: their bodies are still hanging in chains, a terror to evil doers."

In Barrow's June 1841 report as Protector of Aborigines, he reported that in the northern and southern extremes of his territory, the Aboriginal tribes were not so peaceably disposed as those who are more directly in the heart of the settlement. He also refers to having "native constables". He visited Albany during the year in his capacity as Protector of Aborigines.

== School ==
Barrow offered to teach gratuitously any children that were sent to him, but he only had two students, the families in the York district being so spread out, with most children being taught by their parents or a tutor. He also gave instruction to Aboriginal children and taught four of them the alphabet, including Cowits.

In April 1841, the "indefatigable" Barrow devised an ambitious plan to use his five room home as an international school, named Wallingford Classical and Mathematical Academy, teaching "the classics, mathematics, geography, polite literature and the rudiments of the Eastern languages". He published an advertisement aimed at "educating the rising generations of Western Australians" and also courting the hope of inducing families resident in India to send their children there, instead of to England. Fees were £100 a year. In the advertisement, he named as instructors John Burdett Wittenoom, Reverend Mears, Henry Maxwell Lefroy and himself, and Viveash as medical officer. In another newspaper of the same date, Barrow published an advertisement saying "in consequence of unforeseen obstacles, Wallingford Academy will not be opened until further notice." Barrow then advertised his house to let for three to seven years.

On 3 September 1841, Barrow gave notice that he intended to leave the colony, and he sold his home to Bland for 200 pounds. (Note: Bland sold the house with 4 acres to Rivers Grindall who in 1849 sold the property to Joseph Kenworthy, the property being later cut in half by Elizabeth Street: Conservation Plan for Balladong Farm, p.22.) He left the colony on 7 October, bound for Singapore. (Note: Barrow sold his German silver to John Henry Monger Snr.)

== Later life ==
Barrow became British vice-consul of Caen, then of Rabat and Sallee in Morocco, then in 1862 of Nantes, then from 1866 to 1879 of Kerch. He died childless in Ouistreham, France on 6 October 1899.
