= John Henry Monger Snr =

Western Australian settler

John Henry Monger Snr (1802–1867) was an assisted migrant who became one of the richest men in Western Australia. In 1829, Monger emigrated to the Swan River Colony, in what is today Western Australia; he went on to run a mill at Galup and establish a hotel and store in York.

== Early years in England ==
Monger was born on 2 February 1802 in Faversham, Kent, England. By trade he was an engineer.

== First years in Western Australia ==
He arrived on 6 October 1829 on board Lotus with his wife Mary. He was an assisted immigrant, indentured to Colonel Peter Latour, who planned an ambitious emigration scheme on 40,000 hectares (100,000 acres) of land in the Leschenault area near Bunbury. Monger was to be foreman of Latour's sawmills.

Monger constructed and ran a sawmill at Galup, just north of the Perth settlement, which later came to bear his name, Lake Monger, until 2025. He invested in an allotment at Galup ("the Lake") of 81 hectares (200 acres) of "sand" with five trees per 4,000 square metres (1 acre). He and his family at first had a camp there but then built a house.

A Mr Halliday "met his death by violence" near the lake and Monger and at first Aboriginal people and then a sawyer called John Ellis (a "timid man") were suspected of the shooting. Monger (who was accustomed to conversing with Aboriginal people – "he understood a few of their words, and the rest were made intelligible to him by signs") gave evidence.

Monger left Galup in March 1833, after Yagan, Yellagonga and other Noongar warriors chose Galup as a place to congregate, and the Aboriginal people were reported to

have become so troublesome to Mr Monger, his wife and young children that he has this morning applied for a sufficient military force to repel them. Their numbers in the neighbourhood of the Lake have greatly increased, by accession from other vicious tribes, all larger and more powerful men than those we have been accustomed to see. Mr Monger informed us, he can only recognise three of the party, out of about forty men, as those who have been in the habit of resorting to that quarter. They have now he says taken such full possession of his place that unless they are repulsed, he must abandon it.

Monger is reported to have carried 4.5 litres (1.2 US gal) of brandy around the colony for sale and he sold it for a price that enabled him next time to buy double the amount of brandy. In November 1833, Monger took possession of the Perth Hotel (the "old established hotel" offering "dinners, beds and stabling") and he published an advertisement soliciting the support of the public.

Monger also took up a grant of land (Perth Lot L55) on Mount Eliza, on which he built a house with four rooms. Monger put the Galup property up for lease or sale in September 1834 and again in April and October 1836, also putting two Mount Eliza lots up for sale including his pit and cross-cut saws, with the statement "proprietor moving to York".

On 21 May 1836, Monger's banker, William Lamb, put up for auction his house at Mount Eliza plus 81 hectares (200 acres) "of land situated on one of the Lakes at the back of Perth".

In May 1836, Monger wrote a letter to the paper criticising his banker for calling up a mortgage of £25, equivalent to A$3,362 in 2022. The rate of interest was 25% per annum; Monger complained that he had been paying the interest monthly. He claimed he was at risk of losing his house and land at "the Lakes" except for the kindness of a few friends. The banker responded that he had warned Monger that the principal sum would be required when it was due but instead of repaying the loan, Monger went to York for three weeks.

== York ==
Monger initially walked to York. While everyone else was wanting a grant of farmland for sheep grazing, Monger saw an opportunity to open a hotel and store. Monger decided that the best location for a hotel and store was close to the ford across the Avon River at York.

The land he chose (Suburban Lots A1 and A2) had been claimed by Rivett Henry Bland and Arthur Trimmer. Bland and Trimmer built the first house in York here, 91 metres (100 yd) above the ford, in September 1831. Trimmer also had a house next to Bland's and there was also a barn. Monger bought this land for £100. (Note: The land included the homes of Bland and Trimmer, see the next note below) At the time, Bland was the Government resident magistrate for York and Beverley.

== Monger’s store and the York Hotel ==
Monger applied for a free licence in early 1837 and then an ordinary licence. He was described as being "a publican, of York" on 5 February 1837, when he had to personally eject a troublesome private in the 21st Regiment named John Curran, who was later charged with assault for hitting Monger with a bludgeon. (Note: Trimmer was mentioned in the court case as still living in his house at the time. Bland's house had been next door to Trimmer's.) The original hotel was a small building of wattle and daub and was the first hotel in the area. This was called the York Hotel. The wattle and daub hotel burnt down and Monger then built a large and substantial hostelry.

It was a dangerous time; in July 1838, Monger returned to Perth to report spearings by "hostile tribes". On 20 May 1839, the wife of Elijah Cook was murdered by Aboriginal people not far to the south of York, which caused shock waves throughout the Colony.

In December 1838, Monger ("innkeeper of York") was charged with assaulting James Manson on a street in Perth, but the case was "compromised by paying the constable’s expenses equally". In 1838, Monger's licence fee was doubled from £5 to £10. He asked for the additional fee to be suspended, complaining that in a distant place like York, the remuneration from accommodation is limited and precarious, and that his crops had failed and he had lost some good friends to his business.

In May 1840, the government expressed a desire to extend Avon Terrace through Monger's land. Monger sought compensation and after much haggling, was granted Town Lot 1 as a replacement.

A few months after this, he opened Monger's Store, commonly referred to as "Monger's". (Note: According to Stowe (1905), the commencement date was 1842. However, Monger’s first advertisements started appearing in 1841.) It was the first general store established in York. Stocks such as hardware, drapery, groceries, wines and spirits, provisions and implements were sold there. Monger advertised his goods heavily from 4 August 1841 onwards, as being available "at the stores of the undersigned".

Monger became unpopular because in October 1840 he declined to provide a dinner "according to promise" for the first Fair of the York Agricultural Society. Settler Dr Samuel Viveash commented in his diary entry of 22 December 1840: "Called on Monger, he was not inclined to settle my bill, indeed tried to snatch it out of my hand." (Note: Also refer to the diary entry of 15 January 1841.)

Monger's "store" was on the opposite side of Avon Terrace, and was a "long, low building", and "every three months his wagons would journey to Guildford or Perth for supplies". The stone section on the south east corner of what is now called the sandalwood yards could have been this "long low building".

In 1841, Monger built a windmill. The windmill was located on 0.81 hectares (2 acres) on the northeast corner, where the current sandalwood yards are located.

Monger also built a blacksmith's shop on Town Lot 1 (Note: This building still exists.) and engaged a blacksmith, but at the time he did not have a grant of the land and so he had to seek the Governor's permission to occupy his own building. He also applied for permission to occupy an island to the north of the ford as a summer hotel but the Governor refused this request.

In November 1842, he advertised for "a steady, industrious man to take charge of and drive a team of bullocks, and otherwise make himself generally useful". Monger's mill appears not to have worked consistently as in a number of 1843 advertisements, Monger offered for sale "an excellent flour mill, now in good operation". One advantage of having a mill was that Monger could accept wheat after harvest instead of cash in payment for goods sold. At the time, "money is not to be had in the Colony, all is barter".

In May 1844, Monger gave technical assistance to Walkinshaw Cowan in his steam mill venture in Guildford, and was also an investor. In his diary, Cowan blamed the failure of the venture on "the misconduct and ignorance of an Engineer".

In November 1844, Monger advertised his hotel ("the York Hotel") to be let for "one year to seven, as may be agreed on". The advertisement sets out a full description of the property.

Monger was trying to find a buyer for the business "so that he could concentrate on his merchandising business [...] this included expanding his interests and also establishing himself as a collecting agent for Western Australia's burgeoning sandalwood industry".

It appears that Monger did not find a tenant for the hotel because he continued to trade the hotel and advertise. Monger also continued offering goods for sale at his "stores".

== Sandalwood ==
Around this time, sandalwood was starting to be exported from the York region by "Messrs Carter and T Ellis". Licensing for the cutting of sandalwood had been in force since 1841. Ellis was a tenant of Monger, living in a small house on Town Lot 1. The sandalwood was exported to Singapore and China.

York farmers brought their sandalwood to Monger's and, in exchange, would receive goods and articles from the store. In addition to dealing in sandalwood, Monger was heavily involved in buying, selling, storing and carting wool. He recognised the value of fencing as this eliminated the need for shepherds, and he imported large quantities of fencing wire.

In 1847, Monger obtained his first sandalwood licences, enabling him to have two teams of two men to gather sandalwood for three months, and Monger became one of the exporters. In that year, 1847, the amount of sandalwood exported from Western Australia multiplied tenfold to 380 tonnes (830,000 lb) earning £4,440, equivalent to A$542,332 in 2022, almost as much as the wool exports from the colony. In the following year, 1848, sandalwood exports tripled again and brought in £13,353 (equivalent to A$1,871,410 in 2022) and wool exports were £15,098 (equivalent to A$2,115,975 in 2022), a fair proportion of which would have been by Monger.

Eliza Brown refers to Monger (Note: She incorrectly calls him "Henry Taylor" Monger.) in one of her letters to her father, William Bussey, in England:

His word is law, like the law of the Medes and Persians it altereth not. Moreover he is of a very bountiful and kindly nature.

== Faversham House ==
Monger built a new home called Faversham House after the place in Kent where John Henry Monger Snr had been born. There is a reference to Monger's "hospitable mansion" in January 1852.

In 1853, Monger was the designer of the Wesleyan Chapel, immediately to the south of Faversham House, and builder. His specifications show his attention to detail.

== Later life ==
Monger allowed Samuel Smale Craig to run the York Hotel and on 8 May 1852, Craig was granted a liquor licence for the hotel under the name Agricultural and Commercial Hotel. (Note: This is presumed to be Monger's.) Then in August 1853, Monger advertised that the York Hotel was available for lease. Monger had sold land to Craig on the corner of Avon Terrace and South Street on which Craig was to construct the Castle Hotel.

In August 1853, Monger permitted R A Bennett to re-commence trading at the York Hotel. To help Bennett set up the hotel, Monger found some things in his cellar (this must have been the cellar at Faversham House) and gave them to Bennett. According to Bennett, these objects included two bullock's horns. A year later, Monger claimed that Bennett had stolen the two bullock's horns, and a number of other objects including three boards, screws and nails, a button, a pick and some tobacco. Monger pressed criminal charges against Bennett. Bennett successfully defended these charges and then sued Monger for £2,000, equivalent to A$182,515 in 2022, damages for malicious and vexatious prosecution for felony. Bennett was successful and recovered £40, equivalent to A$3,650 in 2022, damages (being the costs he had spent defending the criminal charges). Monger appealed and lost.

Monger's son, Joseph T Monger took over the running of the York Hotel.

In May 1853, John Henry Monger Snr paid for and built a "temporary" bridge at Monger's Crossing or Monger's Ford.

The following year, Monger attempted to subdivide and put up for sale sixteen 2,000-square-metre (0.5-acre) allotments, nine on the river front and another seven on the other side running towards Faversham, presumably not including his store. He offered these lots for auction on 15 October 1854. The ads describe the property fully. Not a single lot was sold.

On 1 November 1854, "the gentry and public generally of York and surrounding districts" were invited to the re-opening of the "York Hotel" by G. J. Blackiston who has "refurnished and stocked it with a choice selection of wines, spirits, bottled and draft ales, etc". In 1855, Monger added a steam engine to his mill.

On 10 October 1856, Monger advertised that he was going to England on a temporary visit and all parties who owed him money should pay their bills or the matter would be put in the hands of his solicitors.

In April 1857, Monger "enlivened the dullness of York by erecting a bell at his house, upon which is struck with considerable regularity, the hours, day and night".

In June 1857, Joseph T Monger took over his father's businesses in York and advertised "that he has on sale at his Wholesale and Retail Stores in York, an extensive and varied Stock of the undermentioned articles". He also announced that wheat will be ground and dressed at Monger's new steam mill in York.

In March 1858, Monger and his daughter went on a trip to England. He returned on Dolphin in 1859. An 1849 map of York by P. L. S. Chauncy shows the extent of Monger's holdings in the immediate vicinity of York. Monger owned 31.8 hectares (78.5 acres) south of the main settlement and also owned land to the north, which included Avon Locations A1 and A2.

In 1853, Monger held 12,000 hectares (30,000 acres) of farmland in the York district.

Monger took advantage of the availability of ticket-of-leave men and employed 63 of them between 1852 and 1871.

Towards the end of his life, York people called Monger the "Duke" (of York).

Monger had a reputation for financially supporting many pastoralists. He gave financial assistance to William Marwick when he was in financial difficulties. (Note: The person giving assistance was identified by Marwick as the father of JT Monger in a letter to the Eastern Districts Chronicle on 24 August 1917 on page 3.)

In 1858, Monger's wealth was so well known that he issued "One Pound Notes".

Monger gave land for a town hall at York in 1861. He owned a grand home towards the top of St Georges Terrace in Perth.

== Death ==
John Henry Monger died on 12 November 1867. No obituary was published for him.

At the time, he held 36,000 hectares (90,000 acres) of land, and this was one of the "first great estates to be broken up".

In his will, he left Faversham and the other property to the west of Avon Terrace (except the mill) to John Henry Monger Jnr, the property to the east of Avon Terrace (and the mill and store) to Joseph Taylor Monger, his St George's Terrace property to his daughter and what is now 156 Avon Terrace, York and some farm land to George.

== Legacy ==
In an 1889 interview with early settler and farmer John Taylor, who came to the York district in 1841 where the only storekeeper was Monger, Taylor said:

The extortion of the store keepers is bad enough now, but it was terrible in those days. We had to give our wheat away for next to nothing and the greatest grievance of the squatters and farmers was at that time, and ought still to be, the extortion of the store men. I have lived here when I never knew what it was to have the taste of liquor or the possibility of getting it for a whole year at a time, when a pair of moleskin trousers cost me a sovereign, the price now being seven and sixpence, and at a time when I never had fresh meat, our only food being salt beef and pork from America which were charged at a feaful rate. Those were the days when the bushmen were swindled by the storekeepers. I have had to wade over fords and then often to swim with a sack of wheat in order to get stores in ‘barter’.

Janet Millett, who lived in York in the 1860s, commented on page 393 of An Australian Parsonage:

Most of the successful storekeepers have been men who were brought up in the colony, and who know the position and prospects of almost everyone in it. So very large a portion of the business carried on is done upon credit that it is necessary to leave a large margin for bad debts, and to be careful as to the customers on the books. All this takes time and observation to learn, and renders it requisite for a new-comer to be cautious and distrustful of his own judgement at first starting. Then, again, many of the settlers have so long been accustomed to look upon some one or other of the store-keepers as their factor and banker combined, sending him all their wool and produce of every description and drawing money from him when they require any advances, that they are completely in his power, and dare not go to any newly-established store for fear of his anger; thus much of the trade would be out of the new-comer's reach, however low might be his prices for stores supplied, however high the offers he might make for the purchase of colonial produce.

== Extended family ==
Monger's younger brother Stephen John Monger, born on 21 June 1806 in Faversham, Kent, emigrated to Western Australia in 1844. John Henry Monger Snr applied to purchase a block for him in Northam so he could set himself up with a store and hotel. Stephen and his family ran businesses in Northam and Toodyay.

== Sources ==
- Bunbury, Henry William St Pierre; Morrell, William Parker, eds. (1930). Early days in Western Australia: Being the letters and journal of Lieut. H.W. Bunbury, 21st fusiliers (PDF). London: Oxford University Press. OCLC 221171847. Wikidata Q136431240.
- Clack, Anthony M. (2003). York Sketchbook. Illustrated by Jenni McColl. York, Western Australia: York Society. ISBN 0959650245. OCLC 223680470.
- Deacon, John E. (1948). A Survey of the Historical Development of the Avon Valley with Particular Reference to York, Western Australia During the Years 1830–1850 (Thesis). Claremont Teachers College. Wikidata Q136431176.
- Stowe, W.E. (1905). "Introduction". The Avon Valley: embracing Newcastle, Northam, York, Beverley.
