= Eliza's Cottage =

Building in York, Western Australia

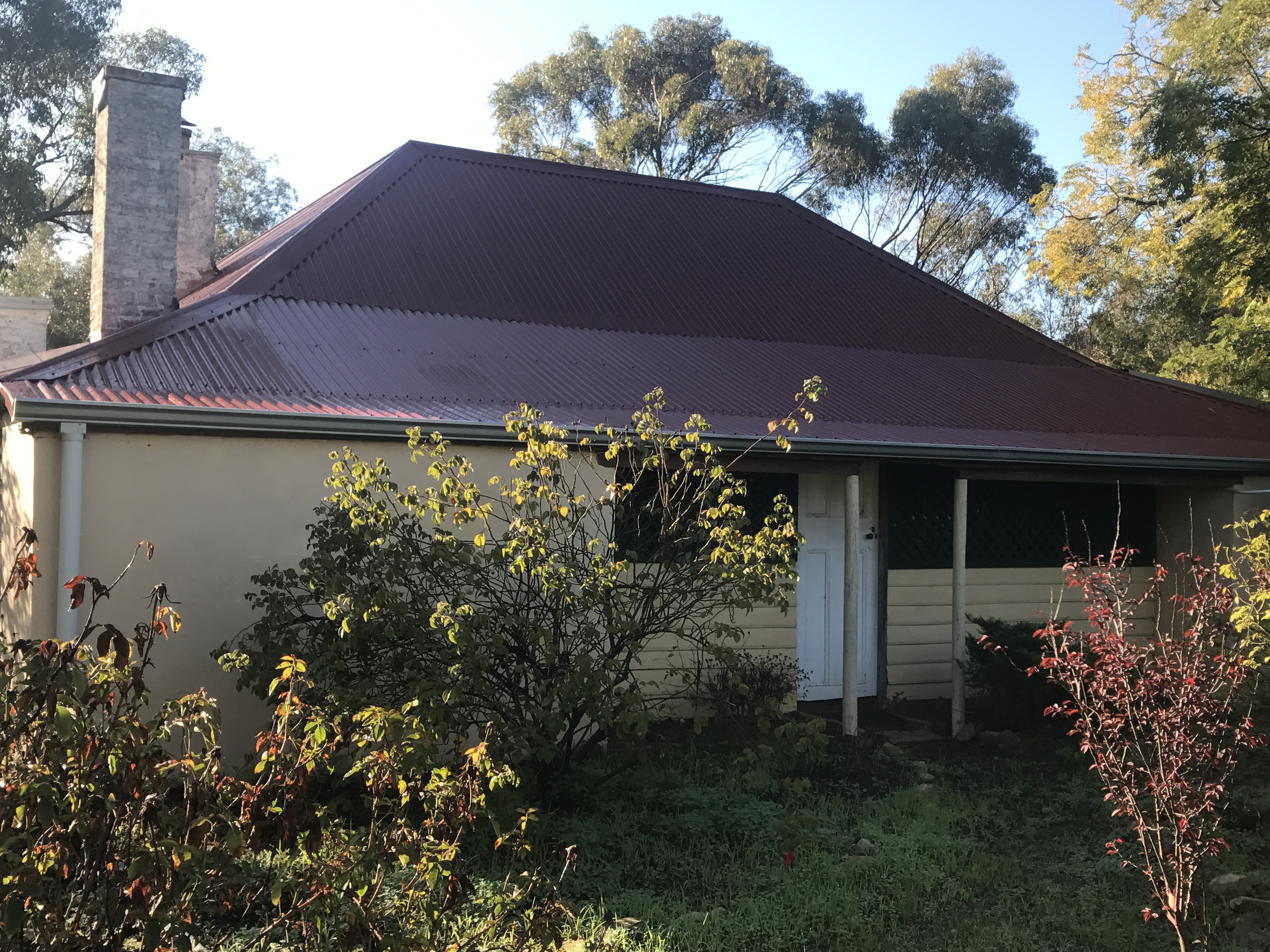
- Eliza's Cottage in 2018
- Interactive map of the Eliza's Cottage area
- Alternative names: Lookout for Trains Cottage, Burtons Cottage.

General information
- Location: 9 Revett Place, York, Western Australia
- Coordinates: 31.89864°S 116.7692°E
- Construction started: c. 1840

Western Australia Heritage Register
- Type: State Registered Place
- Designated: 5 January 2001
- Reference no.: 2868

References
- York municipal inventory

Eliza's Cottage is a historic building in the York area of Western Australia.

It is a rare example of a rammed earth structure totally contained within later extensions, representative of the type of dwelling built in the York area, and elsewhere, during the early settlement years. Eliza's Cottage is a simple, Victorian Georgian style building with a central two room "core" constructed from rammed earth, later extensions constructed from soft fired bricks that surround the original two rooms, and more recent extensions at the rear of the building constructed from hard fired bricks. The exterior of the cottage has been rendered. The single storey structure has a broken pitched, hipped roof covered with corrugated galvanised iron. Three simple brick chimney stacks protrude through the roof on the northern side of the cottage.

The widespread use of rammed earth as a construction method during the 1830s and 1840s probably places Eliza's Cottage somewhere within this time frame. At this stage however, it is impossible to say who built the cottage or for whom it was built. As it was located on Rivett Henry Bland's land it is possible that the cottage was built by Bland to house labourers or possibly an overseer. It is considered that there was definitely a house on the property when Burton purchased it in 1860, as bricks had replaced rammed earth as the preferred material.

The cottage was built in several stages. The first stage is represented by two core rooms and is thought to date to the early 1840s. The first alterations probably occurred in the 1870s when the cottage was considerable enlarged. The next known alterations occurred in 1988 when additions were added to the rear. The name of the original owner or occupant is not known, though the land was owned by Bland and it is likely that he lived here at some point.

In 1855, the land was sold to Stephen Stanley Parker, who also may have lived here for a while before building Bridge House. Parker sold off a portion of Avon Location t (3 roods) to Henry Burton in 1860.

Burton had arrived in Western Australia on 1 June 1850 aboard Scindian. He was an enrolled pensioner guard and was listed as a labourer living in York in the 1859 census.

Burton sold the cottage to Harden York, a victualler at York, in March 1870 for the sum of £35. York soon moved on to Beverley, where he set himself up as a shopkeeper, and he sold the cottage in 1874 to Thomas Tomkinson, a carpenter in York, for £40. Tomkinson was born in 1830 and had arrived in Western Australia c. 1848. He married three times and was widowed twice. At the time of his purchase of Eliza's Cottage he had five children. Tomkinson had owned the cottage for nine years when he sold it in 1883 to George Bird of Albany. He obtained a price of £120. The considerable increase in the resale value of the property suggests that major improvements had been made to the building by Tomkinson prior to the sale. Tomkinson may possibly have made the additions himself, as by 1883 he was described as a builder. Bird sold the property in 1886 to Richard Chipper, a publican at York. It is highly likely that both Bird and Chipper had purchased with a view to its investment value, rather than to occupy it themselves. Chipper died in 1888 and the property spent a while in limbo while his trustees ordered his estate. The cottage was sold by George Stirling (operating on behalf of the trustees) for £120 in 1901 to William Cox, a teamster living in York. To purchase the cottage, Cox borrowed £50 from Mary Neville. Cox defaulted on his payments and the property passed into the possession of Neville, who sold the cottage in 1920 to Janet Clement. The cottage had several owners following on from Clement and it was in 1988, during the occupancy of Michael and Alice Woods, that additions were made to the rear of the cottage. Bruce and Kathleen May became the new owners of Eliza's Cottage in June 1991. They named the dwelling Eliza's Cottage.
