= Marwick's Shed =

Heritage-listed shed in York, Western Australia

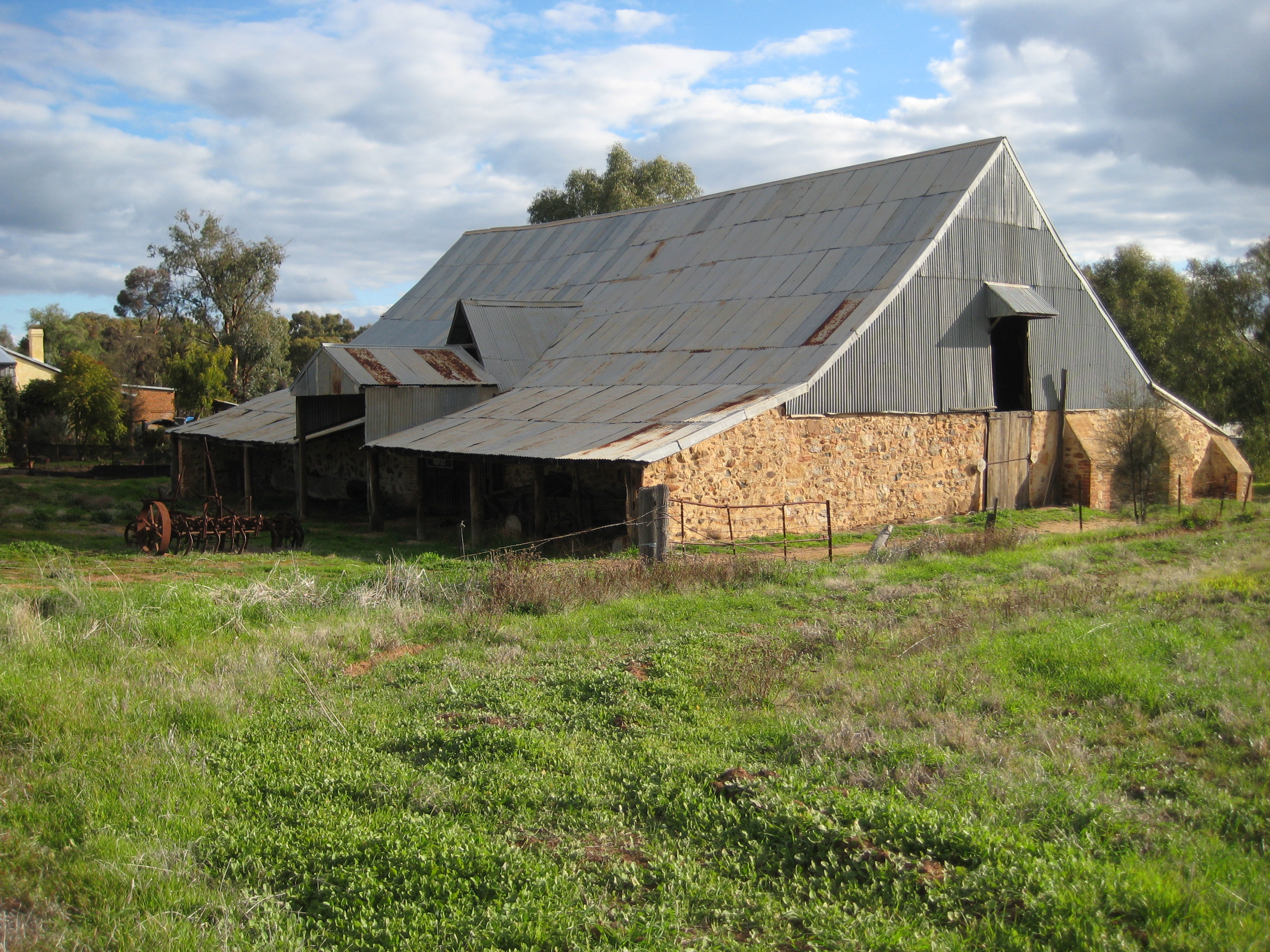
- Marwick's Shed in 2012
- Interactive map of the Marwick's Shed area

General information
- Location: 19-21 Newcastle St, York, Western Australia
- Coordinates: 31°53′02″S 116°46′23″E
- Construction started: c. 1876
- Renovated: 2012

Western Australia Heritage Register
- Type: State Registered Place
- Designated: 23 November 2001
- Reference no.: 2884

Marwick's Shed is a heritage-listed shed in York, Western Australia, constructed in about 1876 to serve as a storage and stabling facility for the significant wheatbelt transport and trading business established by William Marwick, which operated from York.

It is one of the few surviving vernacular structures of similar form and age in Western Australia.

The shed is an important landmark of York and is a favourite subject for photographers and artists. Its "romantic abandoned appearance" makes it a popular spot for taking wedding photographs.

The lean-to extensions were used as stables for the horses and it is possible to see the hollowed out tree trunks which acted as troughs.

== Construction technique ==
The shed is unusual in its construction because of its dominant spreading roof and double gabled entrance. It also uses internal columns as a principal means of support to create a vast internal space free of load bearing walls.

== History ==
The shed was constructed on Lot 130, owned by Samuel Evans Burges of Tipperary farm, the first employer of William Marwick. It was not until 1899 that ownership of the land was formally transferred into the names of Marwick's sons.

Initially, the shed served a number of functions relating to the Marwick family's haulage business, including storage for goods awaiting transportation, the repair and housing of drays and other equipment used by the business, storage of fodder for horses, and stabling of horses.

This business and use of the shed reached its high point during the Yilgarn gold rush, as York was the principal staging post for the goldfields. Prospectors would arrive in the Swan River Colony through the port of Albany, travel by rail to York and then make their way to the goldfields. Businesses providing stores, equipment and transport to the goldfields thrived. York ceased to be the main staging post for the goldfields after the railway was extended from Northam to Coolgardie in the late 1890s.

After that time, the Marwick family was mainly concerned with farming, and the shed became a central base from which work was undertaken on various properties that the family owned. The shed gradually fell into disuse. The shed is now used as a repository of old and redundant machinery, including old items from the family business, as well as discarded household furniture.

== Heritage listings ==
The building is listed on the Shire municipal inventory (31 December 1995), classified by the National Trust of Australia (5 March 1985), and on the Register of the National Estate (20 March 1978).
