= Faversham House =

Building in York, Western Australia

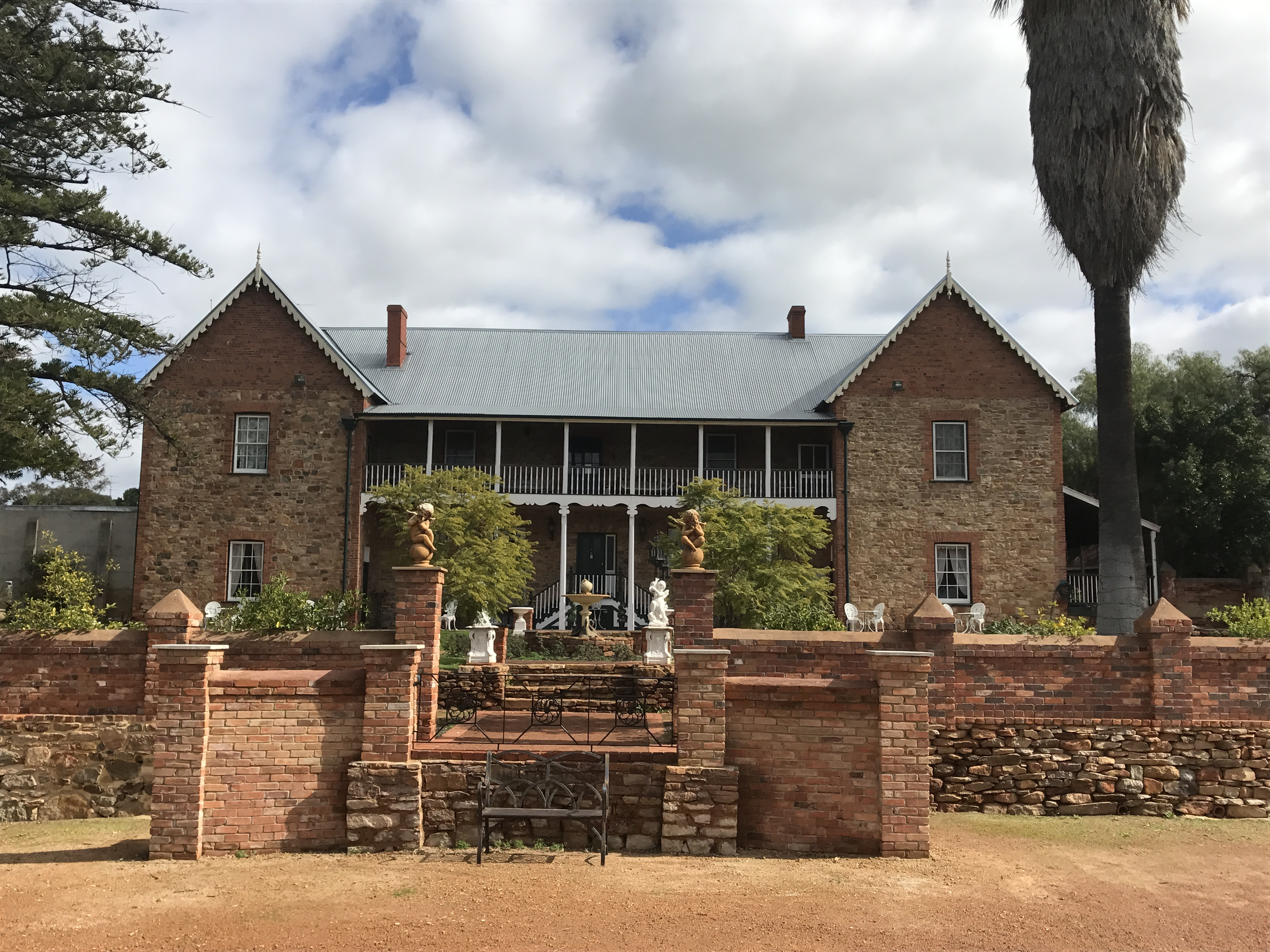
- Faversham House in 2018
- Interactive map of the Faversham House area

General information
- Location: 24 Grey St, York, Western Australia
- Coordinates: 31.8855°S 116.7663°E
- Construction started: some time between late 1830s and 1844
- Completed: 1907
- Renovated: 1994

Western Australia Heritage Register
- Type: State Registered Place
- Designated: 2 September 1997
- Reference no.: 2876

Faversham House is a heritage-listed "grand residence" overlooking Avon Terrace in York, Western Australia. The house, named after the birthplace of John Henry Monger Snr, was built in four stages by the Monger family.

With almost fifty rooms, Faversham House was one of the largest colonial residences in York.

== John Henry Monger Snr ==
John Henry Monger Snr arrived in the Swan River Colony in 1829 as a sponsored immigrant, and after building and operating a sawmill near Perth at what was later called Lake Monger, he moved to York and in 1836, and started the first hotel in York, The York Hotel, on Avon Terrace below where Faversham House was to be built. (Note: It is possible that Monger converted Bland and Trimmer's barn to a hotel.) He formally purchased the land from Rivett Henry Bland and Arthur Trimmer for £100 in April 1838. In 1841, he established a general store opposite the hotel.

At his store, Monger sold goods for produce including wool and sandalwood, and became one of the major sandalwood exporters in the 1840s sandalwood boom. His sandalwood yards were below Faversham House.

In 1853, Monger paid for the town's first bridge, which was at Monger's crossing, below Faversham House and the sandalwood yards.

After building Faversham House, Monger began to be called the "Duke" (of York) by York residents.

A major event celebrated at Faversham House in 1857, was the return from London of John Henry Monger Jnr and his bride Henrietta Joaquina Manning.

== First stage - original house constructed some time between 1836 (Note: Assumes original use was as a cellar, Monger started the York Hotel in mid 1836.) and 1844 (Note: Estimated from date Monger moved out of The York Hotel: Inquirer, 13 November 1844, p.2.) ==
As the original house resembled a cellar for stores that could also be used as a defensive bunker with barred windows, there is a possibility that it was constructed in 1836 or soon after when there was some concern for safety of the settlers. It was occupied at least by the end of 1844. The house comprised a single-storey bond store with a residence, built into the side of the hill. It was constructed of stone quarried from the other side of Grey Street. Sheoak shingles were the original roof covering. The original home had five rooms; two bedrooms, kitchen, vestibule and a large storeroom with a wide door suitable for barrels. It had only one entrance and all windows were barred.

== Two storey addition (second stage - construction 1849 to 1851) ==
Two storeys were added to the first stage in the second stage, leaving the first stage as a cellar. The completion of this stage involved convict labour. This stage was completed before January 1852.

The house with the additional two storeys is one of the buildings shown in the engraving of York in The Illustrated London News of 28 February 1857, based on a drawing by Edmund Henderson.

== Wings added (third stage - 1868) ==
After the death of John Henry Monger Snr in 1867, his son John Henry Monger Jnr extended Faversham House. These additions included the two gabled wings north and south of the central section, verandahs, white railed balconies and high gabled turrets. The new north wing consisted of a large billiards room with bedrooms above; the new south wing contained a large dining room with nurseries and a nanny's room above.

== Fourth stage (1907) ==
On the death of John Henry Monger Jnr in 1892, Faversham House was inherited by his eldest son, Alexander J Monger. The property was leased out for a number of years while Alexander Monger attended to business in London.

In 1903, Alexander Monger returned from London with intentions of selling the property. However, after marrying Florence McCracken in 1906, he decided to restore the house.

Servants quarters were added. A wing running east and west on the southern end of the house was also built, providing a kitchen and staff dining room. Additions were built with locally produced bricks.

== 20th century ==
Mr & Mrs Alexander Monger lived in the house for the next thirty years. During their residence, Faversham House was a focal point for social events and business meetings.

At the beginning of World War Two, Mrs Monger presented Faversham House to the Australian Government and the Red Cross. During the war, Faversham House was used as a hospital and convalescent home for servicemen.

In 1944, men who had been in action in the Middle East and New Guinea were sent to Faversham House to recuperate. In 1945, the property was leased to the Dutch government to house refugees escaping from the war. The Returned and Services League of Australia also used Faversham House during this period.

After the war, Faversham House was put up for tender, as the Federal Government had no further use for it. In 1961, the Methodist Department of Christian Education bought the property for £500. On 20 April 1963, Faversham House, was officially opened as a Methodist conference centre, holiday home and educational facility.

In February 1994, Glenn and Judith Darlington purchased Faversham House. Over the next two years, they reported spending in excess of $300,000 for conservation work on the place, which they used as their home. They later opened up the home as an elegant bed and breakfast accommodation.

Faversham House has been further restored by its current owners Richard and Nola Bliss, who bought the property in 2003 and who use Faversham House for weddings and accommodation.

== Heritage listings ==
The building is listed on the Shire municipal inventory (31 December 1995), classified by the National Trust of Australia (1 November 1976) and on the Register of the National Estate (21 March 1978), and on the State Register Permanent (2 September 1997).
