= Rivett Henry Bland =

Colonial government administrator

Rivett (or Revett) Henry Bland (2 February 1811 – 18 February 1894) was an early settler and a government administrator in colonial Australia.

Bland was the son of Thomas Bland and Emma Revett, and was born at Newark, Nottinghamshire, on 2 February 1811. He was educated at the Newark grammar school, and at 14, studied for the medical profession at St. Bartholomew's Hospital, London but did not become a doctor. His brother was a member of the House of Commons.

== Western Australia ==
After leaving England in May 1829 for Western Australia on Marquis of Anglesea, he arrived in August at the age of 18 with his man-servant.

Because of the money and property he brought with him, he was granted 3,200 hectares (8,000 acres) on the left bank of the Swan River, a grant which extended almost 31 kilometres (19 mi) from the river, part of which became the Houghton estate.

In 1831, Bland was appointed by the Governor James Stirling to settle the York district, about 110 kilometres (70 mi) from Perth on the Avon River and to establish a stockyard there.

Bland was a member of the first party of settlers to journey to the Avon Valley that set off on 6 September 1831, and he selected a place 3.2 kilometres (2 mi) south of Mt Bakewell near a broad reach of the river. As instructed by Stirling, by the end of September 1831, Bland had built the first house in York 91 metres (100 yd) above the ford. (Note: The house was at least initially one room measuring ten feet by nine. The house was on York Suburban Lot A1 on what is now the south east corner of Avon Terrace and Ford St.)

As instructed by Stirling, Bland established the government farm 450 metres (1,480 ft) to the west of the Avon River ford. To do this, Bland went into partnership with Arthur Trimmer, who with his brothers had brought Merino sheep to the colony. Bland established the Government farm "mostly at his own expense". Bland was to run the farm but both of them worked on the farm for some years.

In 1832, Bland and Trimmer rented the 400-hectare (1,000-acre) Government stock farm for one peppercorn per annum for two years provided that Bland and Trimmer house soldiers sent to York. The Government later awarded 400 hectares (1,000 acres) on the east side of the river to Bland as a reward for having settled it.

Bland also received as grant south of the town. He called this land Balladong Farm from as early as 1831. (Note: Balladong Farm was originally Avon Locations U and V. Bland bought the adjoining Heal's grant with 2 roomed cottage in 1834. Balladong Farm was sold to Stephen Parker in 1848. Refer to Balladong Farm Conservation Plan.)

In July 1834 Bland was returning from Guildford when the following incident occurred:

Bland loaded his dray with flour [at Guildford] and set off for York, accompanied by a young boy named Souper. (Note: Edward Caleb Souper, who was then 12 years old.) A short distance out of Guildford, the party was overtaken by about 30 blacks who Bland said “evinced the most perfect amity and shook hands with his party, indicative of a cordial good understanding” which understanding Mr Bland fully understood. The next thing was a cry from Souper that he had been speared. The spear thrown from a screening bush passed through Souper’s arm, grazing the lapel of his coat. Bland immediately fired into the bushes where he could hear a rustling sound. The ambushers promptly made off.

In September 1834, the Perth Gazette reported:

The success which has attended Messrs Bland and Trimmer’s flock of Sheep at York, has created a general desire to enter upon this lucrative speculation, and many of our Settlers on the Swan, who have the means, as well as some few residents in the towns, are making preparations to remove to their larger grants over the hills, where an unlimited run for the flocks, and a soil adapted for agricultural purposes generally awaits them.

In December 1834, at the age of 23, Bland was appointed resident magistrate for the York district without salary. At the same time as he was the main civil servant in the district, he was also one of the most successful farmers in the Colony.

In June 1835, Trimmer was on his way to York when his cart broke down. He was compelled to go on for assistance. On his return, accompanied by Bland, when about 7 miles from their home at York, "they observed a native in the bush in the act of raising his spear, and shortly afterwards, a known signal being given, a party of about twelve rushed forward from the place of their concealment; but both Mr Trimmer and Mr Bland being apprised of their danger by the signal given, put spurs to their horses, and galloped about three miles, by which means they avoided their hostile assailants."

In July 1835, Bland and Trimmer lost 16 pigs "speared and carried off by natives". Bland became superintendent of the work for the improvement of the York road, and he also commenced planning an exploratory expedition 100 miles to the east of his farm at York.

The first town or suburban allotment of land in York was made to Trimmer and Bland on 31 July 1835, which they purchased for £20. (Note: This was Suburban Lot A1 on which their houses, a barn and mill-house were situated. The barn and millhouse were where the York Hotel was later to be situated. Bland and Trimmer later bought York Suburban Lot A2. Prior to making the grant of Lot A2, the Government unusually advertised seven times their intention to do so.)

By 1836, Trimmer and Bland had 5,000 sheep in York. Bland reported in 1836 that he had increased the flock at the rate of about 80 lambs to 100 ewes per annum. Lieutenant-Governor Stirling observed that if Bland were to stay in the Colony, he would become a wealthy man.

In September 1836, two or three natives gained access to Bland and Trimmer's barn. One was carrying away a quantity of flour and was shot by a man named Gallop, who had been hiding in the loft of the barn. Two days later, in reprisal an old settler called Knott was speared in his hut and robbed. Following this incident, the partnership between Bland and Trimmer was dissolved with effect from 1 October 1836.

In 1838, aged 26, Bland married Emily Sultizer (sometimes Lutzen) and around this time built "a very pleasant dwelling house" to live in at Balladong Farm. (Note: Also described as a "good farm house" in Chapter 7.)

After the murder of Sarah Cook by Aboriginal people in 1839, Bland complained that because of new measures to protect natives, he was prevented from arresting the natives suspected of the crime.

From 1840, Bland started sub-dividing part of Balladong Farm in an area which became known as Bland's Town, as it still is today. This included selling 10 acres to Peter Barrow, on which Barrow constructed St John's Church in 1840 and the building he used to try to establish Wallingford School. Bland bought this property back for 200 pounds in 1841. He also took Crown Grants of the farm that was to later be called "Daliak".

In 1841, Bland sold the farm Grass Dale to Thomas Brown, (Note: Thomas's wife Eliza was a prolific letter writer. Both she and Thomas wrote letters to her father, William Bussey, and to each other, many of which were published in the book "A Faithful Picture" by Peter Cowan.) and leased Balladong Farm, including a corn mill, to Henry Landor and Nathan Elias Knight.

Also in 1841, Bland became Protector of Natives at a salary triple that of the resident magistrate, being paid from England. He was recommended for the job by Governor John Hutt who described Bland's "thorough knowledge of the native character, acquaintance with their languages, great firmness combined with mildness of temper, long experience as a Magistrate and a high reputation for integrity and respectability, which gives him considerable influence among both the Colonists and the native population in the York district".

Bland had been suffering from eye trouble for some time, and in 1842, Dr Harris (Colonial Surgeon) advised him to take 18 months leave and return to England for treatment. Bland resigned as resident magistrate in September 1842. Historian John Deacon said of Bland as government resident for 8 years:

During that period he had proved himself to be a man of sterling qualities, carrying on the onereous duties of magistrate in a pioneer settlement with distinction and success. His letters reveal that he possessed those qualities which make for leadership; while he resided in York he had the esteem of both the settlers and the Government, and at all times he had dispensed justice with an impartial hand.

While in England, he secured a contract with the British Admiralty to supply 400 loads of Western Australian timber. He also lobbied for more Parkhurst lads to ease the labour shortage in Western Australia.

A few months after his return from England in 1845, Bland lost his wife in childbirth. In September 1846, Bland was appointed acting Government Resident of Albany.

In 1847, Bland sold "Daliak" to Thomas Carter and Henry Carter on terms, and in 1848, Bland sold Balladong Farm to the Parker family.

On 6 February 1848, Governor Charles Fitzgerald appointed Bland as personal secretary and Clerk of the Council in place of Walkinshaw Cowan. He remarried Martha Hinds (née McCallum), the widow of Richard Brinsley Hinds, on 26 December 1848 in St George's Church, Perth.

Towards the end of 1848 he accompanied Fitzgerald on an expedition to Champion Bay, for the purpose of examining a lode of galena, discovered on the Murchison River by Augustus Charles Gregory. The party consisted of Fitzgerald, Bland, Gregory, three soldiers, and a servant. The discovery was verified, but on the return journey Fitzgerald was speared in the leg by some Aboriginal people, and Bland had a narrow escape.

From January 1849 until June 1850, he became Acting Colonial Secretary.

He was expected to have been appointed as Colonial Secretary but the appointment did not take place because he had to sail to South Australia for treatment of an ever-worrying eye complaint, which eventually resulted in the loss of one eye, and so he returned to England. In 1851, Bland wrote a paper entitled "On the character, habits and customs of the Aborigines of Western Australia".

== Victoria ==
In 1852 he was appointed resident director of the Port Phillip and Colonial Gold Mining Company, and arrived in Melbourne towards the end of that year. In 1856 he arranged with the proprietors of some land at Clunes to commence mining operations on some quartz lodes, and erected an extensive plant of machinery in conjunction with a party of miners, afterwards called the Clunes Quartz Mining Company. This mine has continued to be worked to the present time with varying results. The total gold, raised from 1857 to 1884 was 506,220 ounces (14,351 kg), of the value of £2,029,078 13s. 7d., giving a profit of nearly half a million from an outlay under £20,000.

He became a director of the National Bank from 1863 to 1865.

He died in the colony of Victoria on 18 February 1894, and his estate in England was proved in London on 23 May 1895.

When his coffin left Clunes for Ballarat and Melbourne it did so to half-masted flags and a chorus of steam whistles. The house he lived in at Clunes survives.

All his children died in childbirth or in infancy and his second wife also predeceased him.
