= Electoral district of Mount Burges =

Former electoral district in Western Australia

Mount Burges Western Australia—Legislative Assembly
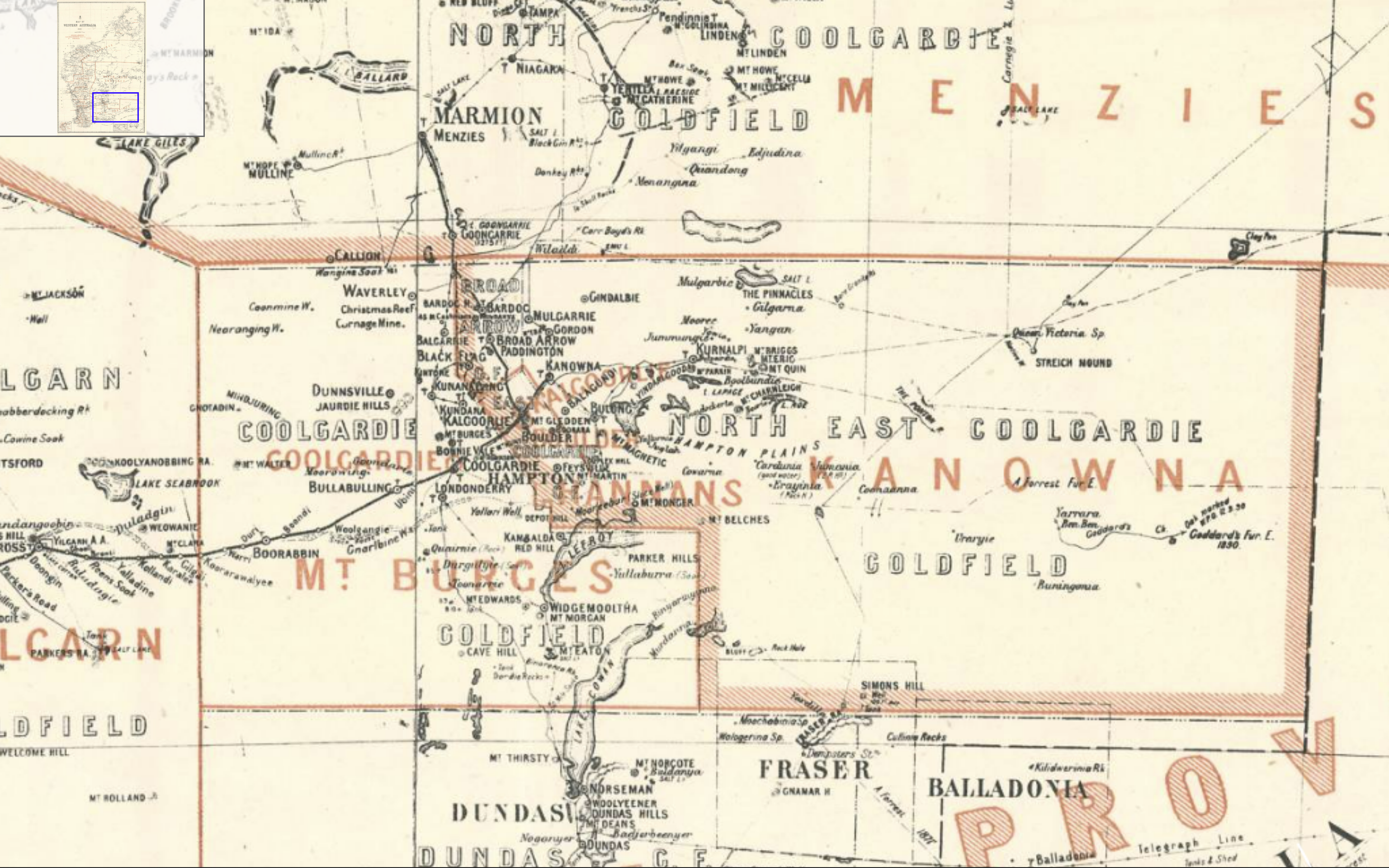
- Mount Burges and surrounds, 1900
- State: Western Australia
- Dates current: 1901–1904
- Namesake: Mount Burges

Mount Burges was an electoral district of the Legislative Assembly in the Australian state of Western Australia from 1901 to 1904.

The district was located in the Eastern Goldfields and was created from the outer regions of the seat of Coolgardie, which was reduced to the town of the same name. It was named after the town of Mount Burges and also included Boorabbin, Bullabulling, Kambalda, Londonderry, Dunnsville, Widgiemooltha, Bonnie Vale, Kundana, Kintore, Kunanalling, Balgarri, and Waverley. It existed for one term of parliament, and was represented in that time by Labor member Fergie Reid.

== Members for Mount Burges ==
Member	Party	Term
Fergie Reid	Labour	1901–1904
