= KDB =

KDB may refer to:

== Sport ==
- Kevin De Bruyne

== Organizations ==
- Kansas Dental Board, US
- Korea Development Bank
- State Security Committee of the Republic of Belarus
- Committee for State Security, of Soviet Ukraine

== Computing ==
- Kdb+, a database server
- KDB, a Linux kernel debugger

== Transport ==
- Kambalda Airport, IATA airport code "KDB"
- Kidbrooke railway station, London, England (National Rail station code)

== Other uses ==
- KDB (FM), a radio station, Santa Barbara, California, US
- KDB (Brunei) (Royal Brunei Ship), ship prefix
- Kevin De Bruyne, Belgian footballer
- Kirby's Dream Buffet, a 2022 party game

== See also ==
- Beechcraft MQM-61 Cardinal, a target drone, formerly KDB-1
