= Tommy Windich =

Indigenous Western Australian explorer (1840–1876)

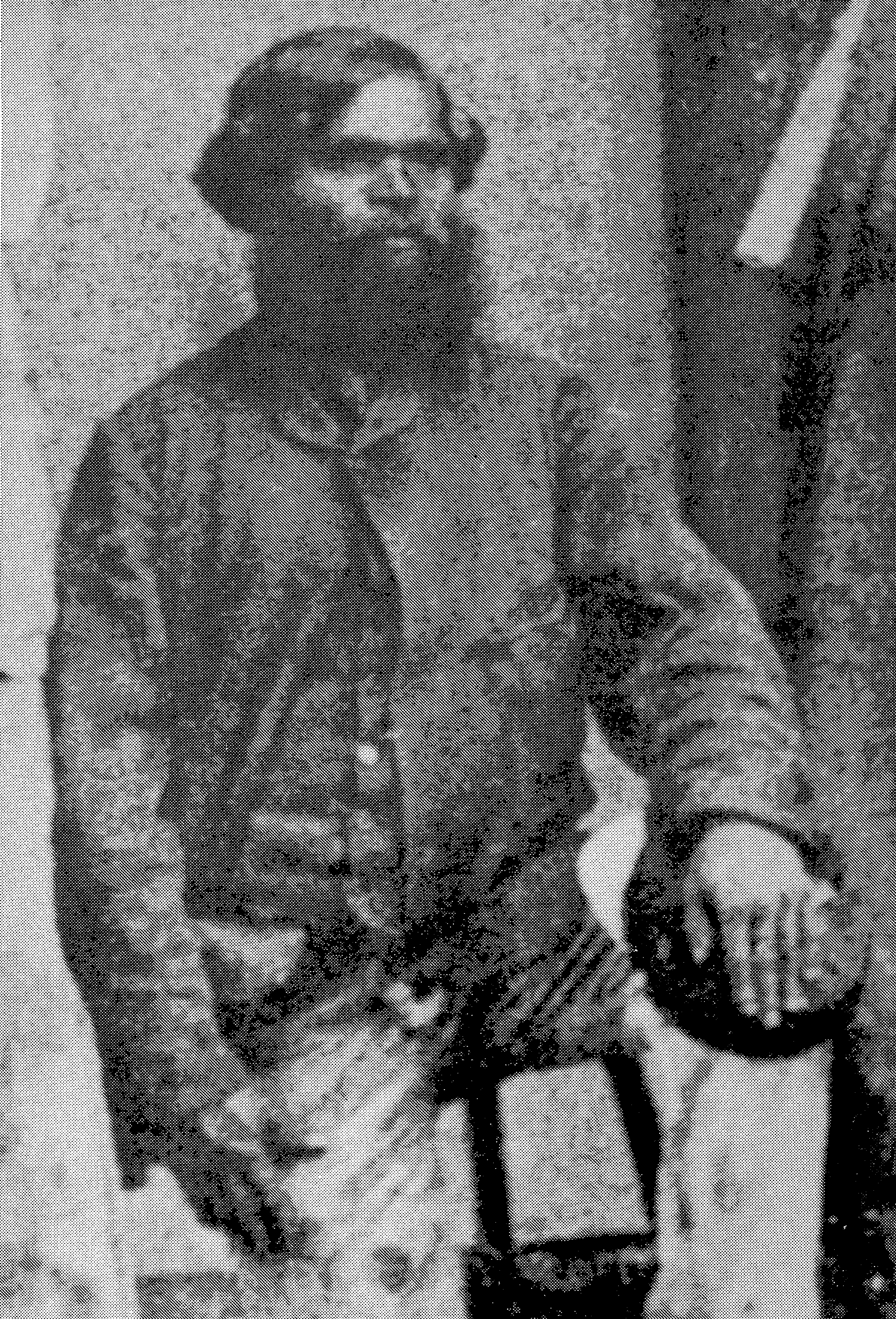
- Born: 1840
- Died: 1876 (aged 35–36)
- Occupation: Explorer

Tommy Windich (c. 1840 – c. 20 February 1876) was an Indigenous Australian member of a number of exploring expeditions in Western Australia in the 1860s and 1870s.

Tommy Windich (or Windiitj) was born around 1840 near Mount Stirling in Western Australia. Little is known of his youth, but his skills in tracking and knowledge of a number of Aboriginal languages suggest a traditional upbringing, whereas his skills in horseriding and marksmanship indicate extensive contact with colonial culture.

By the early 1860s, Windich was working as a "native assistant" in the police force at York, where his main tasks were to assist in the tracking of escaped convicts, Aborigines who were wanted by the authorities, and escaped horses.

In 1863, he joined the first aboriginal assistant policeman Cowits to accompany Henry Maxwell Lefroy on his expedition east of York to the interior.

In 1865 he tracked and helped to recapture a prison escapee named Joseph Johns, who would later become the notorious bushranger Moondyne Joe. Early in 1866 he helped to capture three Aborigines who had murdered a pastoralist, one of whom fought against his arrest, spearing Windich in the arm. This expedition appears to have made Windich's name as a superb tracker and a reliable and useful member of any travelling party, for he was afterwards in constant demand.

Windich and Cowits joined Constable Edwards in the police expedition east in May 1866 which discovered petroleum.

Sometime in 1866 Windich was stationed to Beverley, where he continued his usual work as a native assistant, but was also sent on a number of exploring expeditions. Windich's next exploratory expedition (also with Cowits) was the third expedition of the explorer Charles Hunt. The objective was to explore the area east of the Hampton Plains but an unseasonal drought caused a great shortage of water and feed for the horses, and they were forced to abandon their plans and return to York.

In 1869, Windich was a member of John Forrest's first expedition, which searched without success for clues to the fate of the long-lost explorer Ludwig Leichhardt in the desert west of the site of the present-day town of Leonora. The following year, he was a member of Forrest's second expedition, which surveyed Edward John Eyre's route between the colonies of Western Australia and South Australia along the coast of the Great Australian Bight. In 1871, Windich was part of another attempt to explore the land beyond the Hampton Plains, this time under the guidance of Alexander Forrest. This expedition discovered about 1,200 square kilometres (460 sq mi) of pastoral land, half of which was of fine quality, but also found water to be extremely scarce. In 1874, Windich was a member of John Forrest's third and most ambitious expedition. This expedition explored the watershed of the Murchison River, discovering much new pastoral land, then headed east through the uncharted centre of Western Australia, to the overland telegraph line from Darwin to Adelaide.

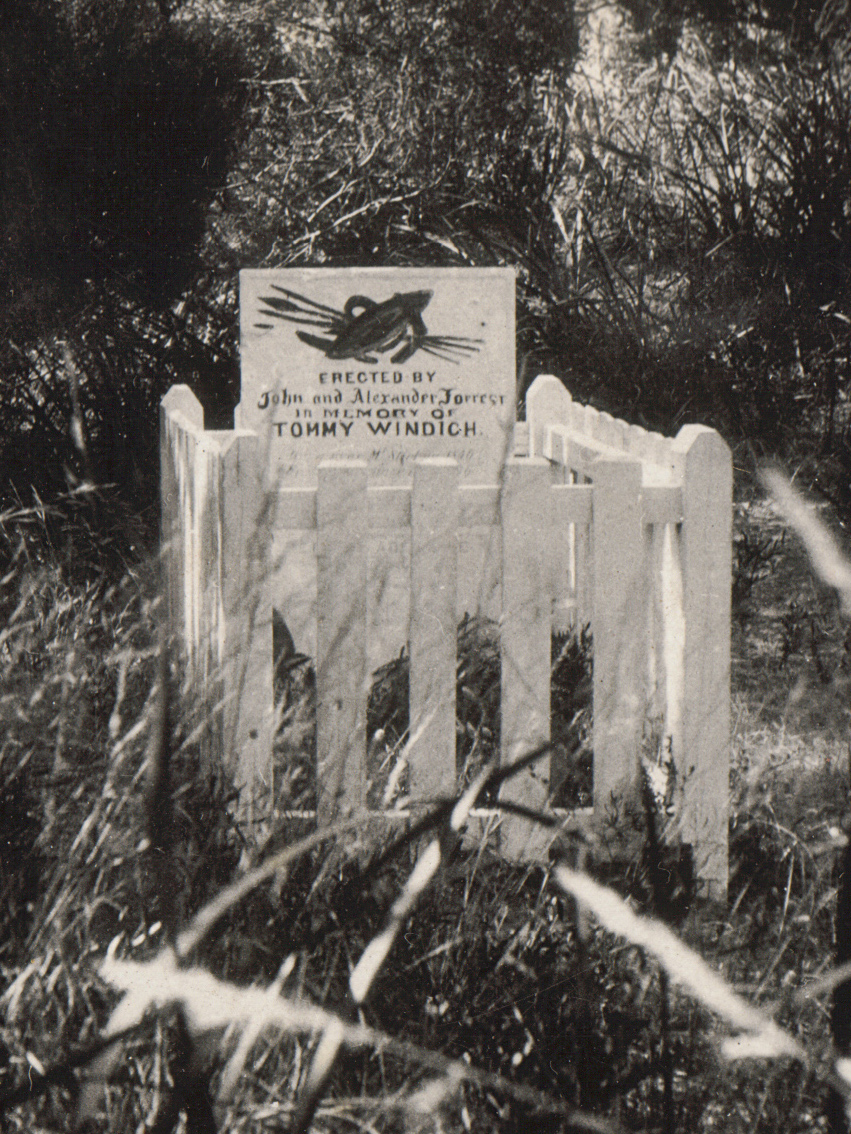
Windich's grave, Esperance, 1929.

Early in 1876, Windich was working as a guide with the party constructing the overland telegraph line from Perth to Adelaide, when he caught a chill that became a serious illness. On about 20 February, he died of pneumonia. He was buried at Dempster Head near Esperance. John Forrest said at the time

"his name is almost a household word in this colony.... I feel that I have lost an old and well tried companion and friend."

== Cultural references ==
In September 1988, a cultivar of barley, bred by the Western Australian Department of Agriculture for performance in medium to high rainfall areas, was released under the name "Hordeum vulgare (Barley) c.v. Windich". Commonly referred to simply as "Windich", the cultivar is named for Tommy Windich, continuing a tradition of naming Western Australian grain cultivars after historic people of Western Australia.

== See also ==
- List of Indigenous Australian historical figures
