= Electoral results for the district of Mount Burges =

Western Australian district election results

This is a list of electoral results for the Electoral district of Mount Burges in Western Australian state elections.

== Members for Mount Burges ==
Member	Party	Term
Fergie Reid	Labour	1901–1904

== Election results ==
=== Elections in the 1900s ===
1901 Western Australian state election: Mount Burges
Party	Candidate	Votes	%	±%
Labour	Fergie Reid	586	69.0	+69.0
Opposition	Charles McDowall	261	30.7	+30.7
Independent	J. Thompson	2	0.2	+0.2
Total formal votes		849	98.4	n/a
Informal votes		14	1.6	n/a
Turnout		863	33.6	n/a
Labour win		(new seat)		

- J. (Joseph?) Thompson withdrew from the race after the close of nominations, and his name consequently remained on the ballot paper.
