= Dunnsville =

Dunnsville may refer to:

- Dunnsville, Virginia
- Dunnsville, Western Australia

== See also ==
- Dunsville, a village in South Yorkshire, England
