= Kambalda East, Western Australia =

Kambalda East
- Town
- Coordinates: 31°12′07″S 121°40′05″E
- Country: Australia
- State: Western Australia
- LGA(s): Shire of Coolgardie
- Location: 561 km (349 mi) from Perth; 57 km (35 mi) from Kalgoorlie; 60 km (37 mi) from Coolgardie

Government
  - State electorate(s): Kalgoorlie
  - Federal division(s): O'Connor

Area
  - Total: 101.8 km^{2} (39.3 sq mi)

Population
  - Total(s): 802 (SAL 2021)
- Postcode: 6442

Kambalda East is a town in the Goldfields-Esperance region of Western Australia, located in the Shire of Coolgardie local government area. It forms part of the broader Kambalda township, which is formally divided into Kambalda East and Kambalda West. Kambalda East recorded a population of 802 at the 2021 census.

An early mining settlement named Kambalda (originally Red Hill) existed on the same site as the current Kambalda East in the 1890s and 1900s.

The modern town of Kambalda East was originally built as a closed company town by WMC Resources in 1967 following commencement of nickel mining in 1966. It was laid out in a grid pattern on the location of the original, long-gone Kambalda townsite, with streets and lots completely redrawn rather than follow the original layout. It had 300 residents by August 1967. It was known just as Kambalda until 1969, when the discovery of nickel reserves west of the township saw plans for further town expansion halted and a second townsite, Kambalda West, established 4 kilometres (2.5 mi) to the west, with the town's commercial centre established there instead.

During its period as a company town, WMC Resources built and owned all the housing, built all the town's community facilities, and was responsible for provision of essential services; it was described as having "dominated" the town. Housing in Kambalda East was "not as well constructed or as appealing" as that at newer Kambalda West, with some homes being "transportables". Early facilities were centred on Kambalda East: a workers' club, the Kambalda Club, opened in 1967, Kambalda Primary School opened in 1968, and Kambalda Football Club played their first match in 1969. (The football club would relocate to a new oval at Kambalda West in 1971.) WMC Resources began selling their company housing to workers from 1986, with town services eventually transitioned to state and local government control when WMC Resources began exiting Kambalda in the 2000s.

Kambalda East is often described as "residential-industrial" in nature, compared to "residential-commercial" Kambalda West.
