= Styphelia saxicola =

Conservation status
- Priority Three — Poorly Known Taxa (DEC)

Scientific classification
- Kingdom: Plantae
- Clade: Tracheophytes
- Clade: Angiosperms
- Clade: Eudicots
- Clade: Asterids
- Order: Ericales
- Family: Ericaceae
- Genus: Styphelia
- Species: S. saxicola

Binomial name
- Styphelia saxicola Hislop

Species of plant

Styphelia saxicola is a species of flowering plant in the heath family Ericaceae and is endemic to inland Western Australia. It is an erect shrub with sharply-pointed, linear or very narrowly elliptic leaves and white or pale cream-coloured, tube-shaped flowers usually arranged in groups of 2 or 3 in leaf axils.

== Description ==
Styphelia saxicola is an erect shrub that typically grows up to 1.0 m (3 ft 3 in) high and wide. Its leaves are linear to very narrowly elliptic or very narrowly triangular, 6–14 mm (0.24–0.55 in) long and 0.9–1.5 mm (0.035–0.059 in) wide, on a petiole 0.3–0.6 mm (0.012–0.024 in) long, the edges curved down and the tip sharply-pointed. The flowers are hairy and usually arranged in groups of 2 or 3 in leaf axils, with broadly egg-shaped to almost round bracts 0.7–1.0 mm (0.028–0.039 in) long, and similarly shaped bracteoles 1.0–1.3 mm (0.039–0.051 in) long at the base. The sepals are narrowly egg-shaped, 2.5–3.0 mm (0.098–0.118 in) long, straw-coloured to pale brown, sometimes tinged with pink. The petals are white or pale cream-coloured, and joined at the base to form a tube 3.3–4.7 mm (0.13–0.19 in) long, the lobes 3.0–4.6 mm (0.12–0.18 in) long and hairy inside. Flowering occurs between April and September and the fruit is a narrowly elliptic drupe 3.6–4.5 mm (0.14–0.18 in) long.

== Taxonomy and naming ==
Styphelia deserticola was first formally described in 2020 by Michael Hislop in the journal Swainsona from specimens he collected near Bulfinch in 2006. The specific epithet (saxicola) means "rock-inhabitant" or "stone-inhabitant".

== Distribution and habitat ==
This styphelia grows in rocky places from Bulfinch to Bullabulling and Diemals in the Coolgardie and Yalgoo bioregions of inland Western Australia.

== Conservation status ==
Styphelia saxicola is classified as "Priority Three" by the Western Australian Government Department of Biodiversity, Conservation and Attractions, meaning that it is poorly known and known from only a few locations but is not under imminent threat.
