= Acacia epedunculata =

Conservation status
- Priority One — Poorly Known Taxa (DEC)

Scientific classification
- Kingdom: Plantae
- Clade: Tracheophytes
- Clade: Angiosperms
- Clade: Eudicots
- Clade: Rosids
- Order: Fabales
- Family: Fabaceae
- Subfamily: Caesalpinioideae
- Clade: Mimosoid clade
- Genus: Acacia
- Species: A. epedunculata

Binomial name
- Acacia epedunculata R.S.Cowan & Maslin

Synonyms
- Racosperma epedunculatum (R.S.Cowan & Maslin) Pedley

Species of legume

Acacia epedunculata is a species of flowering plant in the family Fabaceae and is endemic to inland south-western Western Australia. It is a spreading shrub with linear phyllodes, spherical heads of golden yellow flowers, and linear, thinly crusty pods covered with silky hairs.

== Description ==
Acacia epedunculata is a spreading shrub that typically grows to a height of 50–65 cm (20–26 in) high and has branchlets covered with silky hairs between glabrous, resinous ribs. Its phyllodes are linear, shallowly curved to straight, 40–45 mm (1.6–1.8 in) long, 1.3–1.6 mm (0.051–0.063 in) wide and more or less coarsely sharply pointed. There are three veins on each face of the phyllodes, but only the central vein is visible when the phyllodes are narrow. The flowers are borne in a sessile, spherical head in axils, the heads about 4.5 mm (0.18 in) in diameter with about 20 golden yellow flowers. Flowering has been recorded in August, and the pods are linear, not raised over but more or less shallowly constricted between the somewhat widely spaced seeds, up to 65 mm (2.6 in) long, 2 mm (0.079 in) wide, thinly crust-like, and covered with minute silvery, silky hairs on dark brown faces. The seeds are narrowly elliptic, 3.2–3.5 mm (0.13–0.14 in) long, glossy mottled light and dark brown with a conical aril on the end, about as long as the seed.

== Taxonomy ==
Acacia epedunculata was first formally described by Richard Sumner Cowan and Bruce Maslin in the journal Nuytsia from specimens collected by Maslin near Bullabulling in 1971. The specific epithet (epedunculata) means 'lacking a peduncle', referring to the sessile flower heads.

== Distribution and habitat ==
This species of wattle is only known from near Bullabulling, about 30 km (19 mi) west of Coolgardie, where it grows on sandplain in deep yellow sand in open shrubland in the Coolgardie and Murchison bioregions of inland south=western Western Australia.

== Conservation status ==
Acacia epedunculata is listed as "Priority One" by the Government of Western Australia Department of Biodiversity, Conservation and Attractions, meaning that it is known from only one or a few locations that are potentially at risk.

== See also ==
- List of Acacia species
