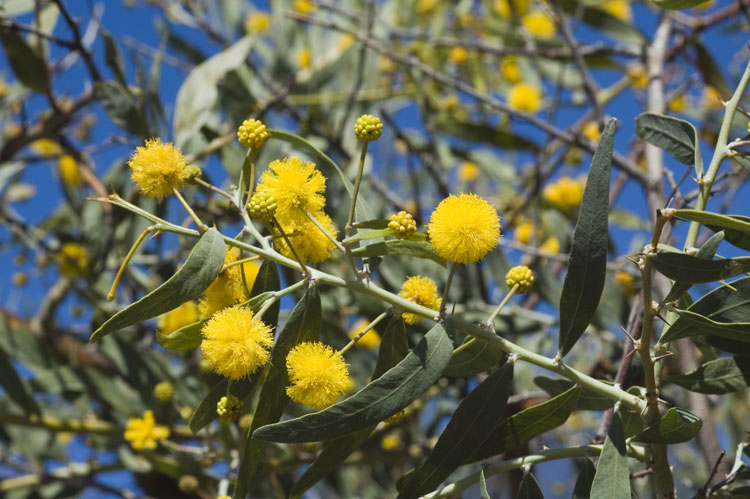

Scientific classification
- Kingdom: Plantae
- Clade: Tracheophytes
- Clade: Angiosperms
- Clade: Eudicots
- Clade: Rosids
- Order: Fabales
- Family: Fabaceae
- Subfamily: Caesalpinioideae
- Clade: Mimosoid clade
- Genus: Acacia
- Species: A. dempsteri

Binomial name
- Acacia dempsteri F.Muell.
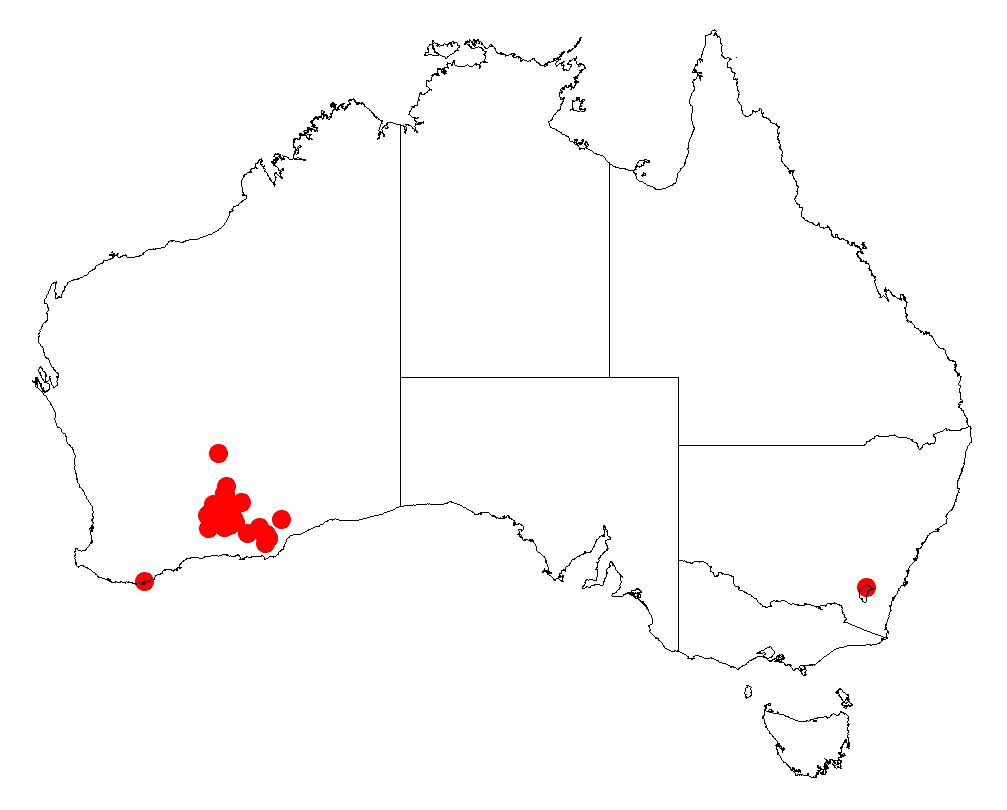
- Occurrence data from AVH

Synonyms
- Racosperma dempsteri (F.Muell.) Pedley

= Acacia dempsteri =

Species of legume

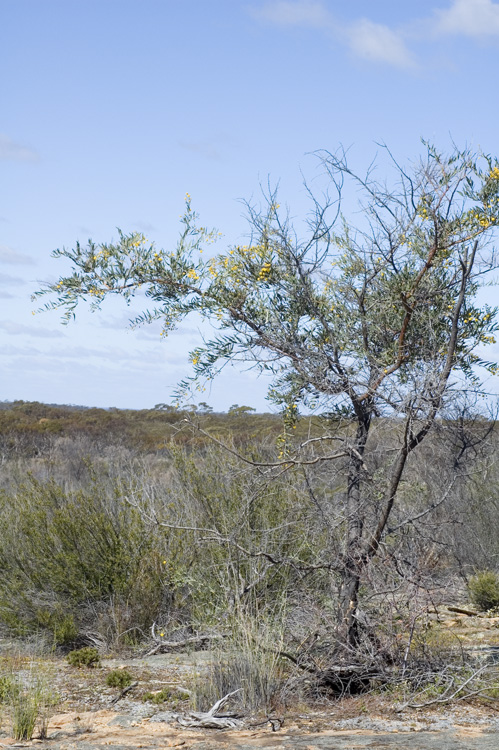
Habit

Acacia dempsteri is a species of flowering plant in the family Fabaceae and is endemic to the south-west of Western Australia. It is a straggly, prickly shrub or tree with lance-shaped to narrowly lance-shaped phyllodes, large spherical heads of golden yellow flowers and narrowly oblong, firmly papery pods.

== Description ==
Acacia dempsteri is a straggly, prickly shrub that typically grows to a height of 1.2 to 4 metres (4 to 13 ft) and has glabrous branchlets covered with a whitish, powdery bloom. The phyllodes are lance-shaped to narrowly lance-shaped, straight to slightly curved or slightly s-shaped, 30–60 mm (1.2–2.4 in) long and 4–10 mm (0.16–0.39 in) wide and thinly leathery with a prominent midrib. There are spiny stipules 5–12 mm (0.20–0.47 in) long at the base of the phyllodes. The flowers are borne in one or two spherical heads in axils on a peduncle 15–25 mm (0.59–0.98 in) long, each head about 10 mm (0.39 in) in diameter with 40 to 50 golden yellow flowers. Flowering occurs in September and October, and the pods are narrowly oblong, firmly papery, up to 50 mm (2.0 in) long, 8–11 mm (0.31–0.43 in) wide, dark brown and glabrous. The seeds are oblong, 3–4 mm (0.12–0.16 in) long and mostly dark brown with a folded aril.

== Taxonomy ==
Acacia dempsteri was first formally described in 1879 by the botanist Ferdinand von Mueller in his Fragmenta Phytographiae Australiae from specimens collected by Andrew Dempster. The specific epithet (dempsteri) honours the collector of the type specimens.

== Distribution ==
This species of wattle has a scattered distribution from near Kambalda south to Gilmore Rocks (about 50 km (31 mi)) north of Salmon Gums where it is found amongst granite outcrops growing in skeletal sandy or loamy soils in shrubland or mallee in the Coolgardie and Mallee bioregions in the south-west of Western Australia.

== See also ==
- List of Acacia species
