= John Forrest =

Australian politician (1847–1918)

The Right Honourable Sir John Forrest GCMG
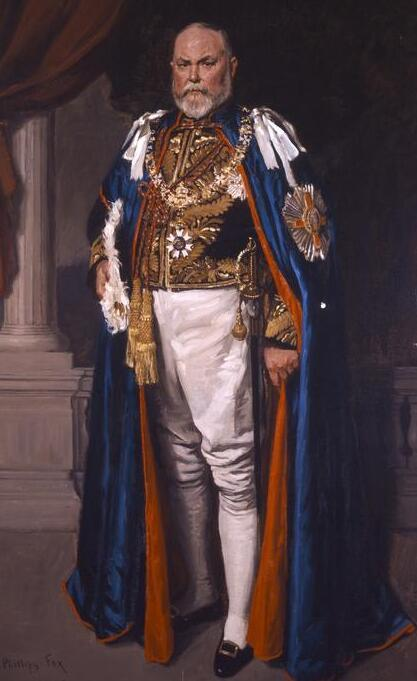

Treasurer of Australia
- In office 17 February 1917 – 26 March 1918
- Prime Minister: Billy Hughes
- Preceded by: Alexander Poynton
- Succeeded by: William Watt
- In office 24 June 1913 – 16 September 1914
- Prime Minister: Joseph Cook
- Preceded by: Andrew Fisher
- Succeeded by: Andrew Fisher
- In office 2 June 1909 – 28 April 1910
- Prime Minister: Alfred Deakin
- Preceded by: Andrew Fisher
- Succeeded by: Andrew Fisher
- In office 4 July 1905 – 29 July 1907
- Prime Minister: Alfred Deakin
- Preceded by: George Turner
- Succeeded by: William Lyne

Minister for Home Affairs
- In office 11 August 1903 – 27 April 1904
- Prime Minister: Edmund Barton; Alfred Deakin
- Preceded by: William Lyne
- Succeeded by: Lee Batchelor

Minister for Defence
- In office 17 January 1901 – 11 August 1903
- Prime Minister: Edmund Barton
- Preceded by: James Dickson
- Succeeded by: James Drake

Postmaster-General of Australia
- In office 1 January – 17 January 1901
- Prime Minister: Edmund Barton
- Preceded by: Office established
- Succeeded by: James Drake

Premier of Western Australia
- In office 22 December 1890 – 15 February 1901
- Monarchs: Queen Victoria; Edward VII
- Governor: William Robinson; Gerard Smith
- Preceded by: Office established
- Succeeded by: George Throssell

Personal details
- Born: 22 August 1847 Bunbury, Colony of Western Australia
- Died: 2 September 1918 (aged 71) Atlantic Ocean (Note: Off the African coast, near the British Colony of Sierra Leone.)
- Resting place: Karrakatta Cemetery
- Party: Nationalist (1917–1918); Liberal (1909–1917); Western Australian Party (1906–1909); Protectionist (1901–1906); Independent (1890–1901)
- Spouse: Margaret Elvire Hamersley (m. 1876)

Sir John Forrest GCMG (22 August 1847 – 2 September 1918) was an Australian explorer and politician. He was the first premier of Western Australia (1890–1901) and a long-serving cabinet minister in federal politics.

Forrest was born in Bunbury, Western Australia, to Scottish immigrant parents. He was the colony's first locally born surveyor, coming to public notice in 1869 when he led an expedition into the interior in search of Ludwig Leichhardt. The following year, Forrest accomplished the first land crossing from Perth to Adelaide across the Nullarbor Plain. His third expedition in 1874 travelled from Geraldton to Adelaide through the centre of Australia. Forrest's expeditions were characterised by a cautious, well-planned approach and diligent record-keeping. He received the Patron's Medal of the Royal Geographical Society in 1876.

Forrest became involved in politics through his promotion to surveyor-general, a powerful position that entitled him to a seat on the colony's executive council. He was appointed as Western Australia's first premier in 1890, following the granting of responsible government. The gold rushes of the early 1890s saw a large increase in the colony's population and allowed for a program of public works, including the construction of Fremantle Harbour and the Goldfields Water Supply Scheme. Forrest's government also passed a number of social reforms, maintaining power through several elections in an era before formal political parties. His support for Federation was crucial in Western Australia's decision to join as an original member.

In 1901, Forrest was invited to join Prime Minister Edmund Barton's inaugural federal cabinet. He was a member of all but one non-Labor government over the following two decades, serving as Postmaster-General (1901), Minister for Defence (1901–1903), Minister for Home Affairs (1903–1904), and Treasurer (1905–1907, 1909–1910, 1913–1914, 1917–1918). He helped shape Australia's early defence and financial policies, also lobbying for the construction of the Trans-Australian Railway, a pet project. Forrest served briefly as acting prime minister in 1907 and in 1913 was defeated for the leadership of the Liberal Party by a single vote. He was nominated to the peerage in 1918 by Prime Minister Billy Hughes, but died on his way to England before the appointment could be confirmed.

== Early life ==
=== Birth and family background ===
Forrest was born on 22 August 1847 on his father's property 2 miles (3.2 km) outside of Bunbury, Western Australia. He was the fourth of ten children and third of nine sons born to Margaret (née Hill) and William Forrest. The couple's first child and only daughter, Mary, died as an infant. John's younger brothers included Alexander and David Forrest, who became public figures in their own right.

Forrest's parents had arrived from Scotland in December 1842, accompanying Dr John Ferguson to work as domestic servants on his farm in the newly settled district of Australind. Margaret was from Dundee and William from Kincardineshire; the Forrest paternal line originated from the village of Glenbervie. They were released from Ferguson's service in 1846, and William took up a property at the mouth of the Preston River on the eastern side of the Leschenault Estuary. He built a windmill and a small house, where John was born.

=== Childhood and education ===
A few years after Forrest's birth, the family moved down the Preston River to Picton, where William built a homestead and watermill. The family's youngest son, Augustus, drowned in the mill race as a toddler. The mill was primarily used as a flour mill, at a time when flour was a scarce commodity, but was also used as a sawmill. Its success allowed William to expand his land holdings to 400 acres (160 ha) and gave the family a high social status in the small district around Bunbury. The property remains in the ownership of his descendants and is now heritage-listed.

Forrest and his brothers began their education at the one-room school in Bunbury, walking or riding 4 miles (6.4 km) in each direction. His parents prized education, and in 1860 he was sent to Perth to board at Bishop Hale's School, the only secondary school in the colony. He attended the school for four years, winning several prizes for arithmetic. Although three of William Forrest's sons became members of parliament, he had no involvement in public life beyond a local level and was not known to hold strong political opinions. According to John Forrest's biographer Frank Crowley, "William Forrest's greatest gift to his sons was not a precise political creed but the practical approach to life that he had acquired as a tradesman, farmer and jack-of-all-trades".

=== Early career ===
In November 1863, aged 16, Forrest took up an apprenticeship with Thomas Campbell Carey, the government surveyor at Bunbury. He had already been taught celestial navigation by his father, and under Carey learned the basic techniques of surveying, becoming proficient in traversing and the use of surveyors' tools, including Gunter's chains, prismatic compasses, sextants, and transit theodolites. He was also a skilled horseman and able to endure long periods in the bush without access to fresh meat and vegetables.

After two years as an apprentice to Carey, Forrest was appointed as a government surveyor on a provisional basis. He was the first person born in Western Australia to qualify as a surveyor. His term of employment began on 28 December 1865, at the age of 18, and he was assigned three assistants – a chainer, a camp-keeper, and a convict on probation. Although he was headquartered in Bunbury, Forrest spent most of his time in the field, surveying the Nelson, Sussex, and Wellington land districts. His position was made permanent in July 1866, and he spent most of the next two years in the Avon Valley.

== Marriage ==
On 2 September 1876 in Perth, Forrest married Margaret Elvire Hamersley. The Hamersleys were a very wealthy family, and Forrest gained substantially in wealth and social standing from the marriage. However, to their disappointment the marriage was childless. Despite not having direct descendants his family has continued to be influential in Western Australia via his nephew Mervyn Forrest and Mervyn's grandson mining billionaire Andrew Forrest.

== Explorer ==
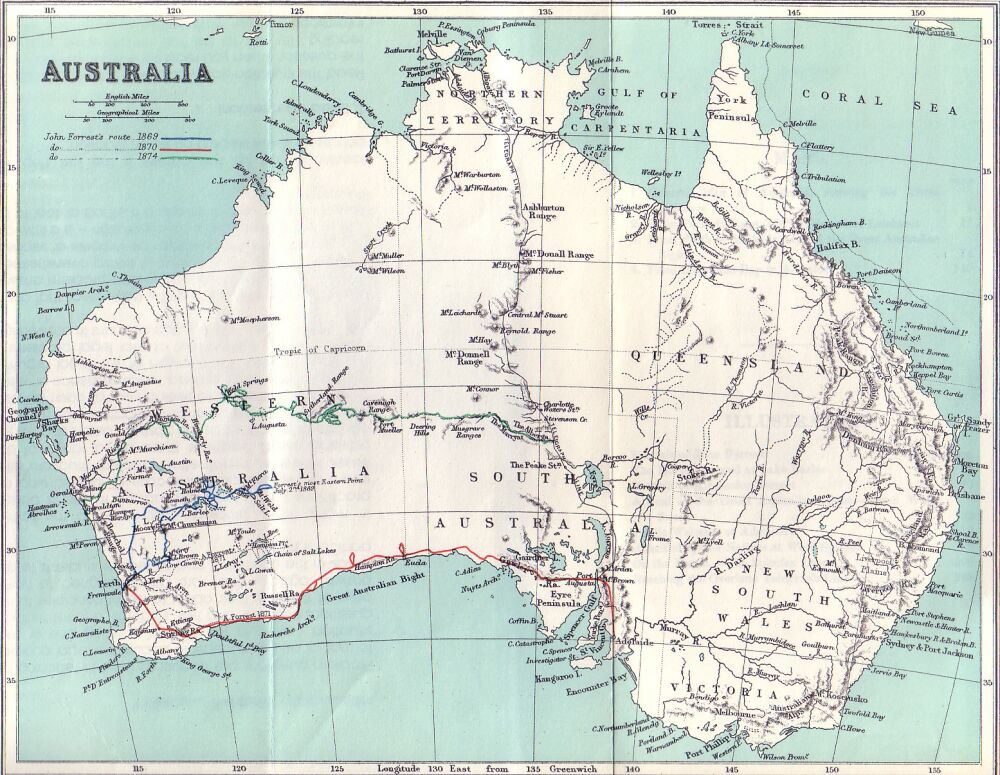
Forrest's explorations, as pictured in his book, Explorations in Australia.

Between 1869 and 1874, Forrest led three expeditions into the uncharted land surrounding the colony of Western Australia. In 1869, he led a fruitless search for the explorer Ludwig Leichhardt in the desert west of the site of the present town of Leonora. The following year, he surveyed Edward John Eyre's land route, from Perth to Adelaide. In 1874, he led a party to the watershed of the Murchison River and then east through the unknown desert centre of Western Australia. Forrest published an account of his expeditions, Explorations in Australia, in 1875. In 1882, he was made a Commander of the Order of St Michael and St George (CMG) by Queen Victoria for his services in exploring the interior.

=== Search for Ludwig Leichhardt ===
In March 1869, Forrest was asked to lead an expedition in search of Leichhardt, who had been missing since April 1848. A few years earlier, a party of Aborigines had told the explorer Charles Hunt that a group of white men had been killed by Aborigines a long time ago, and some time afterwards, an Aboriginal tracker named Jemmy Mungaro had corroborated their story and claimed to have personally been to the location. Since it was thought that these stories might refer to Leichhardt's party, Forrest was asked to lead a party to the site, with Mungaro as their guide and there to search for evidence of Leichhardt's fate.

Forrest assembled a party of six, including the Aboriginal trackers Mungaro and Tommy Windich, and they left Perth on 15 April 1869. They headed in a north-easterly direction, passing through the colony's furthermost sheep station on 26 April. On 6 May, they encountered a group of Aborigines who offered to guide the party to a place where there were many skeletons of horses. Forrest's team accompanied this group in a more northerly direction, but after a week of travelling it became clear that their destination was Poison Rock, where the explorer Robert Austin was known to have left eleven of his horses for dead in 1854. They then turned once more towards the location indicated by their guide.

The team arrived in the location to be searched on 28 May. They then spent almost three weeks surveying and searching an area of about 15,000 km^{2} in the desert west of the site of the present-day town of Leonora. Having found no evidence of Leichhardt's fate, and Mungaro having changed his story and admitted that he had not personally visited the site, they decided to push as far eastwards as they could on their remaining supplies. The expedition reached its furthest point east on 2 July, near the present-day site of the town of Laverton. They then turned for home, returning by a more northerly route and arriving back in Perth on 6 August.

They had been absent for 113 days, and had travelled, by Forrest's reckoning, over 3,600 kilometres (2,200 mi), most of it through uncharted desert. They had found no sign of Leichhardt, and the country over which they travelled was useless for farming. However, Forrest did report that his compass had been affected by the presence of minerals in the ground, and he suggested that the government send geologists to examine the area. Ultimately, the expedition achieved very little, but it was of great personal advantage to Forrest whose reputation with his superiors and in the community at large was greatly enhanced.

=== Bight crossing ===
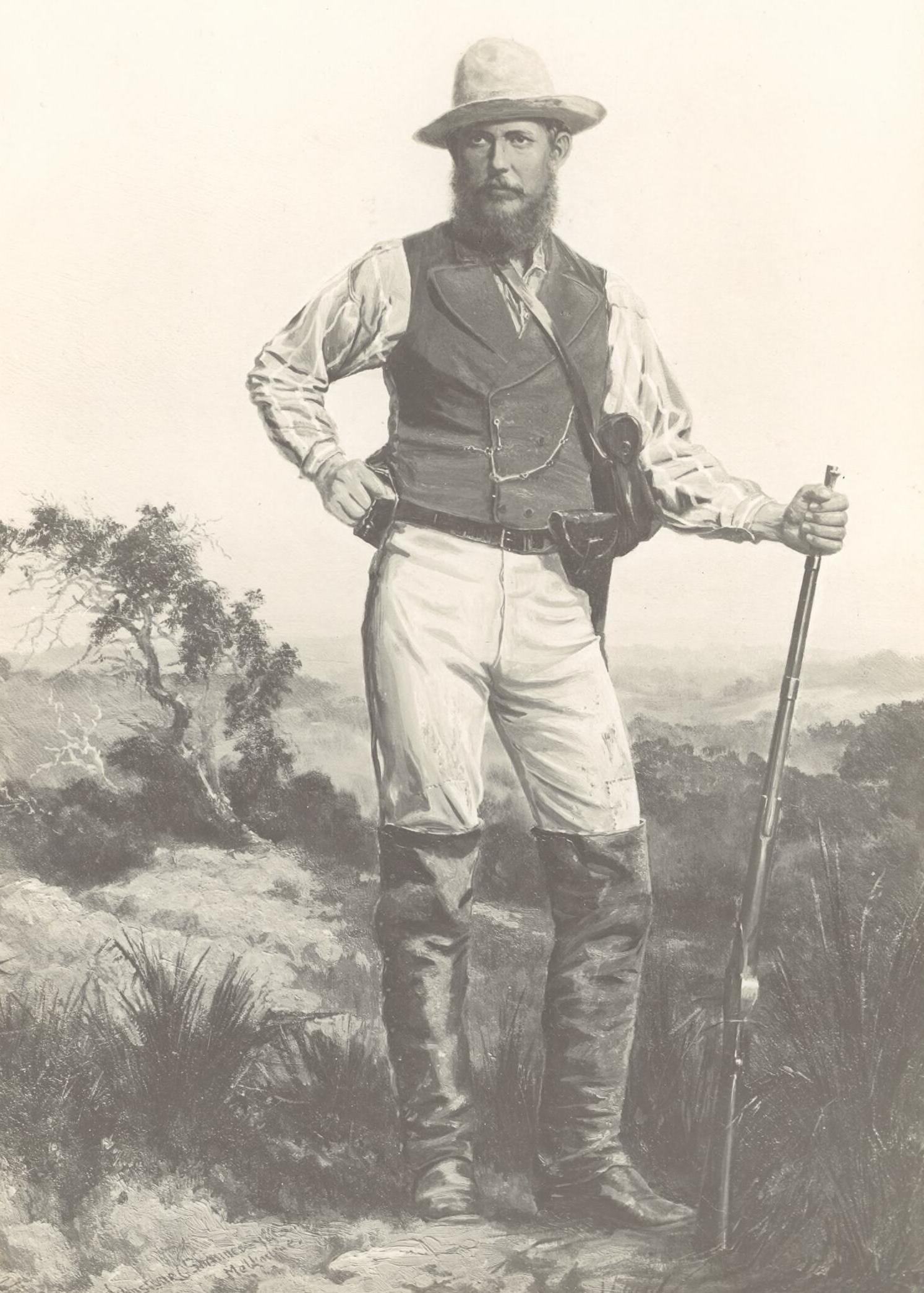
Forrest as portrayed by Talma & Co. in 1874

Later that year, Forrest was selected to lead an expedition that would survey a land route along the Great Australian Bight between the colonies of South Australia and Western Australia. Eyre had achieved such a crossing 30 years earlier, but his expedition had been poorly planned and equipped, and Eyre had nearly perished from lack of water. Forrest's expedition would follow Eyre's route, but it would be thoroughly planned and properly resourced. Also, the recent discovery of safe anchorages at Israelite Bay and Eucla would permit Forrest's team to be reprovisioned along the way by a chartered schooner Adur. Forrest's brief was to provide a proper survey of the route, which might be used in future to establish a telegraph link between the colonies and also to assess the suitability of the land for pasture.

Forrest's team consisted of six men his brother Alexander was second in charge, Police constable Hector Neil McLarty, farrier William Osborn, trackers Tommy Windich and Billy Noongale (Kickett); 15 horses. The party left Perth on 30 March 1870, and arrived at Esperance on 24 April. Heavy rain fell for much of this time.

After resting and reprovisioning, the party left Esperance on 9 May and arrived at Israelite Bay nine days later. They had encountered very little feed for their horses and no permanent water, but they managed to obtain sufficient rain water from rock water-holes. After reprovisioning, the team left for Eucla on 30 May. Again, they encountered very little feed and no permanent water, and this time the water they obtained from rock water-holes was not sufficient. They were compelled to dash more than 240 kilometres (150 mi) to a spot that Eyre had found water in 1841. Having secured a water source, they rested and explored the area before moving on, eventually reaching Eucla on 2 July. At Eucla, they rested and reprovisioned and explored inland, where they found good pasture land. On 14 July, the team started the final leg of their expedition through unsettled country: from Eucla to the nearest South Australian station. During the last leg, almost no water could be found, and the team were compelled to travel day and night for nearly five days. They saw their first signs of civilisation on 18 July and eventually reached Adelaide on 27 August.

A week later, they boarded ship for Western Australia, arriving in Perth on 27 September. They were honoured at two receptions: one by the Perth City Council and a citizens' banquet at the Horse and Groom Tavern. Speaking at the receptions, Forrest was modest about his own contributions, but praised the efforts of the members of the expedition and divided a government gratuity between them.

Forrest's bight crossing was one of the most organised and best managed expeditions of his time. As a result, his party successfully completed in five months a journey that had taken Eyre twelve and arrived in good health and without the loss of a single horse. From that point of view, the expedition must be considered a success.

However, the tangible results were not great. They had not travelled far from Eyre's track, and although a large area was surveyed, only one small area of land suitable for pasture was found. A second expedition by the same team returned to the area between August and November 1871 and found further good pastures, north-north-east of Esperance.

=== Across interior ===
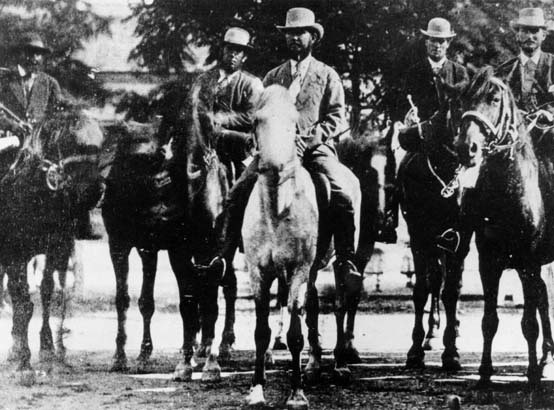
Forrest leading his 1874 expedition party out of Perth

In August 1872, Forrest was invited to lead a third expedition, from Geraldton to the source of the Murchison River and then east through the uncharted centre of Western Australia to the overland telegraph line from Darwin to Adelaide. The purpose was to discover the nature of the unknown centre of Western Australia, and to find new pastoral land.

Forrest's team again consisted of six men, including his brother Alexander and Windich. They also had 20 horses and food for eight months. The team left Geraldton on 1 April 1874, and a fortnight later, it passed through the colony's outermost station. On 3 May the team passed into unknown land. It found plenty of good pastoral land around the headwaters of the Murchison River, but by late May, it was travelling over arid land. On 2 June, while dangerously short of water, it discovered Weld Springs, "one of the best springs in the colony" according to Forrest. This later became Well 9 of the Canning Stock Route, but it proved unreliable as a water source.

At Weld Springs, the party came into conflict with a group of Martu people. In his diary, Forrest recorded that 40 to 60 men had appeared on the hill overlooking the springs, "all plumed up and armed with spears and shields". They then rushed towards the camp brandishing spears, to which Forrest and his party responded by firing their weapons. The group retreated up the hill before charging again, and more shots were fired. On the following day, Forrest found blood near the camp, speculating that two men had been shot and at least one had suffered a severe wound. Fearing another attack, Forrest and his men constructed a stone hut (or "fort") with a thatched roof, approximately 7 feet (2.1 m) high and 10 feet (3.0 m) by 9 feet (2.7 m) in area. There were no further confrontations between the groups. According to Martu oral history, the initial conflict occurred after one of the white men approached Martu singing around a fire and was threatened with a spear. The second incident occurred after the fort was built and resulted in some of their men being killed. It has been suggested that the expedition may have intruded upon a ceremonial gathering.

Beyond Weld Springs water was extremely hard to obtain, and by 4 July the team relied on occasional thunderstorms for water. By 2 August, the team was critically short of water; a number of horses had been abandoned, and Forrest's journal indicates that the team had little confidence of survival. A few days later, it was rescued by a shower of rain. On 23 August, it was again critically short of water and half of their horses were near death, when they were saved by the discovery of Elder Springs.

Then, the land became somewhat less arid, and the risk of dying from thirst started to abate. Other difficulties continued, however: the team had to abandon more of their horses, and one member of the team suffered from scurvy and could barely walk. The team finally sighted the telegraph line near Mount Alexander on 27 September and reached Peake Telegraph Station three days later. The remainder of the journey was a succession of triumphant public receptions by passing through each country town en route to Adelaide. The team reached Adelaide on 3 November 1874, more than six months after they started from Geraldton.

From an exploration point of view, Forrest's third expedition was of great importance. A large area of previously unknown land was explored, and the popular notion of an inland sea was shown to be unlikely. However, the practical results were not great. Plenty of good pastoral land was found up to the head of the Murchison, but beyond that, the land was useless for pastoral enterprise, and Forrest was convinced that it would never be settled. During the expedition Forrest collected botanical specimens that were given to Ferdinand von Mueller, who, in turn, named Eremophila forrestii in his honour.

In 1875, Forrest published Explorations in Australia, an account of his three expeditions. In July 1876, he was awarded the Patron's Medal of the Royal Geographical Society of London. He was made a CMG by Queen Victoria in 1882 for his services in exploring the interior.

== Colonial politics ==
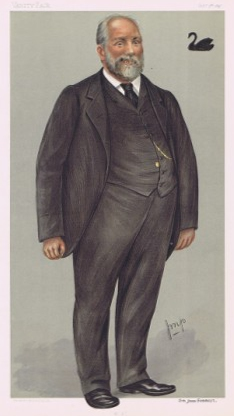
Forrest caricatured by Julius Mendes Price for Vanity Fair, 1897

Forrest was an outstanding surveyor, and his successful expeditions had made him a popular public figure as well. Consequently, he was promoted rapidly through the ranks of the Lands and Surveys Department, and in January 1883 he succeeded Malcolm Fraser in the positions of surveyor-general and commissioner of crown lands. This was one of the most powerful and responsible positions in the colony, and it accorded him a seat on the colony's Executive Council. At the same time, Forrest was nominated to the colony's Legislative Council.

== Premier (1890–1901) ==
After Britain ceded to Western Australia the right to self-rule in 1890, Forrest was elected unopposed to the seat of Bunbury in the Legislative Assembly. On 22 December 1890, Governor William Robinson appointed Forrest the first Premier of Western Australia. In May of the following year, he was knighted KCMG for his services to the colony.

=== Programme ===
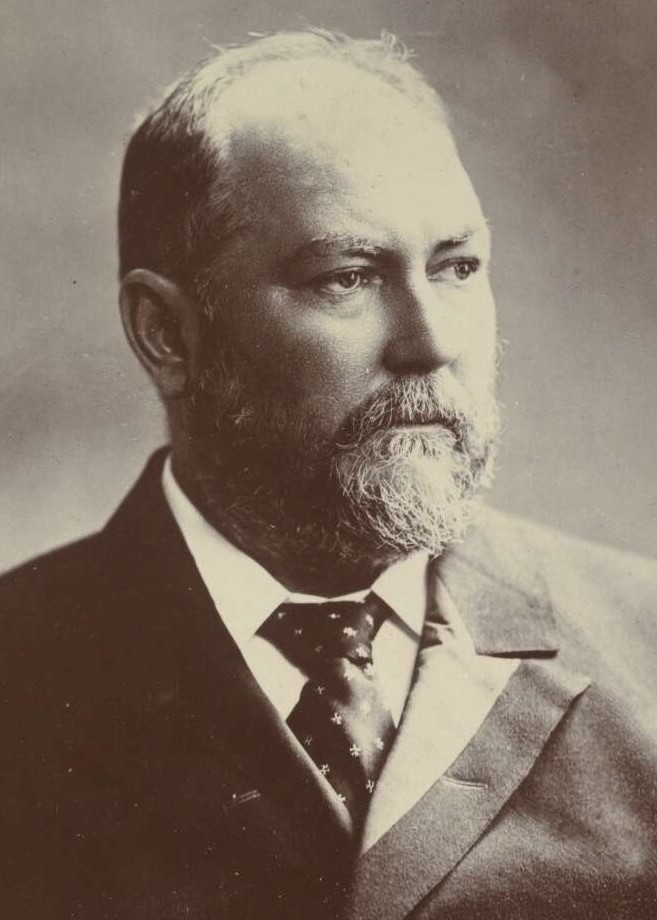
Forrest in 1898

The Forrest Ministry immediately embarked on a programme of large-scale public works funded by loans raised in London. Public works were greatly in demand at the time, because of the British government's reluctance to approve public spending in the colony. Under the direction of the brilliant engineer C. Y. O'Connor, many thousands of miles of railway were laid, and many bridges, jetties, lighthouses and town halls were constructed. The two most ambitious projects were the Fremantle Harbour Works, one of the few public works of the 1890s which is still in use today; and the Goldfields Water Supply Scheme, one of the greatest engineering feats of its time, in which the Helena River was dammed and the water piped over 550 kilometres (340 mi) to Kalgoorlie. Forrest's public works programme was generally well received, although on the Eastern Goldfields where the rate of population growth and geographical expansion far outstripped the government's ability to provide works, Forrest was criticised for not doing enough. He invited further criticism in 1893 with his infamous "spoils to the victors" speech, in which he appeared to assert that members who opposed the government were putting at risk their constituents' access to their fair share of public works.

Forrest's government also implemented a number of social reforms, including measures to improve the status of women, young girls and wage-earners. However, although Forrest did not always oppose proposals for social reform, he never instigated or championed them. Critics have therefore argued that Forrest deserves little credit for the social reforms achieved under his premiership. On political reform, however, Forrest's influence was unquestionable. In 1893, Forrest guided through parliament a number of significant amendments to the Constitution of Western Australia, including an extension of the franchise to all men regardless of property ownership. He also had a significant role in repealing section 70 of that constitution, which had provided that 1% of public revenue should be paid to a Board (not under local political control) for the welfare of Indigenous people, and was "widely hated" by the colonists.

=== Federation ===
The major political question of the time, though, was federation. Forrest was in favour of federation, and felt that it was inevitable, but he also felt that Western Australia should not join until it obtained fair terms. He was heavily involved in the framing of the Australian Constitution, representing Western Australia at a number of meetings on federation, including the National Australasian Convention of 1891, and the Australasian Federal Convention of 1897–8. There he opposed the transfer of postal and telegraphic services to the projected Commonwealth as an "absurdity", and declared only a "lunatic" would want the federal capital located in the interior of the country. He fought hard to protect the rights of the less populous states, arguing for a strong upper house organised along state lines. He also pressed for a number of concessions to Western Australia, managing to secure the phasing out of Western Australian tariffs instead of their immediate abolition, but failing to secure the construction of a trans-Australian railway.

The proposed federation was unpopular with the section of society Forrest represented. Only two of this 30 or so supporters in parliament, he said, favoured it. And 62 percent of voters in his electorate of Bunbury were to vote No when the question was put to them by referendum. But support on the goldfields was overwhelming, and by May 1900 it was apparent his efforts could not obtain better terms. Forrest decided on a referendum, a large majority of Western Australians voted to join the federation, and in 1901 Western Australia was an "original state" of the new Commonwealth of Australia.

== Federal politics ==
=== First federal ministry under Barton ===
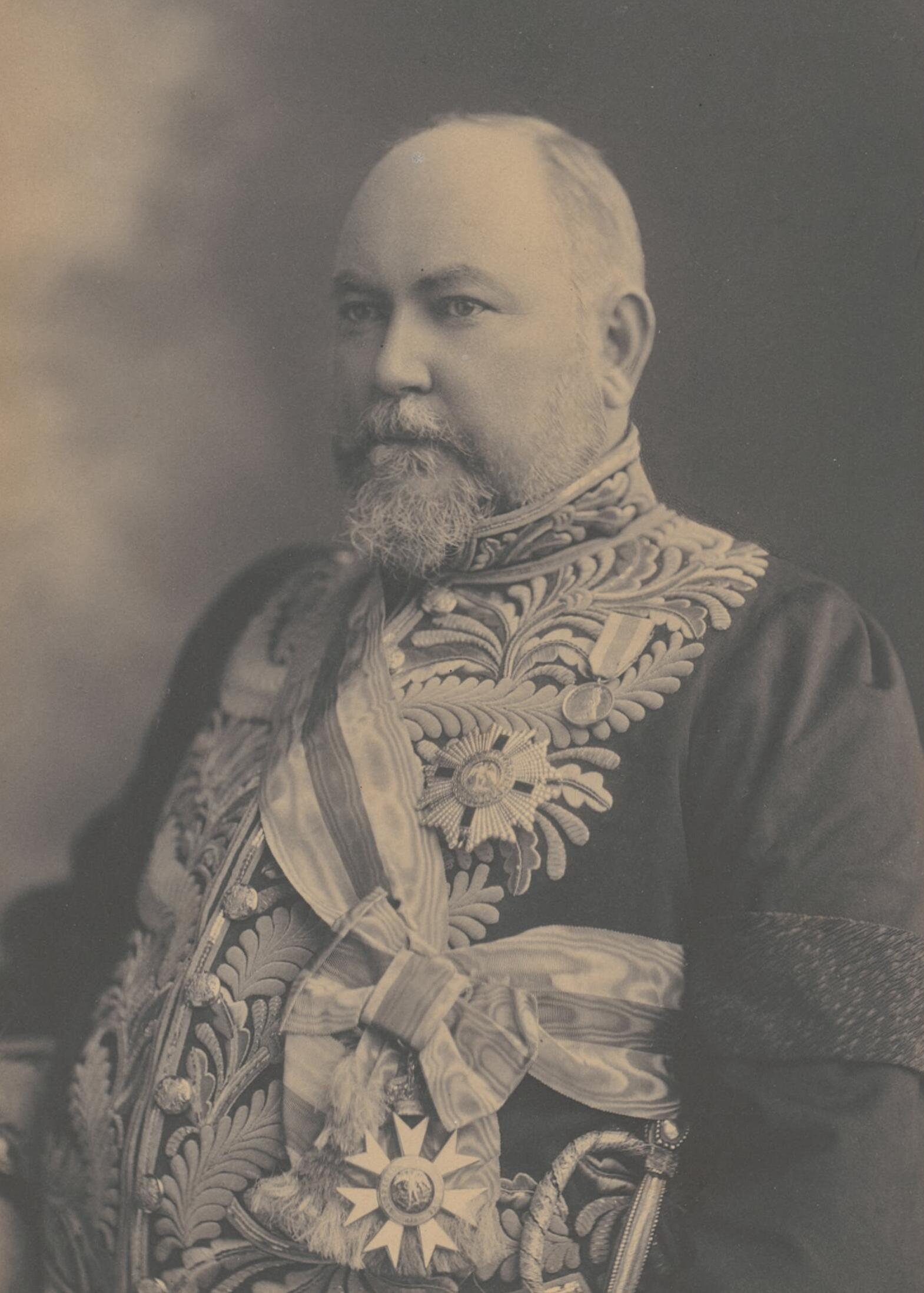
Forrest in the court uniform of a privy counsellor in 1901. He wears a black armband on the occasion of the death of Queen Victoria alongside the star and riband of the Order of St Michael and St George and the Queen Victoria Diamond Jubilee Medal.

On 30 December 1900, Forrest accepted the position of Postmaster-General in Edmund Barton's federal caretaker government. Two days later, he received news that he had been made a GCMG "in recognition of services in connection with the Federation of Australian Colonies and the establishment of the Commonwealth of Australia". Forrest was postmaster-general for only 17 days: he resigned to take up the defence portfolio, which had been made vacant by the death of Sir James Dickson. On 13 February 1901, he resigned as premier of Western Australia and as member for Bunbury.

In the March 1901 federal election, the first one ever, Forrest was elected, unopposed, on a moderate Protectionist platform to the federal House of Representatives seat of Swan. He held the defence portfolio for over two years. After a cabinet reshuffle on 7 August 1903, he became Minister for Home Affairs. In that portfolio, he resolutely pressed the ill-starred project to site the national capital at Dalgety, despite having previously dismissed any location within Australia's interior as lunacy.

=== Deakin governments ===
The December 1903 federal election greatly weakened the governing party. Shortly afterwards, it was defeated and replaced by a Labour government under Chris Watson. Forrest moved to the crossbenches, where he was a scathing critic of the Labour government's policies and legislation. After George Reid's Free Trade Party took office in August 1904, he remained on the crossbenches but largely supported the government.

Throughout the process to select Australia's national capital site, Forrest was a firm supporter of Dalgety.

In June 1905, Alfred Deakin's Protectionist Party formed an alliance with Labour to end Reid's government. They formed a new government on 7 July, with Forrest appointed Treasurer, as fifth in seniority. After a ministerial reshuffle in October 1906, Forrest became third in cabinet precedence. He served as acting prime minister from 18 to 26 June 1907, as both Deakin and Lyne were in London attending imperial conferences.

The alliance with Labour had put Forrest in a difficult position, as he had repeatedly opposed it. Before the December 1906 federal election, he continued to attack the Labour Party despite sharing government with it and depending on its support. In the following months, Forrest was himself heavily criticised in the press for his willingness to work with the Labour Party when Cabinet was in session and for his attacks on the party during election campaigns.

He began to feel that his reputation in Western Australia and his personal standing in cabinet were being undermined. In response, he resigned as treasurer on 30 July 1907 and joined the crossbenches, where he was a mild critic of the government.

A few months later, Labour withdrew its support for Deakin's government, forcing it to resign. Labour then formed government under Andrew Fisher. In the following months, Forrest and a number of other members worked to arrange a fusion of the Free Trade and Protectionist parties into a single party. Eventually, the Commonwealth Liberal Party was formed, with Deakin as leader. Fisher was then forced to resign, and the new Liberal Party took office on 2 June 1909, with Forrest as treasurer. Labour reclaimed office at the April 1910 federal election.

=== 1910s ===
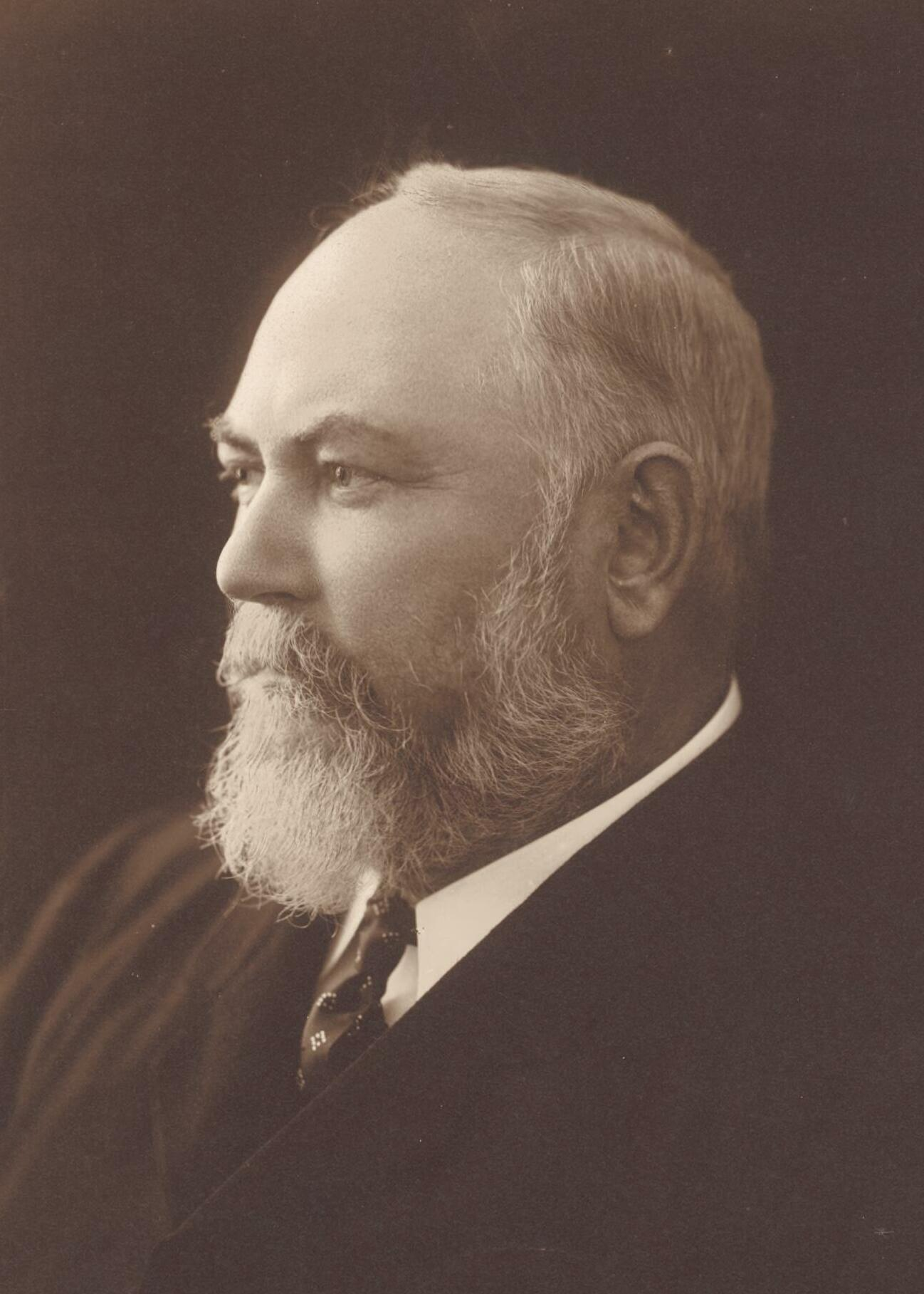
Portrait by Lafayette Studios

Early in 1913, Deakin resigned as Leader of the Opposition. Forrest and Joseph Cook contested the leadership, with Cook winning by a single vote. Forrest was very disappointed, especially since Deakin, whom he considered a friend, had voted against him. Five months later, in the May 1913 federal election, the Liberal Party returned to power, with Cook as Prime Minister. Forrest was appointed treasurer for the third time. However, the government's majority of just one seat in the House of Representatives, along with Labor's large majority in the Senate, made it difficult to get anything done. In June 1914, Cook asked the Governor-General for a double dissolution, and Australia was sent back to the polls. Forrest retained his seat, but the Liberal Party was soundly defeated and Forrest was again relegated to the crossbenches.

In December 1916, a split in the Labor Party over conscription left Prime Minister Billy Hughes with a minority government. Hughes and his colleagues formed the National Labor Party, and the Liberal Party joined with it in the formation of a new government. For the fourth time, Forrest was appointed treasurer. The National Labor and Liberal parties easily won a combined majority at the May 1917 election, and the two parties soon merged to form the Nationalist Party of Australia.

On 20 December, a referendum on conscription was defeated, and Hughes kept his promise to resign as prime minister if the referendum was lost. Forrest immediately declared himself a candidate for the position, but the Governor-General found that Forrest did not have the numbers and so asked Hughes to form government again. Hughes accepted, and the previous government was again sworn in.

== Illness, peerage and death ==
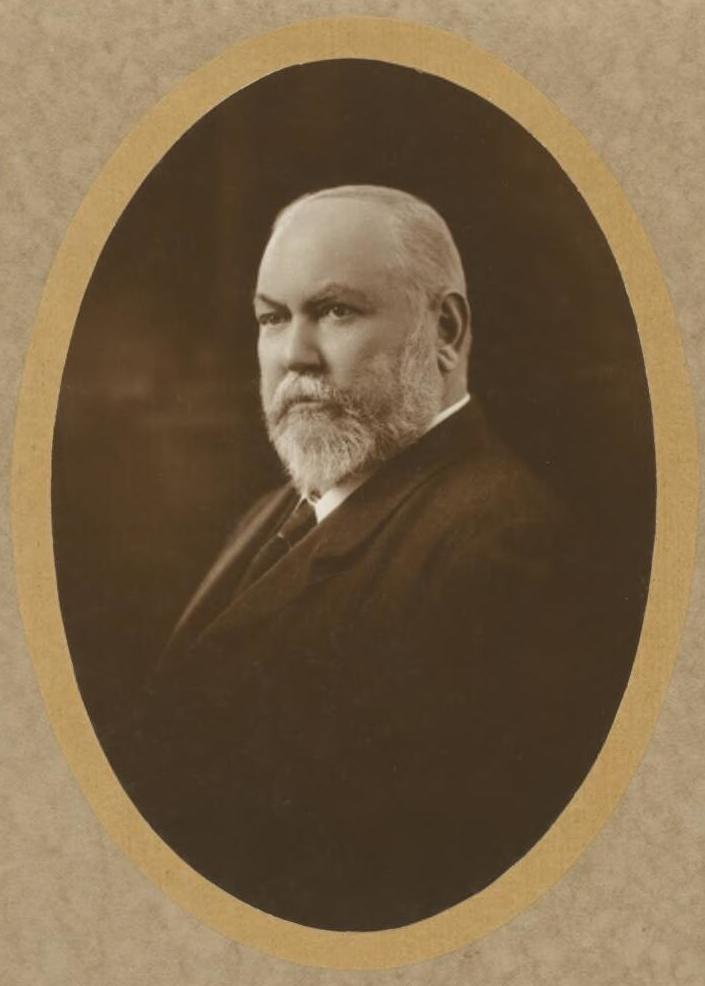
Portrait of Forrest by Broothorn Studios

Forrest had a rodent ulcer removed from his left temple in January 1915, which was initially thought to be non-malignant. Another operation followed in Perth in March 1917, but the cancer returned. He had a third operation in January 1918, after which he was hospitalised for nearly two weeks. The surgeons buried radium in the wound in that hopes that it would help prevent a recurrence. Forrest spent a month recuperating in Healesville; on a visit to the Melbourne Club during this time he was found to weigh 17 stone (110 kg). He resigned from the ministry on 21 March 1918, on the advice of his doctors. William Watt had been acting as treasurer in his absence and was appointed as his replacement.

On 7 February 1918, Forrest was informed by the Governor-General that he would be raised to the Peerage of the United Kingdom as 1st Baron Forrest of Bunbury. The honour was granted on the advice of Hughes, who was aware that it would signal the end of Forrest's political career. It had been suggested to Hughes two years earlier by John Langdon Bonython. Forrest would have been the first Australian peer, and the announcement was received critically from those opposed to the granting of hereditary honours, including many of Hughes' former ALP colleagues. However, Forrest's peerage was never formalised, as no letters patent were issued before his death and it became a Ghost Barony. His barony is not listed in The Complete Peerage.

Faced with declining health, Forrest decided to travel to London to seek assistance from specialists in London, accompanied by his wife and a nurse. Before he left he revised his will and made arrangements for his burial. He also hoped to take his seat in the House of Lords if his health permitted. Forrest left Albany aboard the troopship Marathon on 30 July 1918. He spent two nights in a private hospital when the ship stopped in Durban, South Africa, but returned to the ship and celebrated his 71st birthday on 22 August "in considerable pain". He died at sea on 2 September 1918, three hours away from Freetown, Sierra Leone.

Forrest was initially interred at the military cemetery in Freetown. His body was brought back to Western Australia and buried at Karrakatta Cemetery on 7 May 1919. His death occasioned the 1918 Swan by-election, which saw the 22-year-old ALP candidate Edwin Corboy become Australia's youngest member of parliament, a record not broken until 2010.

== Character ==
He was a tall, heavily built man; in his later years, he tended towards stoutness, and he had a mass of about 120 kg (260 lb) when he died. He was fond of pomp and ceremony and insisted on being treated with respect at all times. Highly sensitive to criticism, he hated having his authority challenged and tended to browbeat his political opponents. He had very little sense of humour and was greatly offended when a journalist playfully referred to him as the "Commissioner for Crown Sands".

His upbringing and education were said by his biographer, F. K. Crowley, to have installed in him "a heady compound of social snobbery, laissez-faire capitalism, sentimental royalism, patriotic Anglicanism, benevolent imperialism and racial superiority". He was, however, a very popular figure who treated everyone he met with politeness and dignity. He was renowned for his memory for names and faces and for his prolific letter-writing.

However, as reported in The Ballarat Star on 12 July 1907, Forrest defended the use of neckchains to restrain enslaved indigenous captives, saying "Chaining aborigines by the neck is the only effective way of preventing their escape."

=== Racial views ===
Forrest took a paternalistic and patronising attitude toward Indigenous Australians. He supported assimilation policies, and his views were considered liberal by contemporary Western Australian standards. In 1883, in one of his first speeches to parliament, he referred to Aboriginal people being "hunted like dogs" and said they were owed "something more than repression". In the same speech he stated that they should not be punished too severely as they were "to a great extent like children". He further described Aboriginal people in an 1892 address to the National History Society as "in the same category as Marsupialia in having a very low degree of intelligence", but was impressed with their complex traditions and hoped they would be recorded before the race "died out". In 1890, he submitted an anthropological paper on marriage in north-west Australia to the Australasian Association for the Advancement of Science, along with "a brief appeal to preserve the Aboriginal race and its culture from extinction".

A study by Elizabeth Goddard and Tom Stannage of Forrest's public statements on Aboriginal people concluded that he was "locked into and promoted an ideology of development which had racism at its heart". In 1886, as surveyor-general, he introduced the Aborigines Protection Act 1886 into the Legislative Council, which provided for an Aborigines Protection Board. He was appointed to the board in 1890, by which time it had been given a fixed percentage of the colony's annual revenue in the newly granted constitution. Forrest was strongly opposed to the financial provisions and after becoming premier sought to amend the constitution to remove them. He spent several years lobbying the British government for approval, which was eventually granted in 1897 and saw Aboriginal affairs return to the control of the colonial government. According to Martyn Webb, he was capable of compassion towards Aboriginal people, but "it would be wrong to imagine that Forrest was some sort of unrequited idealist as far as Aborigines were concerned" and "his views about Aboriginal people as a whole were not entirely different from those of his time".

As premier, Forrest faced pressure from pastoralists in the north-west – including family members and parliamentary colleagues – to intervene on their behalf in frontier conflicts, simultaneously facing pressure to intervene in cases of cruelty and mistreatment toward Aboriginal people. In 1893, on the topic of massacres, he stated that "I must not, in the position I am in, do anything or sanction anything that will lead to the impression that an indiscriminate slaughter of blackfellows will be tolerated or allowed by the government of the colony". In 1889 he had persuaded the Executive Council to commute a death sentence imposed on an Aboriginal man in Roebourne, who had been convicted of murder for a killing under customary law. Forrest's government nevertheless introduced harsher penalties for Aboriginal people caught stealing or killing livestock, including flogging and imprisonment. It also continued the use of Rottnest Island as a prison for Aboriginal offenders, despite his earlier criticism of the practice of taking them away from their home country. In 1905 he defended the use of neck chains for Aboriginal prisoners, stating that were necessary to prevent escape.

According to historian Henry Reynolds, Forrest ignored the Aboriginal rights embodied in pastoral leases, and presided over the parliament for the decade that "also witnessed the violent suppression of Aboriginal resistance in the Kimberley... [where] the Forrest family, including John's brother Alexander, were deeply involved in the whole venture as leaseholders, managers and financiers". By the mid-1890s, police were eradicating Aboriginal people from pastoral land, with the full knowledge of the government.

== Honours ==
- In May 1876, Forrest was made a Knight of the Order of the Crown of Italy by King Victor Emmanuel II.
- In the 1882 Birthday Honours, Forrest was made a Companion of the Order of St Michael and St George (CMG).
- In the 1891 Birthday Honours, Forrest was knighted as a Knight Commander of the Order of St Michael and St George (KCMG).
- In the 1897 Diamond Jubilee Honours, Forrest was appointed by Queen Victoria as a member of Her Majesty's Most Honourable Privy Council, entitling him to be styled as "The Right Honourable". He was sworn-in as a privy councillor by The Queen on 7 July 1897 at Windsor Castle.
- Queen Victoria Diamond Jubilee Medal (1898).
- In the 1901 New Year Honours, Forrest was made a Knight Grand Cross of the Order of St Michael and St George (GCMG).
- King Edward VII Coronation Medal (1902)
- King George V Coronation Medal (1911)

=== Arms ===
Coat of arms of Sir John Forrest
Crest On a wreath of the colours, a cubit arm erect vested azure, cuffed argent, the hand proper, holding a cross botonny fitcheé in bend sinister of the second. Helm A Knight's helm. Escutcheon Argent, on a mount, a forest of trees proper, on a chief azure, three stars of eight points on the first. Supporters On either side a lion azure, each charged on the shoulder with a mullet of eight points and holding in the fore-paw a cross botonny fitcheé in bend dexter and sinister argent. Compartment A mount vert Motto Latin: Vivunt dum virent (They live while green) Orders The Collar of the Order of St Michael and St George Other elements Mantling gules, doubled argent. Symbolism

== Legacy ==
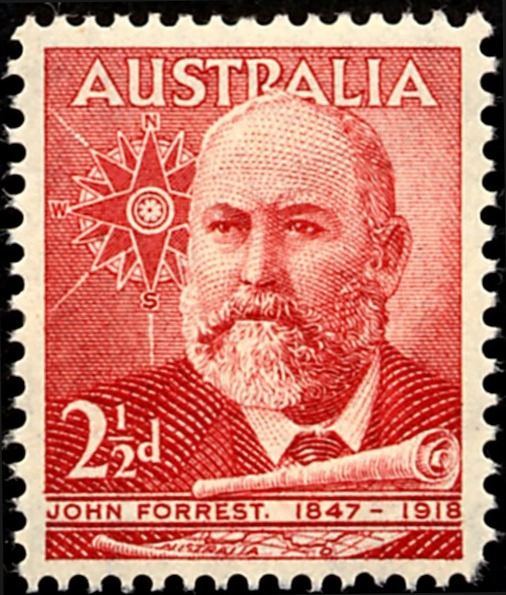
1949 postage stamp

Forrest's legacy can be found in the Western Australian landscape, with many places named by or after him:

- the small settlement of Forrest on the Trans-Australian Railway;
- Glen Forrest;
- Forrestdale;
- John Forrest National Park;
- Forrest River;
- Forrest Chase;
- Forrestfield and
- John Forrest Secondary College in Morley.

In addition, the electoral Division of Forrest was created in 1922; the suburb of Forrest, Australian Capital Territory is named after Forrest, as one of the many suburbs of Canberra named after Australia's first federal politicians.

The Forrest Highway, opened in September 2009, was named after him. The Eyre Highway was first known as the Forrest Highway, when it was first established as an unsealed road in 1942.

He is one of many railroad builders featured as a possible computer-controlled competitor in the simulation game Railroad Tycoon 3.

On 28 November 1949, the Australian post office issued a commemorative stamp that featured Forrest.

The Lord Forrest Hotel opened in Bunbury in 1986 even though he was never correctly known by that name. It is still running today and proudly displays his pictures on the walls. It is the largest hotel in Bunbury.

== Notes ==
Western Australian Legislative Assembly
New district	Member for Bunbury; 1890–1901	Succeeded by Thomas Hayward
Political offices
New title	Premier of Western Australia; 1890–1901	Succeeded by George Throssell
Preceded by Anthony O'Grady Lefroy	Colonial Treasurer; 1890–1901	Succeeded by George Throssell
Parliament of Australia
New division	Member for Swan; 1901–1918	Succeeded by Edwin Corboy
Political offices
New title	Postmaster-General; 1901	Succeeded by James Drake
Preceded by James Dickson	Minister for Defence; 1901–1903	Succeeded by James Drake
Preceded by William Lyne	Minister for Home Affairs; 1903–1904	Succeeded by Lee Batchelor
Preceded by Sir George Turner	Treasurer; 1905–1907	Succeeded by Sir William Lyne
Preceded by Andrew Fisher	Treasurer; 1909–1910	Succeeded by Andrew Fisher
Preceded by Andrew Fisher	Treasurer; 1913–1914	Succeeded by Andrew Fisher
Preceded by Alexander Poynton	Treasurer; 1917–1918	Succeeded by William Watt
