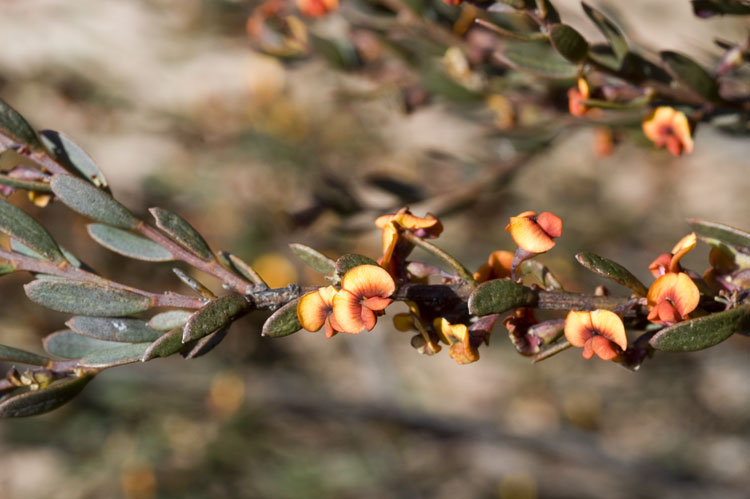
- In the Fitzgerald River National Park

Scientific classification
- Kingdom: Plantae
- Clade: Tracheophytes
- Clade: Angiosperms
- Clade: Eudicots
- Clade: Rosids
- Order: Fabales
- Family: Fabaceae
- Subfamily: Faboideae
- Genus: Daviesia
- Species: D. argillacea

Binomial name
- Daviesia argillacea Crisp

Synonyms
- Daviesia obtusifolia var. parvifolia E.Pritz.; Daviesia phyllodinea var. parvifolia S.Moore

= Daviesia argillacea =

Species of flowering plant

Daviesia argillacea is a species of flowering plant in the family Fabaceae and is endemic to the south-west of Western Australia. It is an erect, bushy shrub with erect narrow egg-shaped phyllodes with the narrower end towards the base, and yellow to orange and maroon flowers.

== Description ==
Daviesia argillacea is an erect, bushy, mostly glabrous shrub that typically grows to a height of 2 m (6 ft 7 in) or higher. Its leaves are reduced to erect, usually narrow egg-shaped phyllodes with the narrower end towards the base, 7–22 mm (0.28–0.87 in) wide and 3–6 mm (0.12–0.24 in) wide. The flowers are arranged singly or in pairs in leaf axils on a peduncle 0.25–2 mm (0.0098–0.0787 in) long, each flower on a pedicel 1.0–2.5 mm (0.039–0.098 in) long with spatula-shaped bracts at the base. The sepals are 3.5–4.0 mm (0.14–0.16 in) long, the two upper joined in a broad "lip" and the lower three smaller and triangular. The standard petal is orange or orange-yellow with a dull red or maroon base and 4.5–5.0 mm (0.18–0.20 in) long, the wings orange with a maroon tinge and about 4.5 mm (0.18 in) long and the keel maroon and about 4 mm (0.16 in) long. Flowering occurs from July to October and the fruit is a flattened triangular pod 5–7 mm (0.20–0.28 in) long.

== Taxonomy and naming ==
Daviesia argillacea was first formally described in 1995 by Michael Crisp in Australian Systematic Botany from specimens he collected south of Norseman in 1979. The specific epithet (argillacea) means "resembling white clay", referring to the soil in which this species grows.

== Distribution and habitat ==
This species of pea mainly grows in woodland or mallee shrubland in the area between Southern Cross, the Pallinup River, Cape Arid National Park and Lake Lefroy in the Avon Wheatbelt, Coolgardie, Esperance Plains and Mallee biogeographic regions in the south-west of Western Australia.

== Conservation status ==
Daviesia apiculata is classified as "not threatened" by the Government of Western Australia Department of Biodiversity, Conservation and Attractions.
