= Burbanks, Western Australia =

Abandoned town in Western Australia

Burbanks
- Town
- Coordinates: 31.034°S 121.135°E
- Country: Australia
- State: Western Australia
- LGA: Shire of Coolgardie
- Location: 567 km (352 mi) ENE of Perth; 9 km (5.6 mi) south of Coolgardie
- Established: 1897

Government
  - State electorate: Eyre
  - Federal division: O'Connor
- Elevation: 408 m (1,339 ft)
- Postcode: 6429

Burbanks is an abandoned town in Western Australia located between Coolgardie and Londonderry in the Goldfields-Esperance region of Western Australia.

In 1894 gold was discovered in the area and the townsite was gazetted in 1897. The following year the population of the town was 390 (350 males and 40 females).

The town was named after the prospector, John Burbanks in 1893, who along with his partner Sheldon, first discovered gold in the area. The find was named the Birthday Gift and a company was swiftly formed which bought a sixty head battery.

The Burbanks Gold Mine continues to operate near the old town site.
