= Widgiemooltha, Western Australia =

Abandoned town in Western Australia

Widgiemooltha
- Town
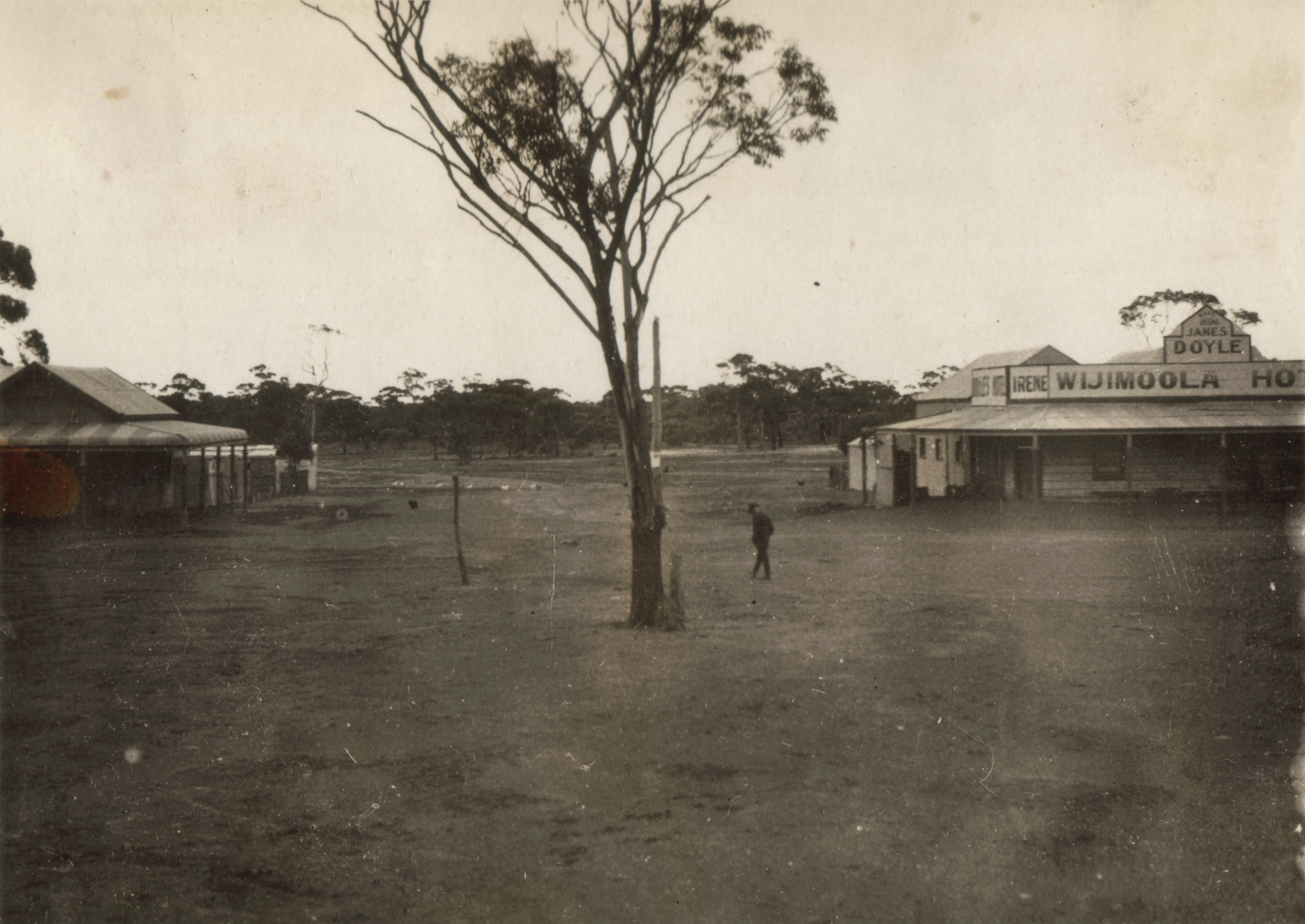
- Widgiemooltha in 1930

- Interactive map of Widgiemooltha
- Coordinates: 31.50°S 121.58°E
- Country: Australia
- State: Western Australia
- LGA: Shire of Coolgardie
- Location: 631 km (392 mi) east of Perth; 41 km (25 mi) south of Kambalda
- Established: 1897

Government
  - State electorate: Eyre
  - Federal division: O'Connor

Area
  - Total: 5,942.9 km^{2} (2,294.6 sq mi)
- Elevation: 374 m (1,227 ft)

Population
  - Total: 28 (SAL 2021)
- Postcode: 6443

Widgiemooltha is an abandoned town in Western Australia 631 kilometres (392 mi) east of Perth, Western Australia between Kambalda and Norseman in the Goldfields-Esperance region of Western Australia. It is found on the southern shoreline of Lake Lefroy.

The location of the original townsite is on Kingswood Street, which runs at the rear of the Widgiemooltha Roadhouse. The Coolgardie-Esperance Hwy now bypasses the original townsite. In August 2015, the only evidence of the original township was the remains of the hotel.

In the 1890s gold was discovered in the area and the townsite was gazetted in 1897 as Widgemooltha, the spelling being amended to the current form in 1944. It had also been referred to as Widgiemoultha. In 1898 the town had a population of 112 (100 males and 12 females). The name of the town is Aboriginal in origin and is thought to be the name of a nearby hill and rock-hole. It is thought to be related to the beak of an emu.

The goldfields around the area were home to the Golden Eagle nugget, which was found in 1931 by Jim Larcombe. It weighed 1,136 ounces (32.2 kg), the biggest nugget found in the history of Western Australian goldfields. The find sparked a gold fever and shortly afterward 1,000 men were working the field unearthing other reefs and nuggets.

In 1956, Widgiemooltha had a small population. These included railway fettlers and their families (there were 4 fettler families, complete with children), Listers' Salt Works (now WA Salt Supply) employees, a schoolteacher, a shopkeeper and a few hotel staff.

Gold and nickel continue to be mined in the area.

== See also ==
- Widgiemooltha Komatiite
