= Hector Neil McLarty =

Australian police officer and customs detective

Hector Neil McLarty (15 March 1851 – 24 November 1912) was a Western Australian Police officer and customs detective. During his service as a police officer he accompanied future Premier John Forrest on two expeditions and was in charge of the officers attempting to capture the Fenian escapees on the Catalpa.

== Personal life ==
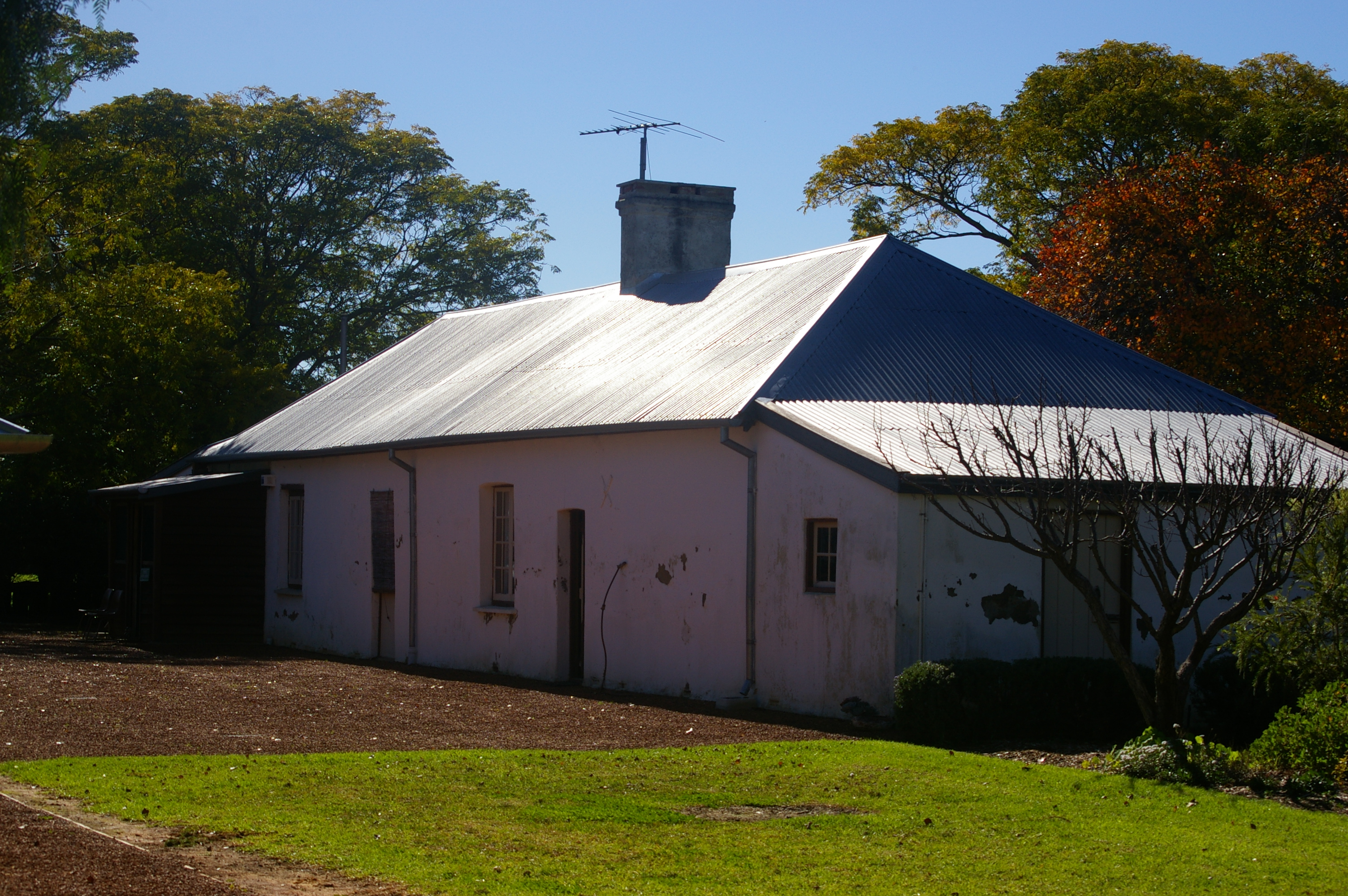
Original homestead c1845, became staff quarters, kitchen, and storage when the new homestead was completed during 1851

McLarty married Elizabeth Campbell in March 1875. They had six children: three boys and three girls. The eldest, Campbell McLarty, was one of the pastrolists to open up the north west of Western Australia for graziers. Roy McLarty received the Military Medal at Gallipoli and went on to become the Chief Executive for the AMP Society. His youngest son, Duncan Keith, was killed in action on 25 September 1915 during the Battle of Loos.

The youngest of his daughters, Muriel Eileen McLarty, was the oldest surviving McLarty to attend the National Trust of Australia official opening of Old Blythewood homestead near Pinjarra by Governor Wallace Kyle. Old Blythewood was built by Hector McLarty's father John in 1851 and was given to the National Trust by the McLarty family in 1974.

== Police Officer ==
Hector McLarty joined the Western Australian Police in June 1868 at the age of 17 years. In March 1870, as a police constable, he was part of John Forrest's expedition to survey a route for the first overland telegraph. The expedition plan was to start at Esperance tracing the route of John Eyre's previous crossing from Adelaide, South Australia to Esperance. They arrived at the Dempster farm in Esperance in April to replenish before commencing the successful expedition, returning from Adelaide by steamship in September 1870. Between August and November 1871 the same expedition party returned to Esperance explore pastoral land they had identified north-northeast of Esperance during the first expedition.

McLarty was promoted to sergeant on 25 May 1874 while assigned to Perth's central police station. On 17 April 1876 McLarty led a group of 8 men, 2 pensioner guards from Perth and 6 police constables from Fremantle, in pursuit of the six Fenian prisoners that had escaped from the Fremantle Prison. They boarded the Georgette in Perth and steamed out of the Swan river in search of the Catalpa. Unsuccessful, they returned that night to Fremantle to refuel. Recommencing the search the following day, they succeeded in finding the Catalpa, and firing a shot across at the vessel they ordered it to stop or they would sink it. The captain of the Catalpa pointed at the United States flag and indicated that they were in international waters and that such action would be an act of war. The Georgette then returned to Fremantle; in his report on the incident McLarty wrote of the frustration and humiliation of letting the Catapla sail away.

In 1883 McLarty moved to Albany, Western Australia. While there he sent a telegraph to Esperance instructing Lance Corporal Truslove to intercept suspected bushranger James Cody, who was accused of stealing two horses. When Truslove caught Cody he refused to stop; Truslove then shot Cody. Taking him to Dempster property in Esperance for treatment, and despite the aid of a doctor giving instructions via telegraph from Albany, Cody died ten days later. At the age of 33, Hector McLarty retired from the police force on 29 February 1884.

== Later career ==
Hector McLarty moved his family to the timber town of Canning Mills in the Darling Scarp. There he worked for the Western Australian Government Railways on the Eastern Railway, while his wife was the Postmistress for the town during the early 1890s. McLarty then took up a position as a detective with the Western Australian Customs on 1 July 1895. As part of the Federation of Australia the WA Customs service was amalgamated with similar services in the other States to form the Australian Customs Service, Hector remained with the ACS until he retired on 30 June 1911.
