= Henry Landor =

Welsh born doctor and Australian settler

Henry Landor (1815 – 6 January 1877) was the first medical superintendent of the Asylum For The Insane, London, Ontario, which was built to his specifications. He was one of those at the forefront in North America of the movement for moral treatment of mental patients. Earlier in life, he was a settler, farmer, physician, scientist, and explorer in Western Australia, and then he became a naval surgeon in South Africa.

== Early years ==
Henry Landor was born in 1815 in Anglesey in Wales. He was educated in Liverpool under the care of Dr Prince. He graduated in the session of 1835–36 from the Aldersgate School of Medicine in London, England, receiving a Silver Medal.

== Western Australia ==
Landor and his brothers Edward Wilson Landor, a lawyer, (Note: Edward was the author of a book about the colony called The Bushman, Life in a New Country, to which Henry contributed.) and George W Landor, arrived in the Colony of Western Australia on Advocate on 27 August 1841 together with their subsequent business partner Nathan Elias Knight. Landor was appointed a magistrate on 16 November 1841.

The Landors intended to build up a large flock of sheep over six or so years but discovered that squatting on Government land was not permitted and so Henry and George farmed in partnership with Nathan Elias Knight, leasing Balladong Farm from Rivett Henry Bland "at a high rent", a 1,600-hectare (4,000-acre) farm (Note: This farm was later purchased by the Parker family.) in York, and "wasted capital upon objects that could never bring in a good return". They also without permission let their sheep graze upon Crown lands "on the Dale" (Note: Beverley.) and the Hotham and advertised for sheep and cattle "on shares". George remained farming as one of the shepherds, Henry wanted to explore, while Edward tried to grow vegetables and practised law in Perth; they also obtained some financial assistance from their father.

Landor became concerned with the spread of disease among the Aboriginal people. It was his opinion that contact with white settlers had been the cause of the virulent diseases. He took it upon himself to gather as many Aboriginal people as he could to look after them properly, effectively residing among them, and he applied unsuccessfully for government money for a hospital, though received some funds for medical treatment. (Note: Landor was on the Medical Board and also assisted to raise funds for the Methodist Native School of John Smithies.)

Knight and Landor got Bland's corn-mill functioning and continued to farm Merino sheep on their property as Bland and Trimmer had done before. Landor and Knight won the York Agricultural Society's first prize for the best merino ram. Landor was involved in the early discussions on behalf of the Society with the Government with a view to bringing convicts to Western Australia.

In 1842, Henry Landor and Henry Maxwell Lefroy explored to the east of King George's Sound, taking with them to help translate, the 10 year old Aboriginal boy Cowits, who was living in the Landor household. They discovered a "very large tract of excellent land, well-watered and abounding with herbage".

Landor's partnership with Nathan Knight was dissolved on 2 September 1844.

In December 1844, Landor explored the Deep River and reported that the country he passed over was well adapted for sheep and stock grazing and well supplied with water and timber, including a "tree so high (63 paces to the first branch) that he could not look over it". (Note: The tree was apparently jarrah.) A storm came and Landor and his "servant" (Note: The servant was probably Cowits.) took shelter in the hollow of an old jarrah tree that was so large it could even hold the horses. For a while in 1845, Henry and George Landor tried to establish a residence on Newdegate Island at the mouth of the Nornalup Inlet with a plan to catch and salt fish for the Mauritius market, graze sheep and export timber. Henry succeeded in building two large boats from less than half of one tree and "he was well satisfied of the fitness of the timber for the purpose". (Note: Today, two circular stone fireplaces covered by undergrowth are all that remain of the Landors' venture.) On the nights of 28 and 29 August 1845, they discovered that local Aboriginal people had crossed over from the mainland and stolen a ton of potatoes. In a skirmish, Henry shot an Aboriginal person. Two months later, on 8 November 1845, Henry was preparing to leave Albany on the Paul James for South Australia.

== Medical career ==
In 1845, he took up a position as Government Surgeon to the British Naval Forces at Cape Coast Castle, Cape Town, South Africa. He developed malaria and had to return to England to convalesce, where he developed an interest in insanity.

== Caring for the insane ==
In 1850, he became the resident physician of the Higham Retreat in Norwich, England. In 1859 he became a member of the Royal College of Physicians of Edinburgh.

In the fall of 1860, he emigrated to Canada and settled in London, Ontario. He engaged in private general practice until 1868.

From 1868 to 1870, he was appointed medical superintendent of the Malden Lunatic Asylum in Amherstburg, and then in 1870 he became the first Medical Superintendent, Asylum For The Insane, London, Ontario, which was built to his specifications.

"With so many incurables", he wrote, "treatment is confined to taking care of comforts (including) good and nourishing food, clothing [the insane] well, and working with those who have the strength to work, exercising out of doors those who can walk." He believed in amusement and occupation "daily dances in the afternoon for an hour or two, music, stereoscopic views, etc and [the patients] spin, knit, and make all the socks and stockings used. Employment is the rule of treatment."

"The admirable order, discipline and working condition in which he left the institution bear ample testimony to the zeal and fidelity of his unremitting labors. He was a true, though unostentatious philanthropist. His constant aim appeared to be the good of his fellow creatures." Landor introduced the "cottage system" to North America. The cottages were small satellite buildings on asylum grounds which eased overcrowding and afforded greater freedom of activity to chronic, quiet patients.

Landor expressed resentment at the control exerted by Inspector John Woodburn Langmuir, who was responsible for Prisons and Public Charities, complaining in 1876 that the system had become "too unbearably military for endurance".

Landor died at the London Asylum for the Insane, Ontario, on 6 January 1877 "burdened by diabetes, depressed and disillusioned".

The London Daily Free Press described him as "a gentleman universally respected on account of his attainments, and independence and sincerity of character and those with whom he was on intimate friendship felt an affection for him which may be said to be rare".

== Academic work ==
Landor's publications or other academic work included:

- Observations on the physiology of the aborigines (1842), which were controversial.
- Experiments on the poisonous Blackadder Creek Plant (1842).
- A pamphlet entitled "The only way to stop the slave trade", c. 1850, which was favourably received by the public.
- "Insanity in Relation to the Law", a paper presented to the Association of Officers of Asylums for the Insane in the United States and Canada (1871).
- "Hysteria in Children as Contrasted with Mania", published in London, Ontario (1873).
- Observations on ground-ice as a carrier of stones and debris.

== Personal life ==
His cousin was Walter Savage Landor. In 1852, he married Mary Shaw in Stockport, England and they had 10 children, the first four of which were born in Norwich and the rest in London, Ontario.
