= Kambalda Airport =

Airport in Western Australia

- IATA: KDB; ICAO: YKBL

Summary
- Owner: Shire of Coolgardie
- Location: Kambalda, Western Australia
- Elevation AMSL: 1,037 ft / 316 m
- Coordinates: 31°11′24″S 121°35′54″E

Map
- Location in Western Australia

Runways
Direction	Length		Surface
Direction	m	ft	Surface
16/34	1,800	5,906	Gravel
- Sources: Aeronautical Information Publication

Kambalda Airport (IATA: KDB, ICAO: YKBL) serves St Ives Gold Mine. It is located eight kilometres north-west of Kambalda, Western Australia. It was mothballed in September 2015 after a slump in the resources sector.

As at June 2024, Mineral Resources was negotiating with the Shire of Coolgardie for a 21 year lease on the airport with a commitment to upgrade the airport to accommodate Airbus A319 and A320s. As at 2024, it is predominantly used by charter flight for fly-in fly-out mine workers. Flights are operated by Aerlink, National Jet Express and Skippers Aviation with ATR 72-500 and Dash 8s.
