= Mungari, Western Australia =

Ghost town in Western Australia

Mungari
- Town
- Coordinates: 30.859°S 121.288°E
- Country: Australia
- State: Western Australia
- LGA: Shire of Coolgardie
- Location: 566 km (352 mi) ENE of Perth; 9 km (5.6 mi) NE of Coolgardie
- Established: 1897

Government
  - State electorate: Electoral district of Kalgoorlie
  - Federal division: O'Connor
- Elevation: 392 m (1,286 ft)
- Postcode: 6430

Mungari is a ghost town in Western Australia, located between Coolgardie and Kalgoorlie in the Goldfields-Esperance region of Western Australia.

The town originated as a stop on the railway line between Kalgoorlie and Coolgardie and by 1897 lots were surveyed and a hotel was swiftly built. The name of the town was initially Mungarrie, but this was thought to be too close to the name of another mining town, Mulgarrie, so the spelling was altered to Mungarri. A reserve for the townsite was gazetted in 1897, and the townsite was gazetted in 1904 and spelt as Munngari. The town served as a military training camp during World War I. The spelling of the town was changed to Mungari in 1974.
