= Cowits =

Western Australia's first Aboriginal policeman

Cowits (Note: also spelt Cowett, Cowitch, Cowich, Cowach, Kowich, Kowit, Cowitt or Cowid) was Western Australia's first Aboriginal policeman, and was a member of a number of early exploratory expeditions.

== Cowits and his brother, Souper ==
Cowits came from the York area. He was born around 1832. He had a brother named Souper.

Souper was sentenced to two years prison on Rottnest Island for stealing a sheep from Burges’ farm. His story was set out in a report to Benefit Societies in England, and published in the Perth Gazette in September 1844, when he was reportedly about 11 years of age. (Note: Hence, a year younger than Cowits.) In that story, he gives an account of his time at Rottnest and says that his mother and father and uncles were all dead, but he had a brother in York.

== Young Cowits ==
Cowits was one of four Aboriginal children who were taught the alphabet by Peter Barrow during his 18 months in York in 1840 and 1841.

From 1841, Cowits was being brought up in the house of Dr Henry Landor, (Note: Because he was an orphan, if Souper’s account is correct.) a settler, physician, scientist and explorer, and one of three brothers who came to the Swan River Colony in 1841 intending to make a fortune in six or seven years from sheep farming. (Note: The sheep were squatted at the Dale or Hotham.) In the York census of 1842, Cowits is referred to as “working for settlers in the York (Avon) District”.

Landor farmed in partnership with Nathan Elias Knight, leasing Bland and Trimmer's farm in York, Balladong Farm, and squatting sheep at the Dale and Hotham. (Note: Balladong Farm was purchased by Stephen Parker in 1848 and from the Parker era is still mostly intact.) While there, Landor became concerned with the spread of disease among the Aborigines. It was his opinion that contact with white settlers had been the cause of the virulent diseases. He took it upon himself to gather as many Aborigines as he could to look after them properly, and he applied unsuccessfully for government money for a hospital, though received some funds for medical treatment.

In January 1843, Landor and Henry Maxwell Lefroy explored east of “the Dale” (Beverley) and took Cowits with them “to shoot kangaroos, and to act as interpreter when our guides were unintelligible to us”. (Note: Landor also explored Nornalup and Deep River with a "servant".) (Note: From then on, many major expeditions into Western Australia’s inland areas started from the stables of Balladong Farm including Lefroy (1862), Hunt (1864) and Forrest (1869): Heritage Trail, York, Heritage Council, 1998, p.18.)

In December 1844, Landor explored the Deep River, discovering a "tree so high (63 paces to the first branch) that he could not look over it". (Note: The tree was apparently jarrah.) A storm came and Landor and his "servant" took shelter in the hollow of an old jarrah tree that was so large it could even hold the horses. (Note: The servant was probably Cowits.)

Landor left the Colony in 1845. (Note: He became a naval surgeon in South Africa, returned to England and then emigrated again to Canada to become one of Canada’s pre-eminent experts on insanity.)

== Cowits begins to assist the police ==
Cowits assisted John Drummond, head of police in York, then Toodyay. When Walkinshaw Cowan was appointed Protector of Natives and head of police in York in 1848, Drummond asked Cowits to convey a message to Cowan. Cowan recorded in his diary and also wrote in 1868 about this:

Drummond sent a message to me from Toodyay, forty-five miles distant, by a native named Cowits. This message was received and delivered to me between sunrise and sunset of the same day. Finding how efficiently this native acted with Mr Drummond, and seeing the great benefit that would attend the permanent appointment of native assistants to the police force, I recommended their appointment, and Governor Fitzgerald having agreed to it, Cowits was the first native police assistant in York. Another was appointed for Toodyay, and the employment of them became general throughout the colony. Cowits showed the greatest intelligence in the profession. His word was always to be depended upon, and his pluck and endurance were of the first description. When Mr Drummond left the police, soldiers were appointed in York and Toodyay as police constables. Entirely ignorant of the language, the police constables had to depend on Cowits, who from that time considered himself the head of the police.

However, Cowan began to complain about Drummond. In April 1850, a court of inquiry was held at York to enquire into Cowan's complaints. One of these was that Drummond went drinking at the Kings Head Hotel with Cowits and Tommy the native mail carrier, and did not report or charge anyone. Cowits gave evidence for Drummond which the court believed. The court found the charges "not proved being frivolous and vexatious", though Drummond was suspended from duties for a month.

Also in April 1850, Cowits is recorded as having given evidence in a trial of three Aboriginal people for the murder of Yadupwert; all three were convicted and sentenced to death.

== Cowan tries to get a house for Cowits ==
Despite these difficulties between Cowan and Drummond, Cowan formed a good relationship with Cowits and on 26 August 1850, Cowan wrote to the Governor on behalf of Cowits:

The Native Policeman Cowit appears very anxious to obtain an allotment in the Town of York where he might have a house built and make a garden for himself. He has now got wife and I would be glad if His Excellency would assign him an allotment near to the Barracks, or opposite my house, in order to see what effect it might have on the Natives of the District. He has a number of brothers more or less employed by the settlers, one indeed has the sole charge of Mr Carter’s shop, (Note: At Daliak, refer to advertisement for T & H Carter dated 9 August 1853 in Perth Gazette & Independent Journal of Politics and News, 12 August 1853, p.2.) and the example of the Native Policeman established in a comfortable house might lead them to desire to be similarly settled and to abandon their roaming life. A nucleus might thus be formed around which a throng of the Aborigines might congregate”.

Cowan did not receive a reply to his letter on behalf of Cowits and wrote again on 28 October 1851:

Some time back I applied for an allotment on the Townsite of York for the Native Cowit, attached to the Mounted Police, to build a House and make a garden on, but have had no official reply to my letter. The upper part of the allotment on which the Barrack stables are built on is vacant, and as it is desirable that he should be near my house, it would be convenient His Excellency should give him permission to build on this and enclose it for a garden. At their leisure the Police Constable Bailey and Cowit might do a good deal towards building the house and enclosing the allotment. But I trust His Excellency will grant the assistance of a Ticket of Leave man to construct the walls.

Governor Fitzgerald responded:

There is no objection to allowing this native to erect a building on the allotment in question but he must be his own architect.

In 1852, the prison cells were constructed in York on the area selected by Cowan for Cowits' house, being the first buildings of the current York Courthouse Complex.

== Brothers ==
Apart from Souper, Cowits' brothers were reportedly Nurgap, Dide, Nortap and Billiup. Souper also became an Aboriginal policeman, as did other brothers. In 1852, one brother was a servant of Mr Parker. (Note: presumably at Balladong Farm.)

Souper accidentally shot himself in the thigh in February 1853 in the course of arresting an Aboriginal escapee named Paddy. (Note: In 1855 there is a report of a "Super" being charged with others with the wilful murder of an Aboriginal person, Yurser.)

In 1864, Cowits and Souper were to have accompanied Assistant Surveyor Robert Austin on an expedition to “Shark’s Bay”, but Cowits became sick and had to stay at “Nombekine”, 23 kilometres (14 mi) north of Northam, thereby avoiding the poisoning of horses that the expedition including Souper experienced.

== Further expeditions ==
In 1863, Cowits accompanied Lefroy on his expedition east of York to the interior. Cowits was described by Lefroy as

well known to all the settlers of the York district as an intelligent, sensible, courageous and trustworthy native; an estimate of his character which my observation and experience in this expedition is fully confirmed.

one of the most intelligent and sensible natives that I ever knew”.

The journal of the expedition frequently refers to Cowits’ active and important role in the exploration. Lefroy comments with amusement that Cowits always called their camp “home”. The expedition also took with them a friend of Cowits, Tommy Windich. (Note: Tommy Windich was born around 1840 and was about 8 years younger than Cowits.) John Cowan and Cowits proceeded 97 kilometres (60 mi) beyond Smith’s station, and both had returned to York by mid October 1863.

Cowits also accompanied an expedition of Charles Cooke Hunt to the east of York in 1864, and again in July 1866 (including Windich), and an expedition of McRae and Scholl to the Fortescue in August and September 1866.

He also worked on farms including Grass Dale, as did Windich.

== Discovery of petroleum ==
Cowits and Windich joined Constable Edwards in the police expedition east in May 1866 which discovered petroleum.

== Death ==
Cowits died of influenza, aggravated by drinking, in April 1868. Cowan said of him:

Off and on he has been in the employment of the Government for nearly twenty years. He was out in the early exploration with Dr Landor. He was attached to Mr Lefroy and Mr Hunt in their several expeditions, and also was engaged in many private ones. He has accompanied me in my periodical visits from York to the Williams River and back, and from York to Dundarragan (sic), taking in Gingin and Bindoon, a stretch of 300 miles and upwards. I always felt the greatest confidence in him, and greatly preferred him with me to one of the soldiers. In this native there was no vulgarity. He was one of nature’s gentlemen. There was no end to his spirit, cheerfulness and anecdote. Every spot had its legend or tale.
