= Kansas Dental Board =

State agency in Kansas

- The Great Seal of the State of Kansas

Agency overview
- Headquarters: 900 SW Jackson, 5th Floor; Topeka, Kansas 66612
- Agency executive: B. Lane Hemsley, Executive Director
- Parent agency: Kansas Department of Health and Environment
- Website: Kansas Dental Board

The Kansas Dental Board (KDB) is the state agency regulating dentistry. Its headquarters are in Room 564-S in the Landon State Office Building in Topeka.

== Board Members ==
- Glenn Hemberger, D.D.S. (President)
- Charles Squire, D.D.S. (vice-president)
- Susan Rodgers, R.D.H. (Secretary)
- Scott Hamilton, D.D.S.
- Jarrod Jones, D.D.S.
- Donna Thomas, D.D.S.
- Jeff Stasch, D.D.S.
- Jackie Leakey, R.D.H.
- Jim Showalter, C.P.A. (Public Member)
