= Kambalda, Western Australia =

Kambalda
- Town
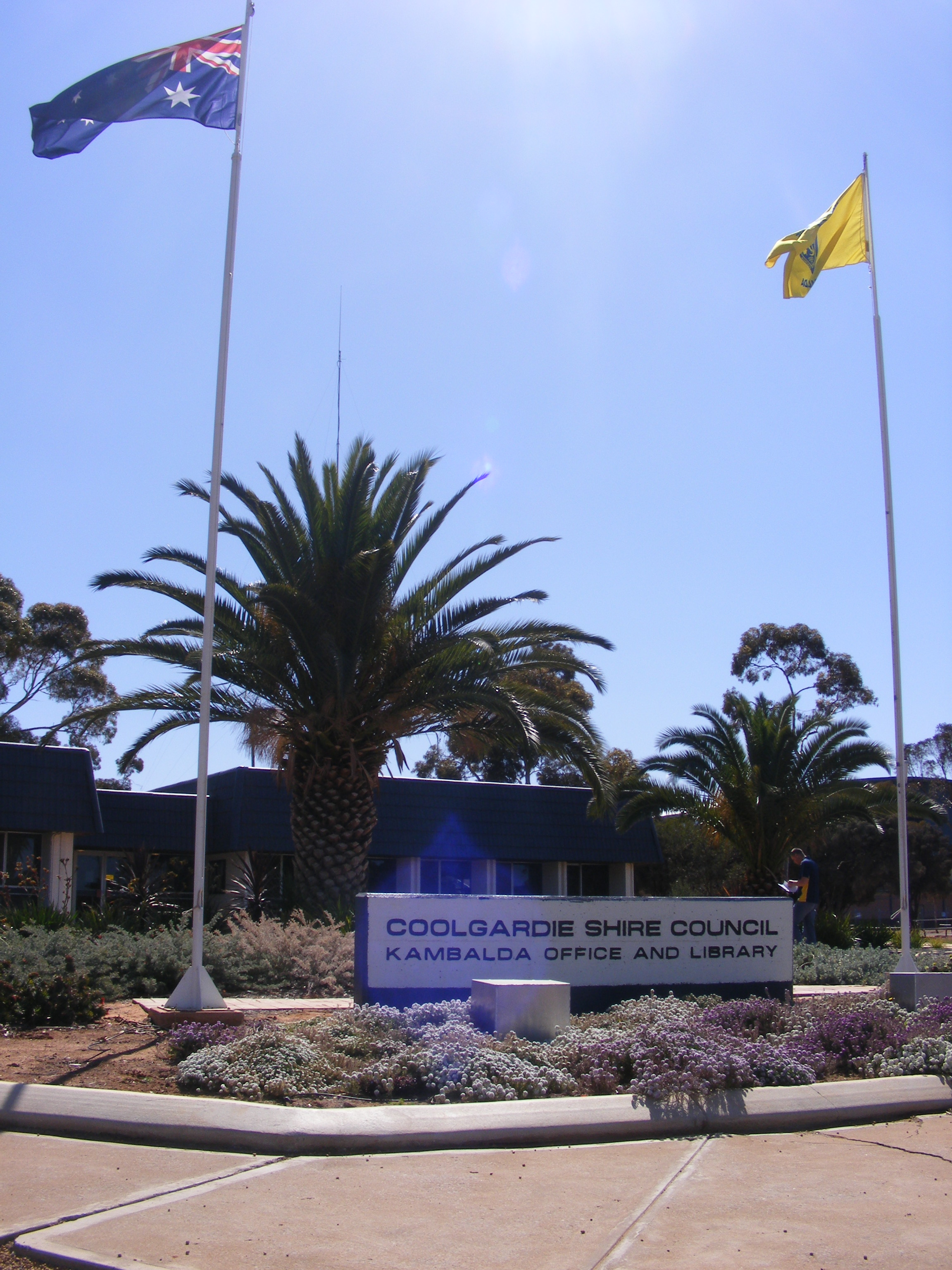
- Shire of Coolgardie Office

- Coordinates: 31°12′30″S 121°38′36″E
- Country: Australia
- State: Western Australia
- LGA: Shire of Coolgardie
- Location: 616 km (383 mi) from Perth; 55 km (34 mi) from Kalgoorlie; 130 km (81 mi) from Norseman; 74 km (46 mi) from Coolgardie
- Established: Kambalda East (1967–1973); Kambalda West (1969–1975)

Government
  - State electorate: Kalgoorlie
  - Federal division: O'Connor

Population
  - Total: 2,468 (2021 census) (Note: Comprises Kambalda West (1,666) and Kambalda East (802).)
- Postcode: 6442

Kambalda is a small mining town about 60 kilometres (37 mi) from Kalgoorlie in Western Australia, within the Goldfields. It is split into two townsites 4 kilometres (2.5 mi) apart, Kambalda East and Kambalda West; and is located on the western edge of a giant salt lake, Lake Lefroy. At the last census, Kambalda had a total population of 2,468.

Kambalda was established in 1897 at the base of nearby Red Hill during a mining boom when prospectors from all over Western Australia came into the area. The settlement owes its existence to Percy Larkin, a prospector who discovered gold in the vicinity. For many years Kambalda was mined for its gold but soon after nickel was discovered.

== History ==
Kambalda is situated in a semi-arid environment on the land of the Galaagu people, approximately 75 kilometres (47 mi) southeast of Coolgardie and 616 kilometres (383 mi) east of Perth. Kambalda's determination to keep as much native flora as possible separates them from other similar mining towns. Kambalda West is approximately 4 km (2.5 mi) from Kambalda East and is the location of the tourist bureau and the shire offices.

The original settlement of Kambalda grew up in the area after Percy Larkin discovered gold in December 1896. The town was officially gazetted on 10 December 1897 and laid out by the Government surveyor W. Rowley, who chose the name Kambalda. The Red Hill Gold Mine, which began operations in 1897, was relatively short-lived. It was closed by 1907 and the small settlement had become a ghost town. One memory of the original town is the old well in George Cowcill Street.

New interest in the area occurred in 1954 when George Cowcill took samples of what he thought was uranium. Later analysis found large deposits of nickel and by 1966 Western Mining Corporation had established Australia's first nickel mine. It is fair to describe Kambalda East and Kambalda West as Australia's first nickel mining towns. Apart from the Red Hill Lookout with its views over Lake Lefroy, and the opportunity to drive across the causeway, the town offers historical attractions and modern amenities, with a 24-hour RV stop area, shops and a skate park. Kambalda is known for its feral goats.

== Present day ==
The first mining company that established the town was the Western Mining Corporation, which in 2005 was taken over by BHP Billiton. Other mining companies in the area include Gold Fields, Lightning Nickel, and GHB.

The town population has more recently been receding, thought to be due to increasing fly-in fly-out operations by mining companies.

== Attractions ==
Kambalda's best attraction is the Red Hill Lookout, which is accessed by following Gordon Adams Road. Red Hill has a bushwalking trail (Red Hill Walking Trail), and from the top travellers have a bird's eye view of nearby Lake Lefroy, a large 510 km^{2} (200 sq mi) salt pan which stretches to the horizon and is rarely filled with water. The Lake is often used for land-sailing.

Kambalda's Memorial Garden and Miners Memorial Wall are situated behind the Shire office in Kambalda West. The Garden has a shady gazebo surrounded by native plants and scented roses. The Memorial Wall was built to honour those who had lost their lives while working in Kambalda's mines.

Also located within the Kambalda area are the remains of King Battery. Located on Woolibah station, the King Battery was employed to process gold-bearing ores from local gold mines. Today all that remains of the original operation is a tower and some brickwork which housed a tailings wheel which is often mistaken for a water paddle wheel. The King Battery area also provides a venue for bushwalking and picnic activities.

Each year, Kambalda hosts these and many other events:

- December: Community Christmas Tree

== Services ==
The town is serviced with a supermarket, post office, newsagency, public library, hotel, recreation centre, a petrol station and two schools. The ANZ Bank branch closed in September 2018.

Kambalda Airport was mothballed in September 2015 after a slump in the resources sector. As at June 2024, Aerlink, National Jet Express and Skippers Aviation operated charter flights for the nearby mines.

The Kambalda Health Centre is open six days a week and is staffed by nursing staff; as of November 2018 St John Health has rolled out its first regional medical practice, with a doctor available Monday to Saturday, including until 9 pm Thursday evenings. The Health Centre has emergency resuscitation facilities as well as pathology services.

There are also a number of defibrillators located around both town sites.
