= Mount Burges, Western Australia =

Mount Burges
- Town
- Interactive map of Mount Burges
- Coordinates: 30°42′35″S 120°43′40″E
- Country: Australia
- State: Western Australia
- LGA: Shire of Coolgardie
- Location: 569 km (354 mi) from Perth; 40 km (25 mi) from Kalgoorlie; 13 km (8.1 mi) from Coolgardie

Government
  - State electorate: Kalgoorlie
  - Federal division: O'Connor

Area
  - Total: 3,266.7 km^{2} (1,261.3 sq mi)

Population
  - Total: 116 (SAL 2021)
- Postcode: 6429

Mount Burges is a town in the Goldfields-Esperance region of Western Australia.
