= Henry Maxwell Lefroy =

Explorer and pastoralist in Western Australia

Henry Maxwell Lefroy (August 1818 – 18 July 1879) was a explorer of the Mid West and Goldfields-Esperance regions of Western Australia.

He was the son of Rev. John Henry George Lefroy, the rector of Compton and Ashe, who died when his son was five, leaving his widow and nine other children.

He had studied at Guildford Grammar School in Surrey, where he became acquainted with the Stirling family and first developed an interest in the Swan River Colony in Western Australia. He later studied at Oxford University and had many conversations with the son of Captain Yates, who furthered his interest in the colony.

Lefroy arrived in the colony in 1841 and took up land in York. He left York in 1843 with Henry Landor on an expedition, accompanied by 10 year old aboriginal boy, Cowits or Kowitch to translate. They crossed the Hotham River and went on to discover and name Kowitch Pool and the Lefroy River, and then returned after a fortnight. He returned to England to serve in the Royal Navy and returned to Western Australia as the Superintendent of Convicts in 1854. In 1860 he followed the Williams River eastward and explored the Darling Scarp.

Lefroy and Landor completed another expedition to the Goldfields in 1863, where the party passed through areas such as Bruce Rock, Dumbleyung and Coolgardie. They trekked for a total of 85 days, including four days with no water, before returning to York. Lake Lefroy was named by the explorer Charles Cooke Hunt in 1864 after Lefroy, who would have seen the lake during his visit.

Lefroy retired from his position as Superintendent of Convicts in 1875, and died in Fremantle on 18 July 1879 of pneumonia. He was buried at Karrakatta Cemetery.
