= Lake Lefroy =

Lake in Western Australia

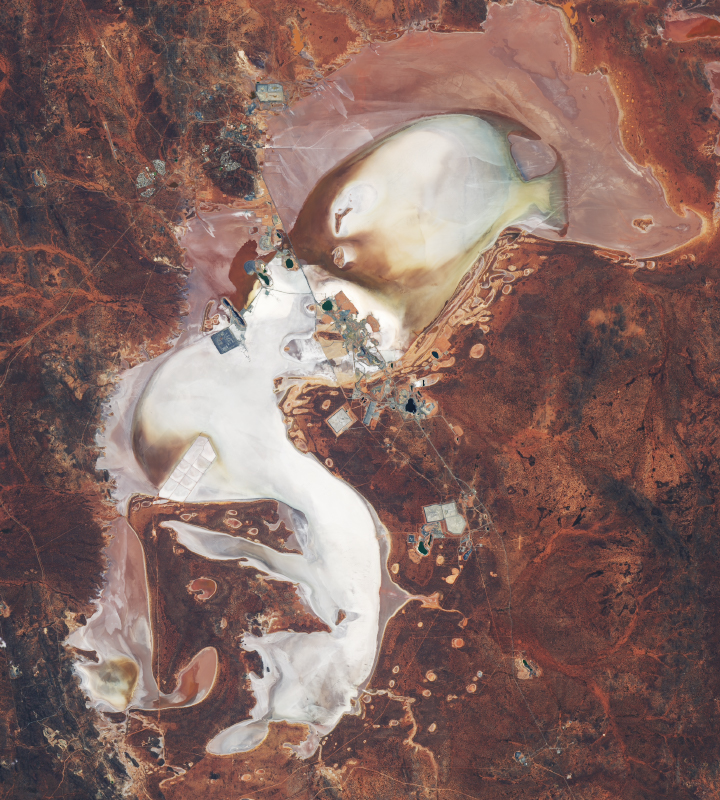
- Satellite image of Lake Lefroy

- Location in Western Australia
- Interactive map of Lake Lefroy
- Location: Kambalda, Western Australia
- Coordinates: 31°18′S 121°42′E
- Catchment area: 4,160 square kilometres (1,606 mi^{2})
- Basin countries: Australia

Lake Lefroy is a large ephemeral salt lake in the Goldfields-Esperance region of Western Australia. It is north of Lake Cowan and approximately 55 kilometres (34 mi) south of Boulder. The town of Kambalda is on the northern shore and the hamlet of Widgiemooltha near the southern edge.

== Description ==
Lake Lefroy is a clay pan covered with a crust of salt that supports little vegetation. It fills episodically in response to heavy rainfall. Following inundation, a drying phase is relatively rapid due to high evaporation rates and surface water may only last for a few months. When the lake contains water there may be relatively large fluctuations in water level over very short periods. The shallow surface water in the lake is blown back and forth across the lake bed by prevailing winds.

The lake was named on 21 August 1864 by the explorer Charles Cooke Hunt after fellow explorer Henry Maxwell Lefroy, who had conducted an expedition in the area with Henry Landor in 1843.

In January 1897 alluvial gold was discovered at Red Hill, on the northern edge of the lake by the prospector Percy Larkin. His first parcel of 106 ounces (3,005 g) of gold was found near where Kambalda stands today.

The lake is used for land sailing, and is considered to be one of the best places to sail a land yacht due to its size and the texture of its surface.

The lake has been used in the past for Australian land speed record attempts and hosted the 2007 Pacrim Land Sailing Event with competitors from all over the world.

In 2008 Britons Dale Vince and Richard Jenkins spent two weeks on the lake with a land yacht with solid sails like an aircraft wing, to attempt the world wind powered vehicle record, but the attempt was abandoned due to constant delays caused by heavy rain and no wind.

In 2016 Qantas showed Lake Lefroy During their Qantas safety video

== See also ==
- List of lakes of Australia § Western Australia
