= Fergie Reid =

Australian politician

Member of the Legislative Assembly of Western Australia
- In office 24 April 1901 – 28 June 1904
- Preceded by: None (new seat)
- Succeeded by: None (abolished)
- Constituency: Mount Burges

Personal details
- Born: 1849 Ayrshire, Scotland
- Died: 18 November 1924 (aged 74–75) Cottesloe, Western Australia, Australia
- Party: Labor Party

Fergie Reid (1849 – 18 November 1924) was an Australian trade unionist and politician who was a Labor Party member of the Legislative Assembly of Western Australia from 1901 to 1904, representing the seat of Mount Burges.

Reid was born in Ayrshire, Scotland, and began working in the mines in Linlithgow at the age of twelve. He emigrated to Australia in 1878, initially living in Newcastle, New South Wales, where he became involved in the growing labour movement. Reid arrived in Western Australia in 1896, and lived for periods in Leonora, Malcolm, and Coolgardie. He was a branch official of the Australian Workers' Association in the Eastern Goldfields, and was also a justice of the peace. Reid entered parliament at the 1901 state election, winning the newly created seat of Mount Burges. His seat was abolished at the 1904 election, and he unsuccessfully sought Labor preselection for the seat of Yilgarn, losing to Austin Horan.

At the 1904 Legislative Council elections, Reid was preselected as the Labor candidate for Metropolitan Province, but a last-minute mix-up meant his nomination did not go through. The only other nominee, George Randell, was consequently re-elected unopposed. Reid again stood for parliament at the 1905 state election, running for Yilgarn as an Independent Labor candidate against Austin Horan, his old opponent for preselection. He had the support of a respected former MP, William Oats, but was defeated with 41.3 percent of the vote. After leaving parliament, Reid lived in York and Dulbelling for periods, eventually retiring to Perth, where he died in 1924. He had married Rachel Menzies in 1874, with whom he had nine children.

Parliament of Western Australia
New seat	Member for Mount Burges; 1901–1904	Abolished
