= Kintore, Western Australia =

Abandoned town in Western Australia

Kintore
- Town
- Coordinates: 30.601°S 121.02°E
- Country: Australia
- State: Western Australia
- LGA: Shire of Coolgardie
- Location: 640 km (400 mi) ENE of Perth; 45 km (28 mi) NW of Kalgoorlie
- Established: 1897

Government
  - State electorate: Eyre
  - Federal division: O'Connor
- Elevation: 417 m (1,368 ft)
- Postcode: 6430

Kintore is an abandoned town in Western Australia located 46 kilometres (29 mi) north-west of Kalgoorlie along the Coolgardie North Road in the Goldfields-Esperance region of Western Australia.

Gold was discovered in the area in December 1894 by prospectors Leith and Barrett. The first mine was named after Algernon Keith-Falconer, 9th Earl of Kintore, the retiring Governor of South Australia who was visiting Western Australia at the time. Following a rapid growth in population the local progress committee petitioned for the town to be declared and the town was gazetted in 1897.

By 1898 the population of the town was 240 (200 males and 40 females).
