= Charles Cooke Hunt =

Explorer in Western Australia

- Born: 1833; Sussex, England
- Died: 1 March 1868 (aged 34–35); Geraldton, Western Australia, Australia
- Known for: leading explorations into the interior of Western Australia

Charles Cooke Hunt (1833 – 1 March 1868, Geraldton) was an English explorer who led four expeditions into the interior of Western Australia between 1864 and 1866.

Hunt was born in Sussex to John Hunt and Mary Ann (née Cooke) and baptised at St. Nicholas, Brighton, on 14 August 1833. He was a navigator when he arrived in the Swan River Colony in 1863. He started working as an assistant surveyor in Fremantle. In April 1863 Hunt and J. B. Ridley were supplied to Walter Padbury for his private expedition to the north-west coast as explorers and surveyors in the cutter Mystery, following a stretch of coast which included the harbour now known as Port Hedland. Hunt never put his name to any of his discoveries, but the pass between the De Grey River district and Nickol Bay district was later named after him.

In 1864, he was asked to look for the pastoral land and water supplies identified along the route of Henry Lefroy's 1863 expedition into what is now known as the Coolgardie area. Hunt's party of six included Kowitch, the Aboriginal guide from Lefroy's expedition. Leaving York on 9 July they reached Gnarlbine Rock on 16 August. From Gnarlbine the party headed east towards Lake Lefroy. Hunt gave a good report of the grasslands that Lefroy had sighted and these were later named the Hampton Plains after Governor Hampton.

His third expedition was between January and October 1865 and he led the expedition of six Pensioner Guards, ten convicts and George Mundial, an Aboriginal. This expedition was sent to establish a track and enlarge wells between York and Gnarlbine to enable livestock to be moved to the Hampton Plains. They established 23 wells.

In 1866, Hunt led another party to extend the track and wells to Lake Lefroy and create another track with wells leading north-east through the Coolgardie area. With him as second-in-command on this expedition was Frederick Mackie Roe, son of John Septimus Roe. Hunt noted in his diaries that on many occasions he was "too ill to work today". Despite this, he continued until the track was completed. Prospectors Bayley and Ford in 1892 used the new track and wells to gain access to the area in which they were to be successful in discovering gold. The track was later utilised by C. Y. O'Connor in building the Goldfields Water Supply Scheme.

Hunt became ill in December 1867 and was in hospital by January 1868. He died from heart disease on 1 March 1868, aged 35.
