= Kambalda West, Western Australia =

Kambalda West
- Town
- Coordinates: 31°12′41.14″S 121°42′46.30″E
- Country: Australia
- State: Western Australia
- LGA(s): Shire of Coolgardie
- Location: 631 km (392 mi) from Perth; 60 km (37 mi) from Kalgoorlie; 77 km (48 mi) from Coolgardie

Government
  - State electorate(s): Kalgoorlie
  - Federal division(s): O'Connor

Area
  - Total: 124.1 km^{2} (47.9 sq mi)

Population
  - Total(s): 1,660 (UCL 2021)
- Postcode: 6442

Kambalda West is a town in the Goldfields-Esperance region of Western Australia.
