= Shire of Coolgardie =

Coordinates: 30°57′11″S 121°09′50″E

- Local government area
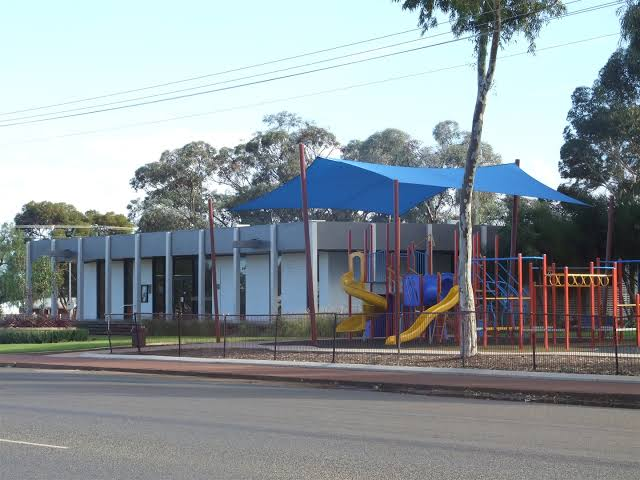
- Shire of Coolgardie office

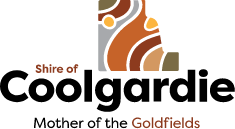
- Interactive map of Shire of Coolgardie
- Country: Australia
- State: Western Australia
- Region: Goldfields-Esperance
- Established: 1921
- Council seat: Coolgardie

Government
  - Shire President: Malcolm Cullen
  - State electorate: Kalgoorlie
  - Federal division: O'Connor

Area
  - Total: 30,400 km^{2} (11,700 sq mi)

Population
  - Total: 3,478 (LGA 2021)
- Website: Shire of Coolgardie
LGAs around Shire of Coolgardie
Menzies	Menzies	Kalgoorlie- Boulder
Yilgarn	Shire of Coolgardie	Kalgoorlie- Boulder
Yilgarn	Dundas	Dundas

The Shire of Coolgardie is a local government area in the Goldfields–Esperance region of Western Australia, lying roughly west and south of the city of Kalgoorlie. The Shire covers an area of 30,400 square kilometres (11,738 sq mi), and its seat of government is the town of Coolgardie, although the twin towns of Kambalda East and Kambalda West contain two-thirds of the Shire's population.

== History ==
The Shire of Coolgardie originated as the Coolgardie Road District, which was established on 7 August 1896, consisting of the rural areas surrounding the town of Coolgardie, which had already been incorporated as the Municipality of Coolgardie in 1894. As the gold rush waned in the area, the municipality merged into the road district on 20 May 1921.

It was declared a shire with effect from 1 July 1961 following the passage of the Local Government Act 1960, which reformed all remaining road districts into shires.

== Wards ==
In 2007, the ward system was abolished. Prior to this, the Shire had eight councillors and four wards:

- Kambalda West (three councillors)
- Kambalda (two councillors)
- Coolgardie (two councillors)
- Country (one councillor)

== Towns and localities ==
The towns and localities of the Shire of Coolgardie with population and size figures based on the most recent Australian census:

Suburb	Population	Area	Map
Boorabbin	48 (SAL 2021)	2,274.4 km^{2} (878.2 sq mi)	
Bullabulling	0 (SAL 2021)	1,216.9 km^{2} (469.8 sq mi)	
Coolgardie	773 (SAL 2021)	125 km^{2} (48 sq mi)	
Higginsville	19 (SAL 2021)	1,025.4 km^{2} (395.9 sq mi)	
Kambalda East	802 (SAL 2021)	101.8 km^{2} (39.3 sq mi)	
Kambalda West	1,666 (SAL 2021)	124.1 km^{2} (47.9 sq mi)	
Karramindie	33 (SAL 2021)	737.7 km^{2} (284.8 sq mi)	
Londonderry	0 (SAL 2016)	1,083.8 km^{2} (418.5 sq mi)	
Mount Burges	116 (SAL 2021)	3,266.7 km^{2} (1,261.3 sq mi)	
Victoria Rock	0 (SAL 2016)	9,434.3 km^{2} (3,642.6 sq mi)	
Wallaroo	0 (SAL 2016)	4,996.7 km^{2} (1,929.2 sq mi)	
Widgiemooltha	28 (SAL 2021)	5,942.9 km^{2} (2,294.6 sq mi)	

== Ghost towns ==
Ghost towns in the Shire of Coolgardie:

- Bonnie Vale
- Burbanks (also Burbanks Gold Mine)
- Dunnsville
- Kintore
- Kunanalling
- Kundana
- Kurrawang
- Mungari
- Spargoville

== Heritage-listed places ==
As of 2023, 161 places are heritage-listed in the Shire of Coolgardie, of which 27 are on the State Register of Heritage Places.
