= Londonderry, Western Australia =

Ghost town in Western Australia

Londonderry
- Town
- Coordinates: 31.072°S 121.116°E
- Country: Australia
- State: Western Australia
- LGA(s): Shire of Coolgardie
- Location: 572 km (355 mi) ENE of Perth; 14 km (8.7 mi) SSW of Coolgardie
- Established: 1895

Government
  - State electorate(s): Electoral district of Kalgoorlie
  - Federal division(s): O'Connor

Area
  - Total: 1,083.8 km^{2} (418.5 sq mi)
- Elevation: 398 m (1,306 ft)

Population
  - Total(s): 0 (SAL 2016)
- Postcode: 6429

Londonderry is a ghost town in Western Australia, located 14 km South West of Coolgardie in the Goldfields-Esperance region of Western Australia.

Gold was discovered in the area in 1894 by a party of prospectors, one of whom named the find after his home town of Londonderry. Lord Fingall took over the find in 1892 but the gold soon petered out. The townsite was gazetted in 1895.

By 1898 the town had a population of 220 (200 males and 20 females).
