= Dunnsville, Western Australia =

Abandoned town in Western Australia

Dunnsville
- Town
- Coordinates: 30.632°S 120.876°E
- Country: Australia
- State: Western Australia
- LGA: Shire of Coolgardie
- Location: 604 km (375 mi) ENE of Perth; 46 km (29 mi) NW of Coolgardie
- Established: 1897

Government
  - State electorate: Eyre
  - Federal division: O'Connor
- Elevation: 465 m (1,526 ft)
- Postcode: 6430

Dunnsville is an abandoned town in Western Australia located 46 km north-west of Coolgardie in the Goldfields-Esperance region of Western Australia.

In 1894, gold was discovered in the area by a prospector, John George Dunn F.R.G.S, and the townsite was gazetted on 9 December 1897.

By 1898, the population of the town was 67 (60 males and 7 females).

The original lease later became better known as the Wealth of Nations mine. A coach service operated between the town and Coolgardie.

Between 1894 and 1938, the combined gold production of Dunnsville and the nearby Jaurdi Hills was 28,041 ounces (795 kg) from 45,500 tonnes of ore.
