= Bullabulling, Western Australia =

Place in the Goldfields-Esperance region of Western Australia

Bullabulling
- Town
- Interactive map of Bullabulling
- Coordinates: 31.012°S 120.871°E
- Country: Australia
- State: Western Australia
- LGA: Shire of Coolgardie
- Location: 528 km (328 mi) ENE of Perth, Western Australia; 30 km (19 mi) west of Coolgardie
- Established: 1898

Government
  - State electorate: Eyre
  - Federal division: O'Connor

Area
  - Total: 1,216.9 km^{2} (469.8 sq mi)
- Elevation: 450 m (1,480 ft)

Population
  - Total: 0 (SAL 2021)
- Postcode: 6429

Bullabulling (spelled "Bulla Bulling" until 1944) is a small townsite located 526 km (327 mi) east of Perth, Western Australia on the Great Eastern Highway in the Goldfields-Esperance region.

The town was gazetted in 1898, when the population of the town was 160 (140 males and 20 females). Its central feature was the Rock Hotel roadhouse (also known as Rock Tavern), which closed around 2015. Bullabulling is also the location of a reservoir which forms part of the Goldfields Water Supply Scheme. From here, the water gravitates (i.e. moves without pumping) to Coolgardie and Kalgoorlie.

In 1996, Bullabulling was registered as a place of cultural heritage significance.
