= List of Eremophila (plant) species =

About 220 species of Eremophila have been formally described and about 40 more have been discovered but not formally described. The genus is endemic to Australia except that one species, (Eremophila debilis) is also found in New Zealand.

Of the species described so far, 190 are found in Western Australia whilst about 80% of those are only found in that state. All the as yet undescribed species are endemic to Western Australia.

The following is a list of the species in the genus Eremophila (figwort family, Scrophulariaceae) accepted by the Australian Plant Census as at 20 April 2019, apart from E. sericea and E. xantholaema, recently described species in the journal Nuytsia but not yet assessed:

- Eremophila abietina Kraenzl. – spotted poverty bush (W.A.)
- Eremophila accrescens Chinnock (W.A.)
- Eremophila acrida Chinnock (N.T., Qld.)
- Eremophila adenotricha (F.Muell. ex Benth.) F.Muell. – glandular-haired eremophila (W.A.)
- Eremophila alatisepala Chinnock (Qld.)
- Eremophila alternifolia R.Br. – narrow-leaved emu bush (W.A., S.A., N.T., N.S.W.)
- Eremophila annosicaulis Chinnock (W.A.)
- Eremophila anomala Chinnock – Paroo poverty bush (W.A.)
- Eremophila appressa Chinnock – wispy eremophila (W.A.)
- Eremophila arachnoides Chinnock – spider web eremophila (W.A., S.A.)
- Eremophila arbuscula Chinnock (Qld.)
- Eremophila arenaria Chinnock (N.T., S.A., W.A.)
- Eremophila arguta Chinnock (W.A.)
- Eremophila attenuata Chinnock – Connie Sue poverty bush (W.A.)
- Eremophila aureivisca Chinnock – Rason poverty bush (W.A.)
- Eremophila ballythunnensis Buirchell & A.P.Br. (W.A.)
- Eremophila barbata Chinnock (S.A.)
- Eremophila battii F.Muell. – Batt's poverty bush (W.A., N.T., S.A.)
- Eremophila behriana (Benth.) F.Muell. (S.A.)
- Eremophila bignoniiflora F.Muell. – gooramurra, bignonia emu bush (N.S.W., Qld., S.A., Vic.)
- Eremophila biserrata Chinnock – prostrate eremophila (W.A.)
- Eremophila bowmanii (Benth.) F.Muell. – silver turkeybush, Bowman's poverty bush, flannel bush (N.S.W., Qld.)
- Eremophila brevifolia (Bartl.) F.Muell. – spotted eremophila (W.A.)
- Eremophila buirchellii A.P.Br. (W.A.)
- Eremophila caerulea (S.Moore) Diels (W.A.)
- Eremophila caespitosa Chinnock – felty-leaved eremophila (W.A.)
- Eremophila calcicola R.W.Davis (W.A.)
- Eremophila calorhabdos Diels – red rod (W.A.)
- Eremophila campanulata Chinnock – bell-flowered poverty bush (W.A.)
- Eremophila canaliculata Chinnock (W.A.)
- Eremophila caperata Chinnock (W.A.)
- Eremophila capricornica Buirchell & A.P.Br. (W.A.)
- Eremophila chamaephila Diels – earth-loving eremophila (W.A.)
- Eremophila christopheri F.Muell. (N.T.)
- Eremophila ciliata Chinnock – Archer's poverty bush (W.A.)
- Eremophila citrina Chinnock (W.A.)
- Eremophila clarkei Oldfield & F.Muell. – turpentine bush (W.A.)
- Eremophila clavata Chinnock (W.A.)
- Eremophila coacta Chinnock (W.A.)
- Eremophila compacta S.Moore – compact emu bush (W.A.)
- Eremophila complanata Chinnock (W.A.)
- Eremophila compressa Chinnock (W.A.)
- Eremophila conferta Chinnock (W.A.)
- Eremophila congesta Chinnock (W.A.)
- Eremophila conglomerata Chinnock (W.A.)
- Eremophila cordatisepala L.S.Sm. (Qld., N.T.)
- Eremophila crassifolia (F.Muell.) F.Muell. (S.A., Vic., N.S.W.)
- Eremophila crenulata Chinnock (W.A.)
- Eremophila cryptothrix Chinnock (W.A.)
- Eremophila cuneata Chinnock (W.A.)
- Eremophila cuneifolia Kraenzl. – pinyuru (W.A.)
- Eremophila daddii Buirchell & A.P.Br. (W.A.)
- Eremophila dalyana F.Muell. (Qld., S.A., N.T.)
- Eremophila debilis (Andrews) Chinnock – winter apple, amulla (N.S.W.)
- Eremophila decipiens Ostenf. – slender fuchsia bush (W.A.)
- Eremophila decussata Chinnock (W.A., S.A.)
- Eremophila delisseri F.Muell. (S.A.)
- Eremophila demissa Chinnock (W.A.)
- Eremophila dempsteri F.Muell. (W.A.)
- Eremophila dendriticaChinnock (S.A., W.A.)
- Eremophila densifolia F.Muell. – dense-leaved eremophila (W.A.)
- Eremophila denticulata F.Muell. – toothed poverty bush (W.A.)
- Eremophila deserti (A.Cunn. ex Benth.) Chinnock (Qld., N.S.W., Vic., W.A.)
- Eremophila dichroantha Diels – bale hook eremophila (W.A.)
- Eremophila divaricata (F.Muell.) F.Muell. – spreading emu bush (N.S.W., Qld., S.A., Vic.)
- Eremophila drummondii F.Muell. – Drummond's eremophila (W.A.)
- Eremophila duttonii F.Muell. – budda harlequin fuchsia bush (N.S.W., N.T., Qld., S.A., W.A.)
- Eremophila elderi F.Muell. – aromatic emu bush (N.T., S.A., W.A.)
- Eremophila enata Chinnock (W.A.)
- Eremophila eriocalyx F.Muell. (W.A.) – desert pride
- Eremophila eversa Chinnock (W.A.)
- Eremophila exilifolia F.Muell. (W.A.)
- Eremophila falcata Chinnock – sickle-leafed eremophila (W.A.)
- Eremophila fallax Chinnock (S.A., W.A.)
- Eremophila fasciata Chinnock – spaghetti eremophila (W.A.)
- Eremophila ferricola Buirchell & A.P.Br. (W.A.)
- Eremophila flabellata Chinnock (W.A.)
- Eremophila flaccida Chinnock (W.A.)
- Eremophila foliosissima Kraenzlin – poverty bush (W.A.)
- Eremophila forrestii F.Muell. – Wilcox bush (N.T., S.A., W.A.)
- Eremophila fraseri F.Muell. – burra (W.A.)
- Eremophila freelingii F.Muell. – limestone fuchsia, rock fuchsia bush (N.S.W., Qld., S.A.)
- Eremophila galeata Chinnock (W.A.)
- Eremophila georgei Diels (W.A.)
- Eremophila gibbifolia (F.Muell.) F.Muell. – coccid emu bush (S.A., Vic.)
- Eremophila gibbosa Chinnock – humped fuchsia bush (W.A.)
- Eremophila gibsonii F.Muell. (N.T., S.A., W.A.)
- Eremophila gilesii F.Muell. – Charleville turkey bush, green turkey bush, Giles emu bush (N.T., Qld., S.A., W.A.)
- Eremophila glabra (R.Br.) Ostenf. – common emu bush (N.S.W., N.T., Qld., S.A., W.A.)
- Eremophila glandulifera Chinnock (W.A.)
- Eremophila glutinosa Chinnock – sticky emu bush (W.A.)
- Eremophila goodwinii F.Muell. – purple fuchsia bush, Goodwin's emu bush (N.S.W., N.T., Qld., W.A.)
- Eremophila graciliflora F.Muell. – slender-flowered eremophila (W.A.)
- Eremophila gracillima Chinnock (W.A.)
- Eremophila grandiflora Buirchell & A.P.Br. (W.A.)
- Eremophila granitica S.Moore – granite poverty bush, thin-leaved poverty bush (W.A.)
- Eremophila hamulata Buirchell & A.P.Br. (W.A.)
- Eremophila hillii E.A.Shaw – Hill's emu bush (S.A., W.A.)
- Eremophila hispida Chinnock (Qld.)
- Eremophila homoplastica (S.Moore) C.A.Gardner (W.A.)
- Eremophila hughesii F.Muell. (N.T.)
- Eremophila humilis Chinnock (W.A.)
- Eremophila hygrophana Chinnock (W.A.)
- Eremophila incisa Chinnock (W.A.)
- Eremophila interstans S.Moore (S.A., W.A.)
- Eremophila ionantha Diels – violet-flowered eremophila (W.A.)
- Eremophila jamesiorum Buirchell & A.P.Br. (W.A.)
- Eremophila jucunda Chinnock (S.A., W.A.)
- Eremophila koobabbiensis Chinnock (W.A.)
- Eremophila laanii F.Muell. (W.A.)
- Eremophila labrosa Chinnock (W.A.)
- Eremophila laccata Chinnock (W.A.)
- Eremophila lachnocalyx C.A.Gardner – woolly-sepaled eremophila (W.A.)
- Eremophila lactea Chinnock – milky emu bush (W.A.)
- Eremophila lanata Chinnock (W.A.)
- Eremophila lanceolata Chinnock (W.A.)
- Eremophila latrobei F.Muell. – native fuchsia, crimson turkey bush (N.S.W., N.T., Qld., S.A., W.A.)
- Eremophila lehmanniana (Sond.) Chinnock (W.A.)
- Eremophila linearis Chinnock – harlequin fuchsia bush (W.A.)
- Eremophila linsmithiiR.J.F.Hend. (Qld.)
- Eremophila longifolia (R.Br.) F.Muell. – berrigan (W.A.)
- Eremophila lucida Chinnock – shining poverty bush (W.A.)
- Eremophila macdonnellii F.Muell. – MacDonnell's desert fuchsia (N.T., Qld., S.A.)
- Eremophila macgillivrayi J.M.Black – dog bush (Qld., S.A.)
- Eremophila mackinlayi F.Muell. – desert pride (W.A.)
- Eremophila macmillaniana C.A.Gardner – grey turpentine bush (W.A.)
- Eremophila maculata (Ker Gawl.) F.Muell. – spotted emu bush (N.S.W., N.T., Qld., S.A., Vic.)
- Eremophila magnifica Chinnock (W.A.)
- Eremophila maitlandii Benth. – Shark Bay poverty bush (W.A.)
- Eremophila malacoides Chinnock – frontage poverty bush (W.A.)
- Eremophila margarethae S.Moore – sandbank poverty bush (W.A.)
- Eremophila metallicorum S.Moore – miners poverty bush (W.A.)
- Eremophila micrantha Chinnock – small-flowered poverty bush (W.A.)
- Eremophila microtheca (F.Muell. ex Benth.) F. Muell. – heath like eremophila (W.A.)
- Eremophila miniata C.A.Gardner – Kopi poverty bush, plumridge (W.A.)
- Eremophila mirabilis Chinnock (W.A.)
- Eremophila mitchellii Benth. – false sandalwood (N.S.W., Qld.)
- Eremophila muelleriana C.A.Gardner - round-leaved eremophila (W.A.)
- Eremophila neglecta Kraenzl. (N.T., S.A.)
- Eremophila nivea Chinnock – silky eremophila (W.A.)
- Eremophila obliquisepala Chinnock (W.A.)
- Eremophila oblonga Chinnock (W.A.)
- Eremophila obovata L.S.Sm. (N.T., S.A.)
- Eremophila occidens Chinnock (W.A.)
- Eremophila oldfieldii Chinnock – pixie bush (W.A.)
- Eremophila oppositifolia R.Br. – weeooka (N.S.W., Qld., S.A., Vic., W.A.)
- Eremophila ovata Chinnock (N.T.)
- Eremophila paisleyi F.Muell. (N.T., S.A.)
- Eremophila pallida Chinnock (W.A.)
- Eremophila pantonii F.Muell. – broombush (W.A.)
- Eremophila papillata Chinnock (W.A.)
- Eremophila parvifolia J.M.Black – small-leaved poverty bush (S.A., W.A.)
- Eremophila pendulina Chinnock (W.A.)
- Eremophila pentaptera J.M.Black (S.A.)
- Eremophila perglandulosa Chinnock (W.A.)
- Eremophila petrophila Chinnock (W.A.)
- Eremophila phillipsii F.Muell. (W.A.)
- Eremophila phyllopoda Chinnock (W.A.)
- Eremophila physocalyx Chinnock (W.A.)
- Eremophila pilosa Chinnock (W.A.)
- Eremophila pinnatifida Chinnock (W.A.)
- Eremophila platycalyx Chinnock (W.A.)
- Eremophila platythamnos Chinnock – desert foxglove (N.T., S.A., W.A.)
- Eremophila polyclada F.Muell. – twiggy emu-bush (N.S.W., N.T., Qld., S.A., Vic.)
- Eremophila praecox Chinnock (S.A., W.A.)
- Eremophila prolata Chinnock (W.A.)
- Eremophila prostrata Chinnock (N.T..)
- Eremophila psilocalyx F.Muell. (W.A.)
- Eremophila pterocarpa W.Fitzg. – wing-fruited eremophila, silver poverty bush (W.A.)
- Eremophila punctata Chinnock (W.A.)
- Eremophila pungens Chinnock (W.A.)
- Eremophila punicea S.Moore – crimson eremophila (W.A.)
- Eremophila purpurascens Chinnock – purple eremophila (W.A.)
- Eremophila pusilliflora Buirchell & A.P.Br. (W.A.)
- Eremophila pustulata S.Moore – blistered eremophila (W.A.)
- Eremophila racemosa (Endl.) F.Muell. – showy eremophila (W.A.)
- Eremophila ramiflora Dell (W.A.)
- Eremophila recurva Chinnock (W.A.)
- Eremophila regia Buirchell & A.P.Br. (W.A.)
- Eremophila resiliens Buirchell & A.P.Br. (W.A.)
- Eremophila resinosa (Endl.) F.Muell. – resinous eremophila (W.A.)
- Eremophila reticulata Chinnock (W.A.)
- Eremophila retropila Chinnock (W.A.)
- Eremophila revoluta Chinnock (W.A.)
- Eremophila rhegos Chinnock (W.A.)
- Eremophila rigens Chinnock (W.A.)
- Eremophila rigida Chinnock (W.A.)
- Eremophila rostrata Chinnock (W.A.)
- Eremophila rotundifolia F.Muell. (S.A., N.T.)
- Eremophila rugosa Chinnock (W.A.)
- Eremophila saligna (S.Moore) C.A.Gardner – willowy eremophila (W.A.)
- Eremophila santalina (F.Muell.) F.Muell. (W.A.)
- Eremophila sargentii (S.Moore) Chinnock (W.A.)
- Eremophila scaberula W.Fitzg. – rough emu bush (W.A.)
- Eremophila scoparia (R.Br.) F.Muell. – silver emu bush, broom bush (W.A.)
- Eremophila scrobiculata Buirchell & A.P.Br. (W.A.)
- Eremophila sericea * A.P.Br. (W.A.)
- Eremophila serpens Chinnock – snake eremophila (W.A.)
- Eremophila serrulata (A.Cunn. ex A.DC.) Druce – serrate-leaved eremophila (N.S.W., N.T., S.A., W.A.)
- Eremophila setacea Chinnock (W.A.)
- Eremophila shonae Chinnock (W.A.)
- Eremophila simulans Chinnock (W.A.)
- Eremophila spathulata W.Fitzg. – spoon-leaved eremophila (W.A.)
- Eremophila spectabilis C.A.Gardner – showy poverty bush (W.A.)
- Eremophila spinescens Chinnock – spiny poverty bush (W.A.)
- Eremophila splendens Chinnock (W.A.)
- Eremophila spongiocarpa Chinnock (W.A.)
- Eremophila spuria Chinnock (W.A.)
- Eremophila stenophylla Chinnock (Qld.)
- Eremophila strongylophylla F.Muell. (W.A.)
- Eremophila sturtii R.Br. – scented sandalwood (N.S.W., N.T., Qld., S.A., Vic., W.A.)
- Eremophila subangustifolia * A.P.Br. & T.M.Llorens (W.A.)
- Eremophila subfloccosa Benth. – dense-felted eremophila (S.A., W.A.)
- Eremophila subteretifolia Chinnock - Lake King eremophila (W.A.)
- Eremophila succinea Chinnock (W.A.)
- Eremophila tenella Chinnock (W.A.)
- Eremophila ternifolia Chinnock – Wongan eremophila (W.A.)
- Eremophila tetraptera C.T.White (Qld.)
- Eremophila tietkensii F.Muell. & Tate (N.T., W.A.)
- Eremophila undulata Chinnock – wavy-leaved eremophila (W.A.)
- Eremophila veneta Chinnock – metallic-flowered eremophila (W.A.)
- Eremophila vernicosa Chinnock (W.A.)
- Eremophila veronica (S.Moore)|C.A.Gardner - Veronica-like eremophila (W.A.)
- Eremophila verrucosa Chinnock (S.A., W.A.)
- Eremophila verticillata Chinnock – whorled eremophila (W.A.)
- Eremophila victoriae Buirchell & A.P.Br. (W.A.)
- Eremophila virens – Campion eremophila
- Eremophila viscida C.A.Gardner – varnish bush (W.A.)
- Eremophila viscimarginata Chinnock (W.A.)
- Eremophila warnesii Chinnock (W.A.)
- Eremophila weldii F.Muell. (S.A., W.A.)
- Eremophila willsii F.Muell. (N.T., Qld., S.A., W.A.)
- Eremophila woodiae Edginton (Qld.)
- Eremophila xantholaema * R.W.Davis
- Eremophila yinnetharrensis Buirchell & A.P.Br. (W.A.)
- Eremophila youngii F.Muell. (W.A.)
