= Eremophila spongiocarpa =

Conservation status
- Priority Three — Poorly Known Taxa (DEC)

Scientific classification
- Kingdom: Plantae
- Clade: Embryophytes
- Clade: Tracheophytes
- Clade: Spermatophytes
- Clade: Angiosperms
- Clade: Eudicots
- Clade: Asterids
- Order: Lamiales
- Family: Scrophulariaceae
- Genus: Eremophila
- Species: E. spongiocarpa

Binomial name
- Eremophila spongiocarpa Chinnock

Species of flowering plant

Eremophila spongiocarpa is a flowering plant in the figwort family, Scrophulariaceae and is endemic to Western Australia. It is a compact shrub with many tangled branches, flattened, succulent leaves, hairy sepals and creamy white petals which are spotted red on the inside.

== Description ==
Eremophila spongiocarpa is a compact, densely-branched shrub which grows to a height of between 0.5 and 1.0 m (2 and 3 ft). It has stiff, hairy, sometimes spiny branches which become glabrous as they age. The leaves are arranged alternately along the branches and are flattened, fleshy, narrow lance-shaped, mostly 12–24 mm (0.5–0.9 in) long, 1.8–4 mm (0.07–0.2 in) wide and covered with a layer of fine hairs.

The flowers are borne singly in leaf axils on hairy stalks 3.5–6.5 mm (0.1–0.3 in) long. There are 5 green, overlapping, egg-shaped, densely hairy sepals which are 3–5.5 mm (0.1–0.2 in) long. The petals are 10–15 mm (0.39–0.59 in) long and are joined at their lower end to form a tube. The petal tube is white to creamy-white and has red spots inside the tube. The outside of the petal tube and its lobes are densely hairy but the inside surface of the lobes is mostly glabrous apart from the middle part of the lower lobe. The inner part of the tube is hairy, especially on the lower surface. Two of the 4 stamens extend beyond the end of the petal tube whilst the other 2 are enclosed. Flowering mainly occurs between June and August and is followed by fruits which are dry, nearly spherical, 8–10 mm (0.3–0.4 in) in diameter, very hairy with a spongy covering.

== Taxonomy and naming ==
Eremophila spongiocarpa was first formally described by Robert Chinnock in 2007 and the description was published in Eremophila and Allied Genera: A Monograph of the Plant Family Myoporaceae. The specific epithet is from the Latin spongiocarpa, 'spongy fruit'.

== Distribution and habitat ==
This eremophila is only known from a small area around a large seasonal marsh northwest of Newman in the Pilbara biogeographic region.

== Conservation ==
Eremophila spongiocarpa is classified as "Priority Three" by the Government of Western Australia Department of Biodiversity, Conservation and Attractions, meaning that it is poorly known and known from only a few locations but is not under imminent threat.
