= Eremophila congesta =

Conservation status
- Priority One — Poorly Known Taxa (DEC)

Scientific classification
- Kingdom: Plantae
- Clade: Embryophytes
- Clade: Tracheophytes
- Clade: Spermatophytes
- Clade: Angiosperms
- Clade: Eudicots
- Clade: Asterids
- Order: Lamiales
- Family: Scrophulariaceae
- Genus: Eremophila
- Species: E. congesta

Binomial name
- Eremophila congesta Chinnock

Species of flowering plant

Eremophila congesta is a flowering plant in the figwort family, Scrophulariaceae and is endemic to a small area in central areas of Western Australia. It is a grey-coloured shrub with crowded, hairy leaves and lilac-coloured flowers which are white inside.

== Description ==
Eremophila congesta is an upright, densely branched shrub growing to a height of 1.3 m (4 ft), with its branches and leaves covered with fine grey hairs. The branches are also rough due to the raised leaf bases. The leaves are crowded and erect so that they obscure the branches. They are also thick, linear in shape, mostly 12–23 mm (0.5–0.9 in) long, 1–2.5 mm (0.04–0.1 in) wide and have thickened edges.

The flowers are borne singly in leaf axils on very short stalks. There are 5 lance-shaped, very hairy, green to red sepals, mostly 10–18 mm (0.4–0.7 in) long. The petals are 20–25 mm (0.8–1 in) long and joined at their lower end to form a tube. The petal tube is purple, lilac or mauve and white inside with a few purple spots. The tube is mostly glabrous on the outside and filled with woolly hairs inside. The 4 stamens are fully enclosed in the petal tube. Flowering occurs mostly from August to September.

== Taxonomy and naming ==
The species was first formally described by Robert Chinnock in 2007 and the description was published in Eremophila and Allied Genera: A Monograph of the Plant Family Myoporaceae. The type specimen was collected in 1958 by the plant illustrator, Nathaniel Henry Speck, about 10 km (6 mi) north of Wiluna. The specific epithet (congesta) is a Latin word meaning "collected", "dense" or "thick", referring to the crowded leaves of this species.

== Distribution and habitat ==
This eremophila occurs in the Wiluna area in the Murchison biogeographic region where it grows on lateritic slopes on low hills and slopes, sometimes in dense colonies.

== Conservation status ==
Eremophila congesta is classified as "Priority One" by the Government of Western Australia Department of Parks and Wildlife, meaning that it is known from only one or a few locations which are potentially at risk.

== Use in horticulture ==
The crowded, silvery-grey foliage and pale to deep lilac-coloured flowers are features of this eremophila. It has been propagated by grafting on to Myoporum and grows best in well-drained soils in a sunny position. It is drought resistant but sensitive to frost.
