= Eremophila humilis =

Conservation status
- Priority One — Poorly Known Taxa (DEC)

Scientific classification
- Kingdom: Plantae
- Clade: Embryophytes
- Clade: Tracheophytes
- Clade: Spermatophytes
- Clade: Angiosperms
- Clade: Eudicots
- Clade: Asterids
- Order: Lamiales
- Family: Scrophulariaceae
- Genus: Eremophila
- Species: E. humilis

Binomial name
- Eremophila humilis Chinnock

Species of plant endemic to Western Australia

Eremophila humilis is a flowering plant in the figwort family, Scrophulariaceae and is endemic to Western Australia. It is a low, rounded shrub with club-shaped leaves and white bell-shaped flowers and which is only found in a restricted area near Meekatharra.

== Description ==
Eremophila humilis is a rounded, densely-branched, dark green shrub which grows to a height of between 0.25 and 0.5 m (0.8 and 2 ft) with branches and leaves that are sticky and shiny when young. The leaves are crowded near the ends of the branches and are mostly 3–10 mm (0.1–0.4 in) long, about 1 mm (0.04 in) wide, linear to club-shaped and lumpy due to enlarged resin glands.

The flowers are borne singly in leaf axils on a mostly hairy stalk 4–7 mm (0.2–0.3 in) long. There are 5 green to purple, elliptic to egg-shaped, pointed sepals which are 6–9.5 mm (0.2–0.4 in) long. The petals are white, 6–8 mm (0.2–0.3 in) long and are joined at their lower end to form a bell-shaped tube. The outside of the tube and petal lobes are slightly hairy but the inside is glabrous. The 4 stamens extend beyond the end of the petal tube. Flowering occurs from June to September and is followed by fruits which are dry, woody, oval-shaped and 4–4.5 mm (0.16–0.18 in) long.

== Taxonomy and naming ==
The species was first formally described by Robert Chinnock in 2007 and the description was published in Eremophila and Allied Genera: A Monograph of the Plant Family Myoporaceae. The specific epithet (humilis) is a Latin word meaning "low" or "small" (usually in stature) referring to the habit of this species.

== Distribution and habitat ==
Eremophila humilis grows in clay loam on stony hills near Mount Vernon, north west of Meekatharra in the Gascoyne biogeographic region.

== Conservation status ==
Eremophila humilis is classified as "Priority One" by the Government of Western Australia Department of Parks and Wildlife, meaning that it is known from only one or a few locations which are potentially at risk.
