= Eremophila arenaria =

Scientific classification
- Kingdom: Plantae
- Clade: Tracheophytes
- Clade: Angiosperms
- Clade: Eudicots
- Clade: Asterids
- Order: Lamiales
- Family: Scrophulariaceae
- Genus: Eremophila
- Species: E. arenaria

Binomial name
- Eremophila arenaria Chinnock

Species of plant

Eremophila arenaria is a plant in the figwort family, Scrophulariaceae and is endemic to arid parts of central Australia. It is a small shrub with purple flowers and is thought to grow only on sand dunes in South Australia, the Northern Territory and Western Australia.

== Description ==
Eremophila arenaria is a small shrub which grows to a maximum height of 1–2 m (3–7 ft) and about the same width. It has many resin glands on the branches and leaves, making them very sticky bright green and glossy. The leaves are arranged alternately, usually 10.5–19.5 mm (0.4–0.8 in) long, 1.5–3.5 mm (0.06–0.1 in) wide, linear to narrow egg-shaped with a curved, narrow, pointed tip.

The flowers are borne singly in leaf axils on stalks 5.5–8 mm (0.2–0.3 in) long which are also sticky and shiny. There are 5 slightly overlapping, egg-shaped, green or purplish, resin-covered sepals which differ slightly in size but are about 7–11 mm (0.3–0.4 in) long. The 5 petals are 17–26 mm (0.7–1 in) long, and are joined at their bases to form a tube. The petal tube is purple with black streaks and the inside of the tube is hairy. There are four stamens which do not extend beyond the end of the tube. Flowering occurs between August and September and is followed by fruit which is dry, hairy, flattened oval in shape and about 6 mm (0.2 in) long.

== Taxonomy and naming ==
Eremophila arenaria was first formally described by Robert Chinnock in 2007 and the description was published in Eremophila and allied genera : a monograph of the plant family Myoporaceae. The type specimen was collected about 14 kilometres (9 mi) north-west of Krewinkel Hill. The specific epithet (arenaria) is derived from the "Latin arenaria, growing on sand".

== Distribution and habitat ==
This eremophila occurs in the south-western corner of the Northern Territory, the far north-west of South Australia and the eastern part of Western Australian in the Great Victoria Desert biogeographic region where it grows on sand dunes.

== Conservation status ==
Eremophila arenaria is classified as "data deficient" by the Government of the Northern Territory and as "not threatened" by the Government of Western Australia Department of Parks and Wildlife.

== Use in horticulture ==
Reflecting its natural habitat, this species needs well-drained soil, prefers full sun and can survive long periods without water. It is also very frost tolerant. It is usually grown from cuttings but needs to be grafted onto Myoporum if not to be grown in sand.
