= Eremophila yinnetharrensis =

Conservation status
- Priority One — Poorly Known Taxa (DEC)

Scientific classification
- Kingdom: Plantae
- Clade: Embryophytes
- Clade: Tracheophytes
- Clade: Spermatophytes
- Clade: Angiosperms
- Clade: Eudicots
- Clade: Asterids
- Order: Lamiales
- Family: Scrophulariaceae
- Genus: Eremophila
- Species: E. yinnetharrensis

Binomial name
- Eremophila yinnetharrensis Buirchell & A.P.Br.

Synonyms
- Eremophila sp. 'Yinnetharra'

Species of flowering plant

Eremophila yinnetharrensis is a species of flowering plant in the family Scrophulariaceae and is endemic to a restricted area of Western Australia. It is an erect, wispy shrub with sessile, lance-shaped leaves with the narrower end towards the base and purple flowers. It is only known from near Yinnetharra Station in the Gascoyne region.

== Description ==
Eremophila yinnetharrensis is an erect, wispy shrub that typically grows to a height of 1.5–3 m (4 ft 11 in – 9 ft 10 in) and 1.5–4 m (4 ft 11 in – 13 ft 1 in) wide. Its branches are grey and densely covered with branched hairs. The leaves are arranged alternately, sessile, lance-shaped with the narrower end towards the base, 4–13 mm (0.16–0.51 in) long and 1–4 mm (0.039–0.157 in) wide. The flowers are borne singly in leaf axils on a pedicel 8–11 mm (0.31–0.43 in) long. There are five elliptic purple sepals that are 9–14 mm (0.35–0.55 in) long and 2.5–4 mm (0.098–0.157 in) wide and densely covered with branched hairs. The petal tube is purple, 18–25 mm (0.71–0.98 in) long and lacks spots. The four stamens are enclosed in the petal tube. Flowering mainly occurs from June to September but also at other times after rainfall.

== Taxonomy and naming ==
This species was first formally described in 2016 by Bevan Buirchell and Andrew Phillip Brown in the journal Nuytsia from specimens collected by Joff Start from Yinnetharra Station in 2005. The specific epithet (yinnetharrensis) is a reference to Yinnetharra Station where the species was first found.

== Distribution and habitat ==
Eremophila yinnetharrensis is only known from the type location where it grows on stony rises in the Gascoyne biogeographic region.

== Conservation ==
Eremophila scrobiculata classified as "Priority One" by the Government of Western Australia Department of Parks and Wildlife, meaning that it is known from only one or a few locations which are potentially at risk.
