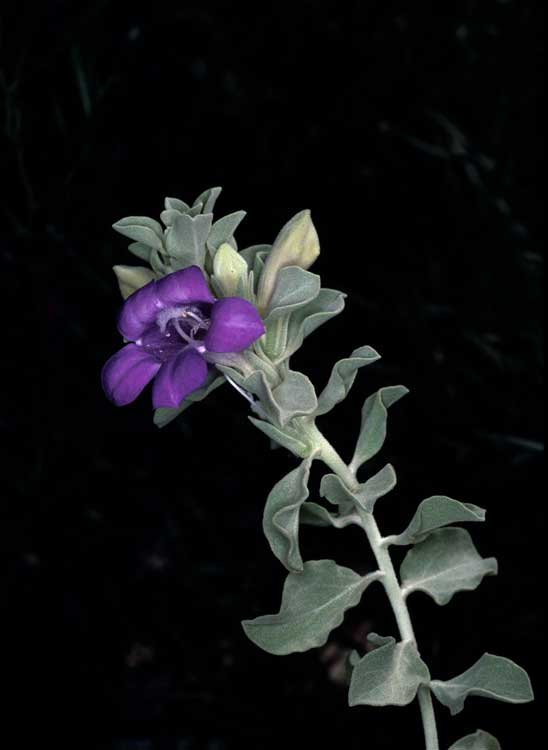

Scientific classification
- Kingdom: Plantae
- Clade: Embryophytes
- Clade: Tracheophytes
- Clade: Spermatophytes
- Clade: Angiosperms
- Clade: Eudicots
- Clade: Asterids
- Order: Lamiales
- Family: Scrophulariaceae
- Genus: Eremophila
- Species: E. macgillivrayi

Binomial name
- Eremophila macgillivrayi J.M.Black

= Eremophila macgillivrayi =

Dog bush

Species of plant

Eremophila macgillivrayi , also known as dog bush, is a flowering plant in the figwort family, Scrophulariaceae and is endemic to Australia. It is a shrub with grey foliage, clustered leaves and red, sometimes yellow flowers. The leaf base is twisted so that the leaf surface is usually close to vertical. It only occurs near the border between South Australia and Queensland.

== Description ==
Eremophila macgillivrayi is an erect shrub growing to a height of 1–3 m (3–10 ft) which has grey foliage due to most of the above-ground parts being covered with a layer of fine, tangled, greyish hairs. The leaf bases on the branches extend down the branch and the bases are twisted through 90° so that the leaf surface is more or less vertical. The leaves are crowded near the ends of the branches, narrow lance-shaped to sickle-shaped, have a distinct mid-vein on the lower surface and are mostly 32–52 mm (1–2 in) long and 4–6 mm (0.16–0.24 in) wide. The leaves are covered with a layer of branched grey hairs.

The flowers are borne singly in leaf axils on a hairy stalk usually 14–18 mm (0.6–0.7 in) long. There are 5 hairy, lance-shaped sepals which are mostly 4–9 mm (0.2–0.4 in) long but which enlarge after flowering. The petals are mostly 25–40 mm (1–2 in) long and are joined at their lower end to form a tube. The petal tube is red, or occasionally yellow, and is hairy on both its inner and outer surfaces. The 4 stamens extend beyond the end of the petal tube. Flowering mainly occurs in July and August and is followed by fruits which are woody, oval-shaped to cone-shaped with a papery covering and are usually 10–15 mm (0.4–0.6 in) long.

== Taxonomy and naming ==
The species was first formally described by botanist John McConnell Black in 1926 and the description was published in Transactions and Proceedings of the Royal Society of South Australia. The specific epithet (macgillivrayi) honours Doctor William David Kerr Macgillivray of Broken Hill who collected the type specimen.

== Distribution and habitat ==
Dog bush is only known from the extreme north east of South Australia and the far south west of Queensland where it usually grows on stony flats or near rocky creek beds. There is one record from north western New South Wales.

== Use in horticulture ==
The silvery-grey foliage of this eremophila make it a useful contrast with green-leaved species in the garden, with its dusky red flowers adding to the display. It can be propagated from cuttings, sometimes with difficulty and grafting onto Myoporum rootstock is often used, especially in southern Australia or when the plant is to be grown in heavier soils. It is a hardy shrub which requires well-drained soil when grown on its own roots and is both drought and frost tolerant.
