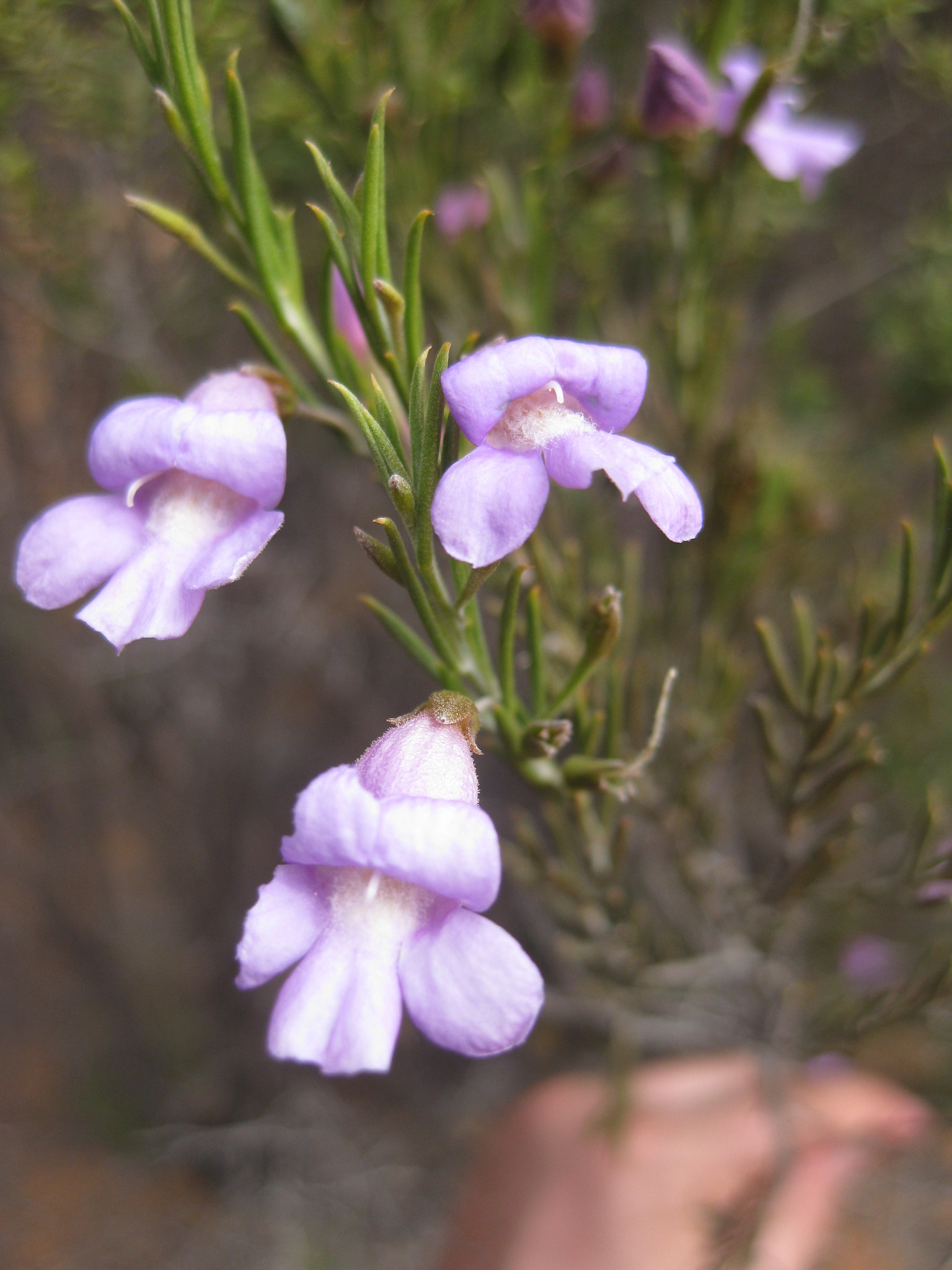

Conservation status
- Priority One — Poorly Known Taxa (DEC)

Scientific classification
- Kingdom: Plantae
- Clade: Tracheophytes
- Clade: Angiosperms
- Clade: Eudicots
- Clade: Asterids
- Order: Lamiales
- Family: Scrophulariaceae
- Genus: Eremophila
- Species: E. hamulata

Binomial name
- Eremophila hamulata Buirchell & A.P.Br.

= Eremophila hamulata =

Species of plant endemic to Western Australia

Eremophila hamulata is a species of flowering plant in the figwort family, Scrophulariaceae and is endemic to Western Australia. It is an erect, woody shrub with sticky branches, narrow, hooked leaves and hairy mauve-purple flowers.

== Description ==
Eremophila hamulata is an erect, woody shrub growing to about 1–2 m (40–80 in) tall and wide. The leaves are arranged alternately, scattered along the branches, more or less needle-shaped, 12–22 mm (0.5–0.9 in) long and about 1 mm (0.04 in) wide with a hooked end. The flowers are borne singly in leaf axils on a stalk 12–15 mm (0.5–0.6 in) long which is hairy near its base. There are five overlapping lance-shaped, sticky green sepals 5–7 mm (0.2–0.3 in) long and 1–2 mm (0.04–0.08 in) wide. The petals are mauve-purple, 10–20 mm (0.4–0.8 in) long and joined at their lower end to form a flattened, bell-shaped tube which is hairy on the outside and has a tuft of hairs inside. The four stamens are enclosed by the petal tube. Flowering time is mainly from August to October.

== Taxonomy and naming ==
Eremophila hamulata was first formally described by Bevan Buirchell and Andrew Brown in 2016 and the description was published in Nuytsia. The specific epithet (hamulata) is derived from the Latin word hamatus meaning "with hooks" or "hooked", referring to the hooked end of the leaves.

== Distribution and habitat ==
This eremophila is found in scattered locations between McDermid Rock and Boorabbin Rock in the Coolgardie biogeographic region usually growing near granite outcrops or near creeks in woodland.

== Conservation status ==
Eremophila hamulata has been classified as "Priority One" by the Government of Western Australia Department of Parks and Wildlife, meaning that it is known from only one or a few locations which are potentially at risk.
