= Eremophila grandiflora =

Conservation status
- Priority Three — Poorly Known Taxa (DEC)

Scientific classification
- Kingdom: Plantae
- Clade: Embryophytes
- Clade: Tracheophytes
- Clade: Spermatophytes
- Clade: Angiosperms
- Clade: Eudicots
- Clade: Asterids
- Order: Lamiales
- Family: Scrophulariaceae
- Genus: Eremophila
- Species: E. grandiflora

Binomial name
- Eremophila grandiflora A.P.Br. & Buirchell

Species of plant

Eremophila grandiflora is a flowering plant in the figwort family, Scrophulariaceae and is endemic to Western Australia. It is a large shrub with shiny leaves and the largest flowers in its genus and is only known from a restricted area near Paynes Find.

== Description ==
Eremophila grandiflora is a shrub growing to 3 metres (10 ft) high and 4 metres (10 ft) wide with branches that are sticky and shiny due to a thick layer of resin. The branches are also covered with small raised glands and the younger branches are hairy. The leaves are arranged alternately with stalks 15–25 mm (0.6–1 in) long, and blades that are 42–92 mm (2–4 in) long, 8–14 mm (0.3–0.6 in) wide, elliptic to lance-shaped and usually sticky with resin.

The flowers are usually borne singly in leaf axils on a flattened, hairy stalk 25–35 mm (0.98–1.4 in) long. There are 5 overlapping, pale reddish-pink, elliptic, pointed sepals which differ in size from each other but are 30–48 mm (1–2 in) long. The petals are 52–68 mm (2–3 in) long and joined at their lower end to form a tube. The tube is brown with darker markings with spreading petal lobes that are pale lilac-blue to almost white, with purple or brown spots near their bases and inside the tube. The outside of the tube and petal lobes is hairy while the inside is mostly glabrous. The 4 stamens extend beyond the end of the tube. Flowering occurs from June to early September.

== Taxonomy and naming ==
The species was first formally described by Andrew Brown and Bevan Buirchell in 2007 and the description was published in Nuytsia. The specific epithet (grandiflora) is from Latin words meaning "great" or "large" and "-flowered".

== Distribution and habitat ==
Eremophila grandiflora is common in a small area near Paynes Find in the Yalgoo biogeographic region where it grows in stony clay soils along drainage lines and slopes.

== Conservation status ==
This species is classified as "Priority Three" by the Government of Western Australia Department of Parks and Wildlife, meaning that it is poorly known and known from only a few locations but is not under imminent threat.
