= Eremophila victoriae =

Conservation status
- Priority One — Poorly Known Taxa (DEC)

Scientific classification
- Kingdom: Plantae
- Clade: Embryophytes
- Clade: Tracheophytes
- Clade: Spermatophytes
- Clade: Angiosperms
- Clade: Eudicots
- Clade: Asterids
- Order: Lamiales
- Family: Scrophulariaceae
- Genus: Eremophila
- Species: E. victoriae

Binomial name
- Eremophila victoriae Buirchell & A.P.Br.

Species of flowering plant

Eremophila victoriae is small shrub with sessile, egg-shaped leaves and purple flowers and that is endemic to Western Australia. It is only known from two populations in the Great Victoria Desert.

== Description ==
Eremophila victoriae is a shrub that typically grows to 40–50 cm (16–20 in) high and 40–75 cm (16–30 in) wide. Its branches are grey and covered with glandular hairs. The leaves are arranged alternately, sessile, sticky, egg-shaped with thickened edges, 3–4 mm (0.12–0.16 in) long and 2–3 mm (0.079–0.118 in) wide. The flowers are borne singly in leaf axils on a pedicel 4–5 mm (0.16–0.20 in) long that is covered with glandular hairs. There are five lance-shaped to egg-shaped, brownish green sepals that are 5–8 mm (0.20–0.31 in) long, 3–3.5 mm (0.12–0.14 in) wide and partly covered with glandular hairs. The petal tube is purple, 10–20 mm (0.39–0.79 in) long, covered with glandular hairs on the outside but glabrous inside. The four stamens are enclosed in the petal tube with glandular hairs on the filaments. Flowering mainly occurs from August to October but also at other times after rainfall.

== Taxonomy and naming ==
This species was first formally described in 2016 by Bevan Buirchell and Andrew Phillip Brown in the journal Nuytsia from specimens collected in the Great Victoria Desert in 2010. The specific epithet (victoriae) is a reference to the type location.

== Distribution and habitat ==
Eremophila victoriae is only known from two populations in the Great Victoria Desert where it grows in mulga country.

== Conservation ==
Eremophila victoriae classified as "Priority One" by the Government of Western Australia Department of Parks and Wildlife, meaning that it is known from only one or a few locations which are potentially at risk.
