= Eremophila ballythunnensis =

Conservation status
- Priority One — Poorly Known Taxa (DEC)

Scientific classification
- Kingdom: Plantae
- Clade: Tracheophytes
- Clade: Angiosperms
- Clade: Eudicots
- Clade: Asterids
- Order: Lamiales
- Family: Scrophulariaceae
- Genus: Eremophila
- Species: E. ballythunnensis

Binomial name
- Eremophila ballythunnensis Buirchell & A.P.Br.

Species of flowering plant

Eremophila ballythunnensis is a flowering plant in the figwort family, Scrophulariaceae and is endemic to Western Australia. It is a small, spreading shrub with narrow oval leaves and mauve-purple flowers with densely hairy sepals.

== Description ==
Eremophila ballythunnensis is a small, spreading shrub growing to 10–20 cm (4–8 in) high and 25–40 cm (10–20 in) wide. The leaves are arranged alternately, grey-green in colour, narrow oval in shape, 4–12 mm (0.2–0.5 in) long and 2–5 mm (0.08–0.2 in) wide. The flowers are borne singly in leaf axils on a hairy stalk 5–7 mm (0.2–0.3 in) long. There are 5 lance-shaped, densely hairy green sepals which age to a burgundy colour and are 8–12 mm (0.3–0.5 in) long and 2–3 mm (0.08–0.1 in) wide. The petals are purple, 14–20 mm (0.6–0.8 in) long and joined at their lower end to form a flattened, bell-shaped tube which is glabrous inside and out. The 4 stamens are enclosed by the petal tube. Flowering time is mainly from June to August.

== Taxonomy and naming ==
Eremophila ballythunnensis was first formally described by Bevan Buirchell and Andrew Brown in 2016 and the description was published in Nuytsia. The specific epithet (ballythunnensis) refers to "Ballythunna" Station where it was first seen.

== Distribution and habitat ==
This eremophila is found in the Murchison biogeographic region growing in shallow soil on rocky quartzite hills with Acacia and other Eremophila species.

== Conservation status ==
Eremophila ballythunnensis has been classified as "Priority One" by the Government of Western Australia Department of Parks and Wildlife, meaning that it is known from only one or a few locations which are potentially at risk.
