= Robert Chinnock =

Australian botanist

Robert J. Chinnock
- Born: 3 July 1943 (age 83); Wellington, New Zealand
- Education: Victoria University of Wellington (MSc, 1971); Flinders University (PhD, 1982)
- Scientific career
- Fields: Botany
- Workplaces: State Herbarium of South Australia
- Thesis: Taxonomy and relations in the Myoporaceae (1982)
- Author abbrev. (botany): Chinnock

Robert James (Bob) Chinnock (born 3 July 1943) is a New Zealand-born Australian botanist who worked at the State Herbarium of South Australia as a senior biologist. He retired in 2008 but still works as an honorary research associate.

His research interests include Eremophila and related genera, the weedy Cactaceae, especially those in the genus Opuntia, and Australian ferns and clubmosses.

His PhD thesis at Flinders University in 1982 was focused upon Myoporaceae,

He is the author of Eremophila and allied genera : a monograph of the plant family Myoporaceae. (Plants in these genera are now included in the family Scrophulariaceae.)

The standard author abbreviation Chinnock is used to indicate this person as the author when citing a botanical name.
