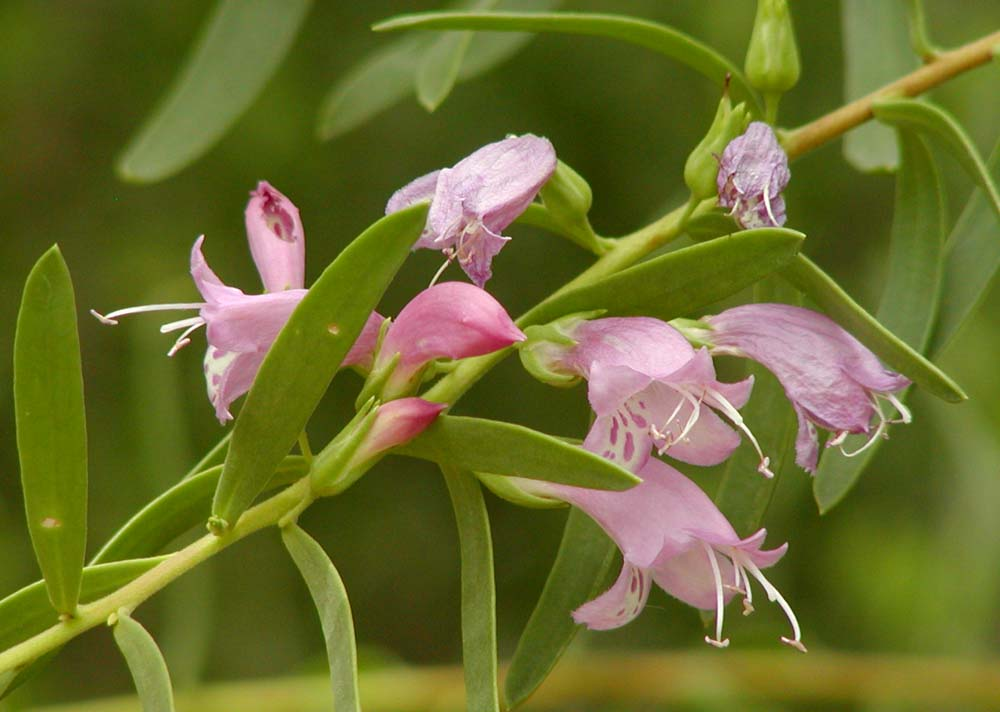
- Eremophila maculata (cultivated) at Desert Demonstration Garden in Las Vegas

Scientific classification
- Kingdom: Plantae
- Clade: Tracheophytes
- Clade: Angiosperms
- Clade: Eudicots
- Clade: Asterids
- Order: Lamiales
- Family: Scrophulariaceae
- Tribe: Myoporeae
- Genus: Eremophila; R.Br.

Species
- See List of Eremophila species

Synonyms
- List: Duttonia F.Muell. nom. illeg.; Eremodendron A.DC.; Eremophila sect. Sentis (F.Muell.) F.Muell.; Exemophila F.Muell. orth. var.; Pholidia R.Br.; Pholidia sect. Sentis F.Muell.; Pholidiopsis F.Muell.; Pseudopholidia A.DC.; Santis Wettst. orth. var.; Sentis F.Muell.; Stenochilus R.Br.

= Eremophila (plant) =

Genus of plants endemic to Australia

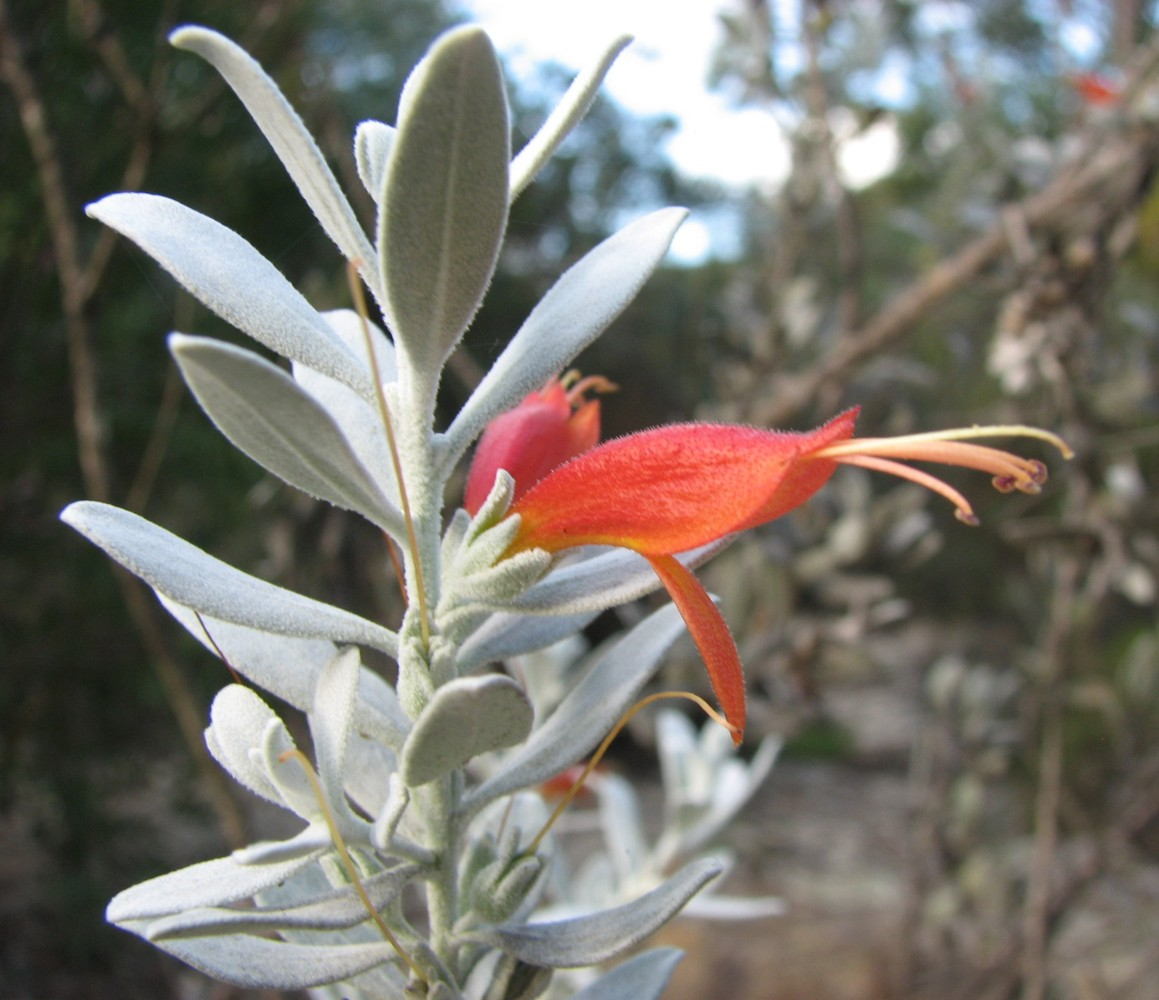
Eremophila glabra 'Murchison Magic'

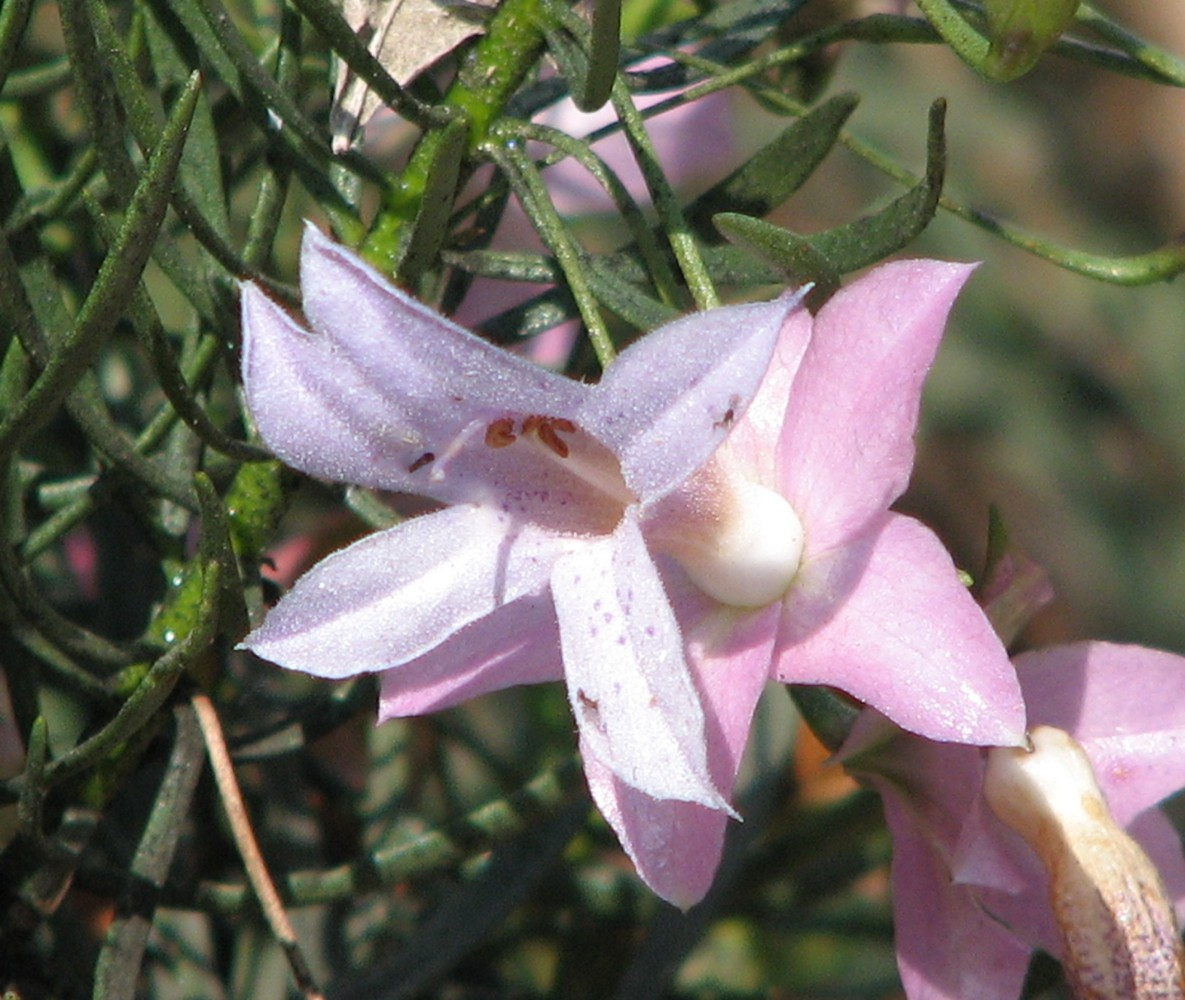
Eremophila abietina

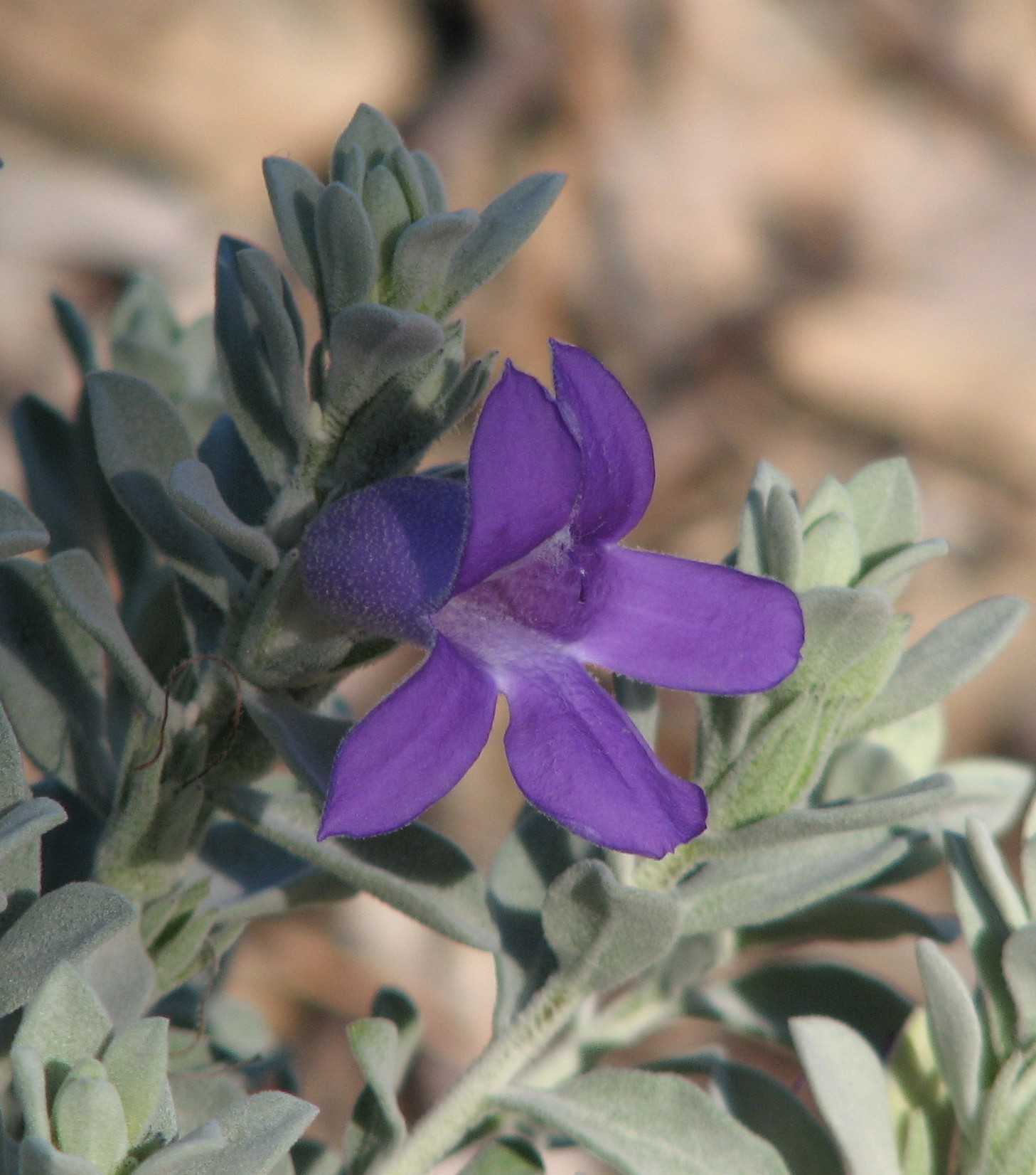
Eremophila hygrophana

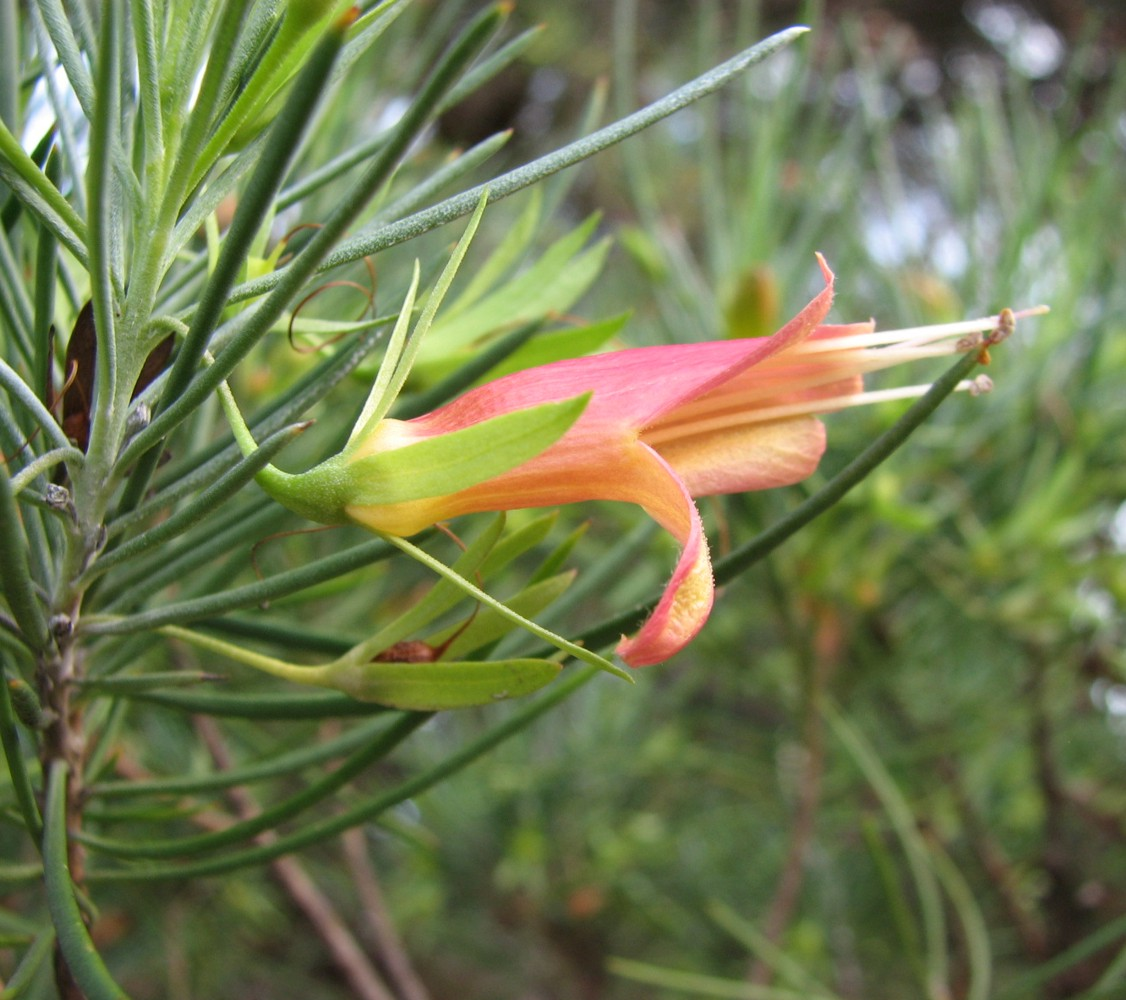
Eremophila oldfieldii

Eremophila is a genus of more than 270 species of plants in the figwort family, Scrophulariaceae, all of which are endemic to mainland Australia. Some species have common names including emu bush, poverty bush or fuchsia bush, reflecting the belief that emus eat the fruit, their arid environment or a superficial resemblance to the flowers of plants in the genus Fuchsia. Eremophilas are widespread in the arid areas of Australia, and range in size from low-growing shrubs to small trees. Although they are found in every mainland state, species richness peaks in Western Australia. The petals are joined, at least at their bases, into a tube with the upper petals different in size and shape from the lower ones.

== Description ==
Eremophilas vary in size and habit from low, prostrate shrubs such as E. serpens to small trees in the case of E. bignoniiflora. Leaf size and shape is also variable but the leaves are usually small and are often shiny or hairy. The flowers usually have 5 spreading sepals and 5 petals which are joined into a tube, at least at the base. The most common flower colours are red, purple, lilac and mauve but others are white and even green. Many species have flowers which have a combination of colours, or have spotted or streaked markings, or both. Sometimes only the petals are coloured but often the sepals are also colourful.

There is variation in flower shape, the most common being two petals at the top of the tube and three below, with the stamens enclosed in the tube as in the case of E. exilifolia. Species with this arrangement are generally insect-pollinated, the lower petals acting as a landing area. Less common are those that have four petal lobes at the top of the flower, one below which is curled under the flower and the stamens extending beyond the petal tube, as in the case of E. glabra. These flowers are generally bird pollinated, the bird holding the plant stem while it visits the flower. A few others have flowers with a combination of these arrangements.

As the flower ages, the corolla falls off, then the calyx enlarges and becomes coloured as the fruit enlarges. The fruits contain from 2 to 12 seeds and may lie dormant in the ground for many years until disturbed by fire, heavy rainfall and sometimes by human activity such as roadworks. Some species such as E. sturtii reproduce by suckering and have become troublesome weeds in some areas. However, many more are rare or threatened by human activities such as land clearing, pastoral activity and mining.

== Taxonomy and naming ==
The genus Eremophila was first formally described in 1810 by the botanist Robert Brown in Prodromus Florae Novae Hollandiae and the first species to be named were E. oppositifolia and E. alternifolia but Brown did not nominate a type species. The Victorian government botanist, Ferdinand von Mueller was the most influential early naturalist to take an interest in the genus and described 47 species, many of which were collected during expeditions to remote areas of Australia. Robert Chinnock is the modern authority who has named more than 100 species of eremophilas but because many species grow in rarely visited places, more remain to be named. So far, 221 species have been described but another 40 have been discovered but not yet described. The most recent additions to the list are Eremophila buirchellii and Eremophila calcicola which were formally described in 2016.

The name Eremophila is derived from the Ancient Greek ἐρῆμος (erêmos) meaning "lonely" or "desert" and φίλος (phílos) meaning “dear" or "beloved” alluding to the species' adaptation to arid environments.

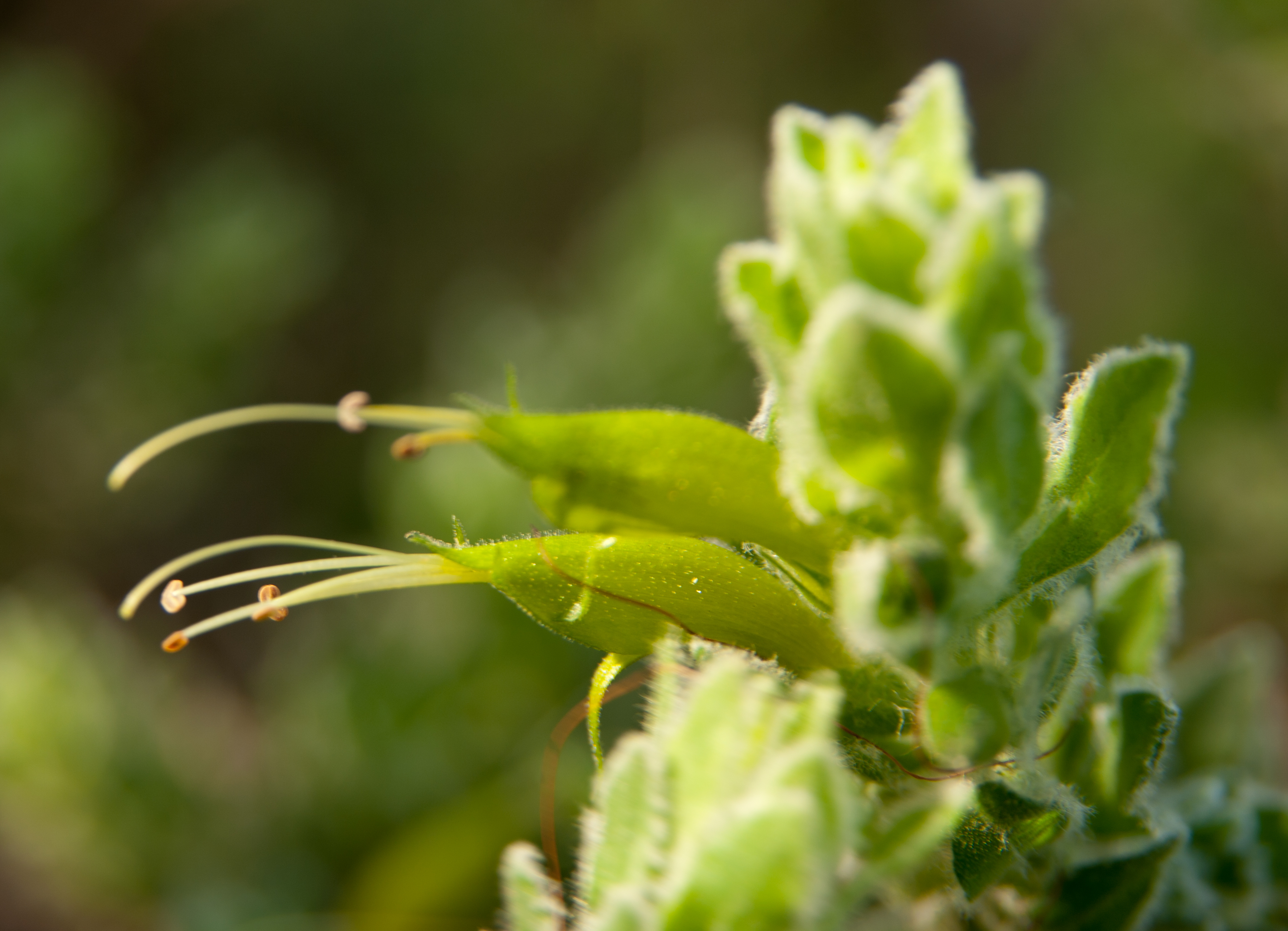
Eremophila subfloccosa

=== Phylogenetic work ===
A comprehensive molecular study was conducted in 2021 to shed light on both the relationships between Eremophila species, and other species in the tribe Myoporeae. The study was conducted with 205 out of the 233 described (as of 2021) species of Eremophila.

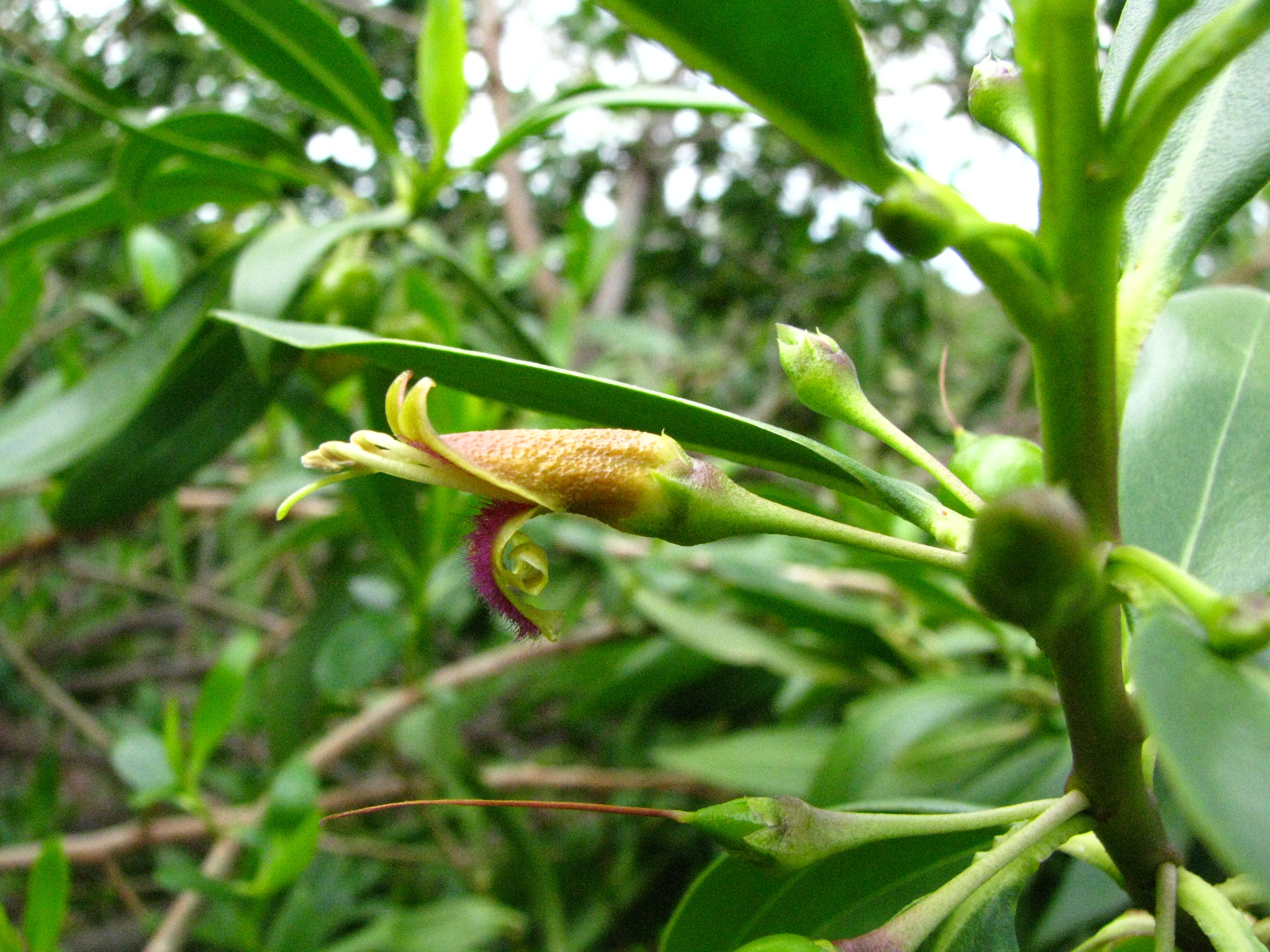
Molecular studies suggest that the monotypic Caribbean species Bontia daphnoides is nested within the genus Eremophila.

The phylogenetic tree produced indicates the presence of four major clades. Additionally, the study provides strong evidence that the entire genus is paraphyletic, with all other genera of tribe Myoporeae nested within it. This includes the genera Myoporum, Bontia, Glycocystis, Pentacoelium, Calamphoreus and Diocirea. Interestingly, despite being native to the Caribbean, the monotypic species Bontia daphnoides is deeply nested within clade C of the tree. While suggestions have been proposed as to how this should be resolved, no action has been taken as of yet.

=== Species list ===
See List of Eremophila species

=== Common names ===
A significant number of eremophilas have the term emu bush or poverty bush as part of their common names, although sometimes two species have the same common name and sometimes one species has more than one common name. Of the approximately 270 species, the following have at least one common name:

Emu bush

E. alternifolia – narrow-leaved emu bush
E. bignoniiflora – gooramurra, bignonia emu bush
E. compacta – compact emu bush
E. divaricata – spreading emu bush
E. elderi – aromatic emu bush
E. gilesii – Charleville turkey bush, green turkey bush, Giles emu bush
E. glabra – common emu bush
E. glutinosa – sticky emu bush
E. hillii – Hill's emu bush
E. lactea – milky emu bush
E. maculata – spotted emu bush
E. polyclada – twiggy emu bush
E. scaberula – rough emu bush
E. scoparia – silver emu bush, broom bush

Poverty bush

E. abietina – spotted poverty bush
E. anomala – Paroo poverty bush
E. attenuata – Connie Sue poverty bush
E. aureivisca – Rason poverty bush
E. battii – Batt's poverty bush
E. bowmanii – Bowman's poverty bush
E. campanulata – bell-flowered poverty bush
E. ciliata – Archer's poverty bush
E. denticulata – toothed poverty bush
E. foliosissima – poverty bush
E. granitica – granite poverty bush, thin-leaved poverty bush
E. maitlandii – Shark Bay poverty bush
E. malacoides – frontage poverty bush
E. margarethae – sandbank poverty bush
E. metallicorum – miners poverty bush
E. micrantha – small-flowered poverty bush
E. parvifolia – small-leaved poverty bush
E. pterocarpa – wing-fruited eremophila, silver poverty bush
E. spectabilis – showy poverty bush
E. spinescens – spiny poverty bush

== Distribution and habitat ==
Eremophilas are distributed across the Australian mainland, primarily in arid regions and the majority of species occur in Western Australia. Eremophila maculata is found in all Australian states but there are no eremophilas in Tasmania. Eremophila debilis is found in New Zealand although its appearance there is thought to be recent, most likely as a result of introduction by people.

At least 229 species are found in Western Australia and about 80% of those are endemic to that state. They are most common in arid areas - in the Meekatharra-Wiluna area there are more than 50 eremophila species and are the most common shrubs encountered. A few species, including E. complanata and E. mirabilis have very restricted distributions and only occur on one or two rocky outcrops.

== Ecology ==
Eremophila includes entomophilous species, with flowers adapted to attract insects, and ornithophilous species, with flowers that attract birds. Entomophilous flowers have protruding lower lips, which provide a landing area for insects, and they are often blue, purple, or white. Bird-adapted flowers are red, orange, yellow, or green, and have lobes pointing downwards which discourages insects. Bird pollinated species also tend to have longer stamens, which brush pollen onto and off the bird's head as it feeds. The fruits are eaten by emus, which disperse the seeds in their droppings although the belief that this aids in the germination of the seeds is mistaken.

Some species of Eremophila, such as E.freelingii and E.latrobei are toxic to stock whereas others, including E.bignoniiflora and E.oppositifolia are useful fodder plants.

== Uses ==
=== Indigenous uses ===
Aboriginal people used eremophilas for cultural and health reasons. For example, the Adnyamathanha people used Varti-varka (Eremophila longifolia) in burial ceremonies and in initiation ceremonies. Skin complaints were treated with a mixture of emu oil and the ash from burned bark of the plant. Research is currently underway by several groups into the phytochemistry of species within this genus, and into the bioactive phytochemical constituents that are thought to be responsible for their therapeutic effects.

=== Use in horticulture ===
Historically eremophilas were not commonly used in horticulture although some species, including Eremophila maculata, were well known. Their rarity in gardens was partly because they were difficult to propagate, had low germination rates or because they were rarely seen, even in nature. As methods of propagating and growing have improved, the popularity of eremophilas has greatly increased. The beauty and abundance of their flowers, variety of foliage and habit, and extended flowering period make them attractive garden plants. They are mostly drought resistant and many also tolerant of frost, allowing them to be grown in most situations. The difficulty of propagating from seed, and also sometimes from cuttings has prevented many species from being commercially available, but most species can be grafted onto rootstock of Myoporum species, giving the added advantage of being able to grow in almost any soil type, including heavy clay. Myoporum insulare, M. montanum and M. acuminatum are suitable, depending on where the plant is to be grown. It is possible to germinate eremophila seeds but the process involves either leaving the fruit in the ground for long periods or removing the seed from the fruit without damaging the seed.

Most eremophila grow in the arid zone of Australia where rainfall is infrequent and are adapted to dealing with long dry spells, even droughts lasting years. Eremophilas are therefore particularly suited to low maintenance gardens, those where water supply is limited or where gardeners want a garden that does not require large volumes of water. In fact, excessive water retention in the soil can kill many species, making cultivation difficult in higher rainfall regions and poorly draining regions of Eastern Australia. Still, eremophilas in a garden setting should be treated similarly to other native plants, with regular watering in the first 1-2 years, and the application of native fertiliser. In a severe drought, some species, such as E. microtheca can lose their leaves and appear to be dead after a long dry period, only to recover and turn into a compact, healthy-looking shrub after a deep watering.

== See also ==
- List of Eremophila (plant) species
