= Eremophila buirchellii =

Conservation status
- Priority Two — Poorly Known Taxa (DEC)

Scientific classification
- Kingdom: Plantae
- Clade: Tracheophytes
- Clade: Angiosperms
- Clade: Eudicots
- Clade: Asterids
- Order: Lamiales
- Family: Scrophulariaceae
- Genus: Eremophila
- Species: E. buirchellii

Binomial name
- Eremophila buirchellii A.P.Br.

Species of flowering plant

Eremophila buirchellii is a flowering plant in the figwort family, Scrophulariaceae and is endemic to the Mount Augustus National Park in Western Australia. It is an erect shrub with densely clustered leaves, pink, bell-shaped flowers and with most parts of the plant covered with greyish, branched hairs.

== Description ==
Eremophila buirchellii is an erect shrub growing to 1–2 m (3–7 ft) high and 0.8–1.2 m (3–4 ft) wide. The branches are densely covered with greyish branched hairs. The leaves are arranged alternately, mostly 10–23 mm (0.4–0.9 in) long, 2.5–5 mm (0.1–0.2 in) wide, lance-shaped with a dense covering of greyish branched hairs and densely clustered at the ends of the branches.

The flowers are borne singly in leaf axils on a stalk 5–7 mm (0.2–0.3 in) long. There are 5 lance-shaped greyish-green to burgundy-coloured sepals which are 7–10 mm (0.3–0.4 in) long, spread outwards and densely covered with branched, greyish hairs. The petals are 8–12 mm (0.3–0.5 in) long and joined at their lower end to form a bell-shaped tube. The inside and outside of the petal tube is pink to pinkish white and lacks spots. The petal tube is usually mostly glabrous except for a few glandular hairs. The 4 stamens are about the same length as the petal tube and are well-spaced. Flowering time is from June to August.

== Taxonomy and naming ==
Eremophila buirchellii was first formally described by Andrew Phillip Brown in 2016 and the description was published in Nuytsia. The specific epithet (buirchellii) honours Bevan Buirchell, the collector of the type specimen and an authority on the genus Eremophila.

== Distribution and habitat ==
This eremophila is only known from Mount Augustus National Park in the Gascoyne biogeographic region where it grows on steep, rocky slopes.

== Conservation status ==
Only about 50 mature plants of this species have been recorded and Eremophila buirchellii (as Eremophila sp. Mt Augustus) has been classified as "Priority Two" by the Western Australian Government Department of Parks and Wildlife meaning that it is poorly known and from only one or a few locations.
