= Eremophila calcicola =

Conservation status
- Priority Two — Poorly Known Taxa (DEC)

Scientific classification
- Kingdom: Plantae
- Clade: Tracheophytes
- Clade: Angiosperms
- Clade: Eudicots
- Clade: Asterids
- Order: Lamiales
- Family: Scrophulariaceae
- Genus: Eremophila
- Species: E. calcicola

Binomial name
- Eremophila calcicola R.W.Davis

Species of flowering plant

Eremophila calcicola is a flowering plant in the figwort family, Scrophulariaceae and is endemic to a small area in the south of Western Australia. It is a low, spreading, short-lived shrub with broad leaves, and pale, greenish-yellow flowers over a long period.

== Description ==
Eremophila calcicola is a spreading shrub growing to 0.8 m (3 ft) high and 2 m (7 ft) wide. The leaves are arranged alternately, mostly 20–80 mm (0.8–3 in) long, 3–15 mm (0.1–0.6 in) wide, elliptic to lance-shaped with a few white hairs. Unlike in some other eremophilas, the leaves are not clustered on the ends of the branches.

The flowers are borne singly in leaf axils on an S-shaped stalk 14–17 mm (0.6–0.7 in) long. There are 5 overlapping, narrow triangular sepals which are 4–5 mm (0.16–0.20 in) long and green with a few hairs. The petals are 14–19 mm (0.6–0.7 in) long, pale yellowish-green and joined at their lower end to form a tube. The tips of the petals are different sizes and are curved backwards. The inside and outside of the petal tube have a few scattered glandular hairs. The 4 stamens are much longer than the petal tube and are paired. Flowering time is from May to October.

== Taxonomy and naming ==
Eremophila calcicola was first formally described by Robert Davis in 2016 and the description was published in Nuytsia. It was formerly known as Eremophila sp. Parmango Road. The specific epithet (calcicola) is derived from the Latin calx meaning "lime" and -cola meaning "dweller" referring to the soil type in which this species grows.

== Distribution and habitat ==
This eremophila is found south of Balladonia in the Mallee biogeographic region where it grows in sandy, calcareous soil in open woodland. It appears in large numbers after bushfire, quickly reaches maturity, produces large number of flowers then dying of old age after a few years.

== Conservation status ==
Eremophila calcicola is classified as "Priority Two" by the Western Australian Government Department of Parks and Wildlife meaning that it is poorly known and from only one or a few locations.
