= Eremophila micrantha =

Scientific classification
- Kingdom: Plantae
- Clade: Embryophytes
- Clade: Tracheophytes
- Clade: Spermatophytes
- Clade: Angiosperms
- Clade: Eudicots
- Clade: Asterids
- Order: Lamiales
- Family: Scrophulariaceae
- Genus: Eremophila
- Species: E. micrantha

Binomial name
- Eremophila micrantha Chinnock

Species of flowering plant

Eremophila micrantha, commonly known as small-flowered poverty bush, is a flowering plant in the figwort family, Scrophulariaceae and is endemic to Western Australia. It is a rounded shrub with many thin, flexible branches, narrow leaves and small white flowers.

== Description ==
Eremophila micrantha is an erect shrub, usually growing to a height of 1–3 m (3–10 ft), with a rounded top and many thin, flexible branches which are covered with glands. The branches are glabrous, yellowish when young and become red-brown as they age. The leaves are arranged alternately along the branches and are linear in shape, taper towards the end, have a rough surface and are mostly 18–25 mm (0.7–1 in) long and 1 mm (0.04 in) wide. They are also yellow-green in colour, covered with small raised lumps and are sticky due to the presence of resin.

The flowers are usually borne singly or in groups of up to 3 in leaf axils on rough, sticky, straight stalks, 2–3.5 mm (0.08–0.1 in) long. There are 5 yellowish-green, lance-shaped, sticky sepals which are mostly 1.6–3 mm (0.06–0.1 in) long. The petals are 5–6.5 mm (0.2–0.3 in) long and are joined at their lower end to form a tube. In bud, the flowers are pinkish but open to white, spotted red on the lower middle petal lobe and spotted yellow inside the tube. The outside surface of the tube is densely hairy while the inside is glabrous. The 4 stamens are fully enclosed in the petal tube. Flowering occurs from September to October and the fruits which follow are oval-shaped with a pointed end, 2.5–4 mm (0.1–0.2 in) long and densely covered with stiff, long hairs.

== Taxonomy and naming ==
The species was first formally described by Robert Chinnock in 2007 and the description was published in Eremophila and Allied Genera: A Monograph of the Plant Family Myoporaceae. The specific epithet (micrantha) is derived from the Ancient Greek μικρός (mikrós) meaning "small" or "little", and ἄνθος (ánthos) meaning "flower", in reference to the small flowers of this species.

== Distribution and habitat ==
Eremophila micrantha occurs between Meekatharra and Newman in the Gascoyne and Murchison biogeographic regions. It grows in shallow stony soil and near the margins of salt pans, often in mulga shrubland.

== Conservation status ==
This species is classified as "not threatened" by the Western Australian Government Department of Parks and Wildlife.

== Use in horticulture ==
Older specimens of this eremophila have very dark trunks, complementing the dark green foliage and tiny white flowers. The small, persistent, white hairy fruits are an added attraction. It can be propagated from seed or with difficulty, by grafting and grows best in a sunny location in well-drained soil. It only needs an occasional watering in long summer droughts and is very tolerant of frosts.
