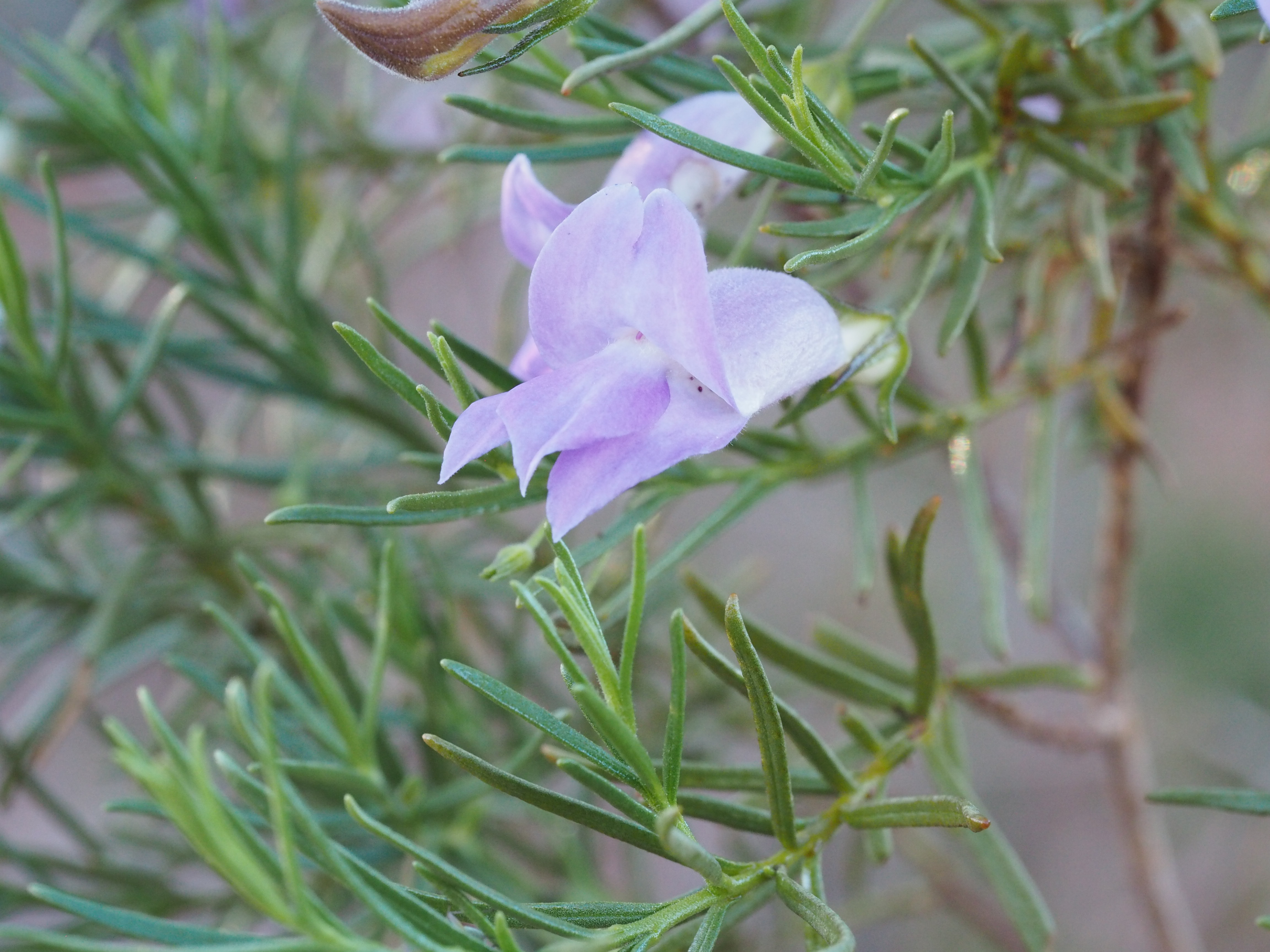
- Eremophila glutinosa leaves and flowers

Scientific classification
- Kingdom: Plantae
- Clade: Embryophytes
- Clade: Tracheophytes
- Clade: Spermatophytes
- Clade: Angiosperms
- Clade: Eudicots
- Clade: Asterids
- Order: Lamiales
- Family: Scrophulariaceae
- Genus: Eremophila
- Species: E. glutinosa

Binomial name
- Eremophila glutinosa Chinnock

= Eremophila glutinosa =

Sticky emu bush

Species of flowering plant

Eremophila glutinosa, commonly known as sticky emu bush, is a flowering plant in the figwort family, Scrophulariaceae and is endemic to Western Australia. It is an erect, densely foliaged shrub with branches and leaves sticky and shiny due to the presence of resin. It has hairy sepals and lilac-coloured flowers.

== Description ==
Eremophila glutinosa is an erect shrub growing to a height of between 0.4 and 3 metres (1 and 10 ft) with branches that are densely covered with glandular hairs that are often obscured by a thick layer of resin. The leaves are mostly 8–20 mm (0.3–0.8 in) long, 0.5–1.5 mm (0.02–0.06 in) wide, densely clustered near the ends of the branches, linear in shape, channelled on the lower surface and covered with resin.

The flowers are borne singly in leaf axils on a sticky, hairy stalk, usually 1.5–6.5 mm (0.06–0.3 in) long. There are 5 overlapping, green, lance-shaped to egg-shaped sepals which are mostly 6–10.5 mm (0.2–0.4 in) long and hairy on both the inner and outer surfaces. The petals are 10–25 mm (0.4–1 in) long and joined at their lower end to form a tube. The tube is a shade of lilac with dark spots inside the tube and on part of the lobes. The outside of the tube is sparsely hairy, the inside of the lobes glabrous and the inside of the tube is densely woolly. The 4 stamens are fully enclosed in the tube. Flowering occurs from June to October and is followed by fruits which are dry, woody, hairy and 4–6 millimetres (0.16–0.24 in) long.

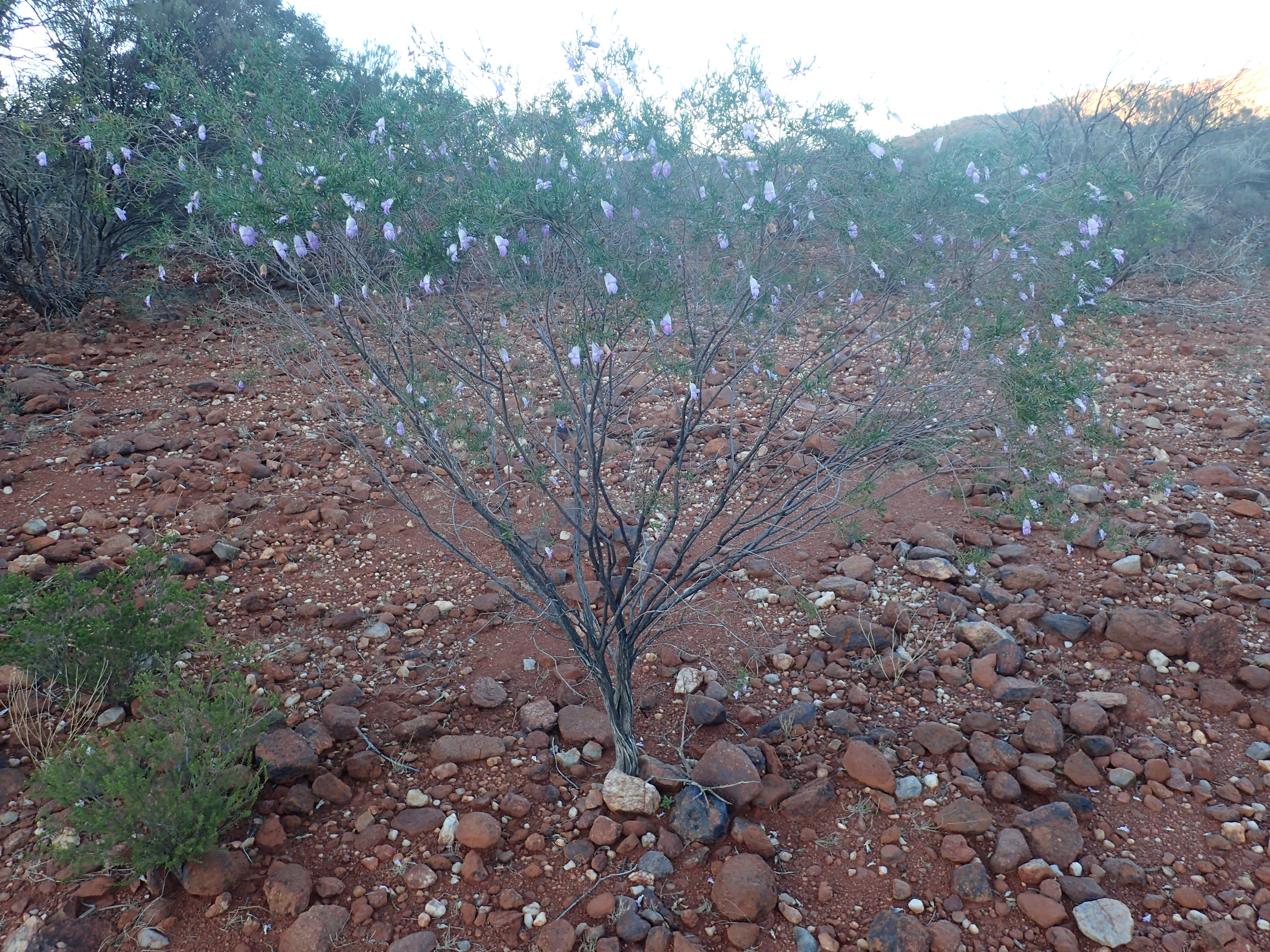
E. glutinosa growing near Mount Augustus

== Taxonomy and naming ==
The species was first formally described by Robert Chinnock in 1979 and the description was published in Journal of the Adelaide Botanic Garden. The specific epithet (glutinosa) is a Latin word meaning "sticky" or "viscous", referring to the sticky leaves of this species.

== Distribution and habitat ==
Eremophila glutinosa usually grows on rocky hills, on granite outcrops or along temporary watercourses in clay or sandy soils between Laverton and Mount Augustus in the Avon Wheatbelt, Gascoyne, Murchison and Yalgoo biogeographic regions.

== Conservation status ==
Sticky emu bush is classified as "not threatened" by the Western Australian Government Department of Parks and Wildlife.

== Use in horticulture ==
This eremophila is not well known in cultivation and has generally only been grown by propagating onto Myoporum rootstock. It grows in full sun or partial shade but needs protection from frosts.
