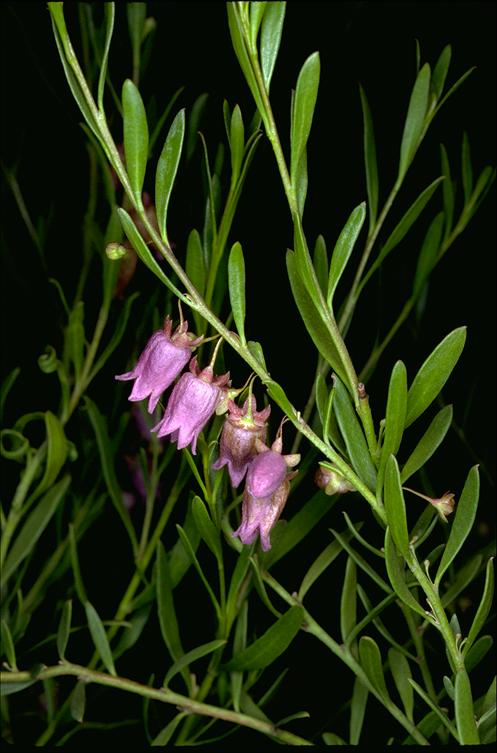
- C. inflatus in the Australian National Botanic Gardens

Conservation status
- Priority Four — Rare Taxa (DEC)

Scientific classification
- Kingdom: Plantae
- Clade: Tracheophytes
- Clade: Angiosperms
- Clade: Eudicots
- Clade: Asterids
- Order: Lamiales
- Family: Scrophulariaceae
- Tribe: Myoporeae
- Genus: Calamphoreus; Chinnock
- Species: C. inflatus

Binomial name
- Calamphoreus inflatus (C.Gardner) Chinnock

Synonyms
- Calamphoreus inflatus Paczk. & A.R.Chapm. nom. inval.; Eremophila inflata C.A.Gardner

= Calamphoreus =

Genus of flowering plants

Calamphoreus inflatus is a shrub native to Western Australia and the only species of the flowering plant genus Calamphoreus in the family Scrophulariaceae. It was formerly known as Eremophila inflata; unlike eremophilas, this species has twisted stamens and an urn-shaped petal tube which remains attached to the fruits after flowering.

== Description ==
Calamphoreus inflatus is a shrub sometimes growing to a height of 1.5 metres (5 ft) and spreading to 2 metres (7 ft) wide with branches that are slightly sticky when young. The leaves are arranged alternately, mostly 15–35 millimetres (0.6–1 in) long, 2–6 millimetres (0.08–0.2 in) wide, thick, sticky and elliptic or narrow lance-shaped.

The flowers are arranged singly or in groups of up to 5 in the axils of leaves on a stalk 4.5–7 millimetres (0.2–0.3 in) long. There are 5 oblong sepals which are hairy, and after flowering develop a network of distinct veins. There are also 5 petals joined at their bases, forming an expanded bell-shaped tube. The petal tube is purple except inside the tube where it is white, spotted with purple. The tube is 7.5–10.5 millimetres (0.3–0.4 in) long with lobes that are rounded and of unequal lengths. There are 4 short stamens with twisted or curved filaments. Flowering occurs mainly in summer and is followed by densely hairy, oval-shaped fruits about 3 millimetres (0.1 in) long with the dried petal tube remaining on the outside.

== Taxonomy and naming ==
Calamphoreus inflatus was first formally described in 1942 by Charles Gardner in Journal of the Royal Society of Western Australia as Eremophila inflata from a specimen collected in the Coolgardie district near Mount Holland and Lake Cronin. The genus name (Calamphoreus) is from the Ancient Greek words kalos meaning "beautiful" and amphoreus meaning "two-handled vase", "pitcher", "jar", "jug" or "cinerary urn" referring to the shape of the flowers. The specific epithet (inflatus) is a Latin word meaning "puffed up" or "swollen".

== Distribution and habitat ==
Calamphoreus inflatus occurs from Lake King to Mount Holland and in nearby areas in the Coolgardie and Mallee biogeographic regions. It has also been recorded east of Hyden. It grows in gravelly loam on flats and disturbed sites.

== Conservation ==
Calamphoreus inflatus is classified as "Priority Four" by the Government of Western Australia Department of Parks and Wildlife meaning that it is rare or near threatened.

== Use in horticulture ==
Commonly cultivated as Eremophila inflata, this species grows well in most soils provided it is well drained and in a sunny position. It is most easily propagated from cuttings.
