= Thiin language =

Nearly extinct Australian Aboriginal language

Thiin
- Thiinma
- Native to: Australia
- Region: Western Australia
- Ethnicity: Tenma people
- Native speakers: 1 (2026)
- Language family: Pama–Nyungan: Kanyara–Mantharta; Mantharta; Thiin

Language codes
- ISO 639-3: iin
- Glottolog: thii1234
- AIATSIS: W25
- ELP: Thiinma

Thiin (Thiinma) is a nearly extinct Australian Aboriginal language of the Mantharta group, spoken in Western Australia. As of 2026, only one person, Peter Salmon, can speak it.

== Name ==
Thiin is also known as Thiinma. This name is derived from a phonotactic constraint in which all words in the Mantharta languages must end in a vowel; roots that would otherwise end in a nasal consonant have the element -ma added to them. Other spellings include Denma, Te:n, Teen, and Tenma.

== Classification ==
Thiin is a Mantharta language, named after the word mantharta 'man, human being', which is found in all four languages. Geoffrey O'Grady, Charles F. Voegelin, and Florence M. Voegelin classified Thiin as a Mantharta language alongside Warriyangga and Jiwarli, while Tharrkari was put in the Kanyara languages instead. According to Peter Austin, Jiwarli is closer to Thiin. For instance, the first person dual pronoun nganthurra is shared by Thiin and Jiwarli, while it is nganhurra in Warriyangga instead.

== Geographical distribution ==
Thiin was traditionally spoken in a territory to the west of the Wajarri and Inawongga, and to the east of the Djiwali and Warriyangga. The territory of the Tenma people is not as well known as that of the other Mantharta-speaking peoples; according to Jack Butler, the last speaker of Jiwarli, put it in the Barlee Range, southwest of Jiwarli, as well as on Wanna Station, though it was not distributed as east as Mount Augustus, located in Wajarri territory. Alfred Radcliffe-Brown put Thiin "[o]n the Frederick River, a tributary of the Lyons". Connelly put it "inland, head of Henry River". Bates put it "about Wondarry Creek, which rises in Capricorn Range". Norman Tindale gave its distribution at the "head of Henry River; Barlee Range; on Marillana".

== Phonology ==
=== Consonants ===
Consonants in Thiin
	Peripheral		Laminal		Apical	
	Labial	Velar	Dental	Palatal	Alveolar	Retroflex
Plosive	p	k	t̪	c	t	ʈ
Nasal	m	ŋ	n̪	ɲ	n	ɳ
Rhotic					ɾ	
Lateral			l̪	ʎ	l	ɭ
Approximant	w			j		ɻ

- Stops may also be voiced as [b, ɡ, d̪, ɟ, d, ɖ] in medial position.

=== Vowels ===
	Front	Back
Close	i, iː	u, uː
Open	a, aː	
