= Burduna language =

Aboriginal language of Western Australia

Burduna
- Purduna
- Native to: Australia
- Region: Ashburton and Gascoyne rivers
- Ethnicity: Buruna
- Extinct: by 1994
- Language family: Pama–Nyungan: Kanyara–Mantharta; Kanyara; Burduna

Language codes
- ISO 639-3: bxn
- Glottolog: burd1238
- AIATSIS: W24
- ELP: Purduna

Burduna (Purduna) is an Aboriginal language that was traditionally spoken in the region between the Ashburton and Gascoyne Rivers in the Pilbara region of Western Australia. It belongs to the Kanyara group of languages, which also includes Binigura/Pinikura, Thalanyji, and Bayungu.

The language is currently classified as critically endangered, with no recorded native speakers by 1994. However, there are some people of Burduna heritage who can still speak and recognise a few words and phrases.

== History ==
=== Evolution ===
Burduna has been classified as a double-marking language. Although it has been categorised as a Kanyara language, it is significantly different from the other languages in the category as it underwent a number of changes in pronunciation.

Over the years, the language lost most of its nasal sounds and tones. Certain words that contains peripheral stops with p and k sounds lenited to a w sound instead. For example, papu 'father' became pawu, and puka 'bad' became puwa. However, this lenition did not occur when the previous syllable contained a w. Instead, the consonants p and k descended, and were pronounced as b and g respectively.

Another marked difference included the pronunciation of polysyllabic words such as yakan 'spouse' and pukurra 'devil'. These words lost their middle consonants and were shortened to yaan and puurra. The vowels were pronounced with a long, drawn-out sound.

Burduna words also contained consonant clusters in words such as gb in dagba 'spider' or rdg in ngardga 'beard'. Furthermore, words that originally contained consonant clusters underwent lenition and were pronounced with softer sounds. For example, mb was pronounced as p, nd as t, and ngg as k.

In addition, where other languages have a dh or a j in the middle of words, Burduna evolved to contain a y. For example, the Thalanyji word ngadhal 'cousin' has its Burduna complement spelt as ngayal.

=== Extinction ===
As a result of white settlement along the Ashburton and Gascyone river regions, the language ceased to be used, and is believed to have died out sometime during the first half of the twentieth century. There are a few people living in Onslow and Carnarvon who can still speak and recognize a few words and phrases, but the majority of Burduna descendants have intermarried with other language groups. The National Language Indigenous 2004 Survey estimated that there are no native speakers of the language. It has thus been classified as endangerment level 0.

== Culture and development ==
The Burduna people were located around the Nyang and Maroonah regions between the Ashburton and Gascyone rivers in north-western Australia. Their traditional country regions included the regions around the Yannarie and Lyndon rivers. Some of the area in and around the Towera region is also identified as being traditional Burduna land.

The Kanyara people traditionally spoke three different languages - Purduna or Burduna, Thalanyji, and Bayungu or Payungu. The three languages share highly similar sentence structure and vocabulary, with 60-70% of words being common across all three of them.

== Grammar ==
=== Word classes ===
There are two major word classes and three minor ones in the Burduna language. The first major word class contains the nominal words, which includes nouns and adjectives, names, pronouns, demonstratives, and cardinal directions.

The second major word group includes the verbs. The three minor word groups include adverbs, particles, and interjections.
