= Buruna =

Aboriginal Australian people

The Buruna, also known as the Punduna, are an Aboriginal Australian people of the Mid West region of Western Australia.

== Language ==
The Buruna spoke Burduna, which belongs to the Kanyara branch of the Pama-Nyungan language family

== Society ==
The societal structure of the Burduna people consisted of four different subsets. Each subset was further divided into 'totems', and each totem was further divided into 'phrartries'. Individuals within a phrartry were assigned gender-specific titles, and these titles were used to address them in the same manner as personal names are used today. A totemic phrartry was inherited in a patrilineal manner, i.e., an offspring born to parents from two different phrartries was assigned to the phrartry of the father. Marriages within the same totem phrartry were not allowed.

Often, these totems and phrartries interspersed with people from different linguistic backgrounds. For example, the totem 'Snake' included the Burduna-speaking population as well as the Thalanyji-speaking population.

Totems in the societal structure of the Burduna people in the Ashburton district
Totem	Male name	Female name	Tribe
Emu	Wariara	Ngogodji	Burduna
Turkey & Fire	Waliri	Wilari	Burduna
Snake	Wiarrji	Mambulu	Burduna, Thalanyji

== Country ==
According to Norman Tindale's calculation, the Buruna's tribal lands covered about 3,300 square miles (8,500 km^{2}). He places them at Yannarie River (Pindar Creek) and southwest as far as Winning Pool and the northern side of the Lyndon River. Their eastern confines lay around Mount Hamlet and Maroonah. They occasionally ventured into Tenma territory at the Henry River.

== History of contact ==
The remnants of the Buruna moved to and settled around Towera Station.

== Alternative names ==
- Budoona
- Peedona
- Poordoona
- Puduna
- Wati Puruna

Source: Tindale 1974, p. 240

== Sources ==
- "AIATSIS map of Indigenous Australia". AIATSIS. 14 May 2024.
- Austin, Peter (2015). A Grammar of the Mantharta Languages, Western Australia. School of Oriental and African Studies.
- "Tindale Tribal Boundaries" (PDF). Department of Aboriginal Affairs, Western Australia. September 2016. Archived from the original (PDF) on 8 March 2016.
- Tindale, Norman Barnett (1974). "Buruna (WA)". Aboriginal Tribes of Australia: Their Terrain, Environmental Controls, Distribution, Limits, and Proper Names. Australian National University Press. ISBN 978-0-708-10741-6.
