= List of heritage places in the Shire of Upper Gascoyne =

List of heritage sites in Western Australia

The State Register of Heritage Places is maintained by the Heritage Council of Western Australia. As of 2026, 20 places are heritage-listed in the Shire of Upper Gascoyne, of which one is on the State Register of Heritage Places, the Upper Gascoyne Road Board Office in Gascoyne Junction.

== List ==
=== State Register of Heritage Places ===
The Western Australian State Register of Heritage Places, as of 2026, lists the following state registered places within the Shire of Upper Gascoyne:

Place name	Place #	Location	Suburb or town	Co-ordinates	Built	State registered	Notes	Photo
Upper Gascoyne Road Board Office (former)	15408	Scott Street	Gascoyne Junction	25.054463°S 115.209033°E	1912	15 December 2000	A single storey timber and iron building in the Federation Bungalow style	

=== Shire of Upper Gascoyne heritage-listed places ===
The following places are heritage listed in the Shire of Upper Gascoyne but are not State registered:

Place name	Place #	Street #	Street name	Suburb or town	Notes & former names	Photo
Bangemall Wayside Hotel (former), Cobra Station	4129		Cobra-Mt Augustus Road	Bangemall via Gascoyne Junction	Cobra Station Homestead (former), Euranna Hotel	
Dairy Creek Station	11739	Banks	Geeranoo Creek, Carnarvon-Mullewa Road	Carnarvon		
Junction Hotel	15409	Lot 27	Carnarvon-Mullewa Road	Gascoyne	Destroyed by floods in 2010	
Old Cemetery	15410			Gascoyne		
Carey Downs Station	15412		Carey Downs Road	Gascoyne		
Winderie Station	15413		Winderie-Callagiday Road	Gascoyne		
Jimba Jimba Station	15414		Carnarvon-Mullewa Road	Gascoyne		
Bidgemia Station	15415		Carnarvon-Mullewa Road	Gascoyne		
Lyons River Station	15416		Ullawarra Road	Gascoyne		
Mount Sandiman Station	15417		Ullawarra Road	Gascoyne		
Minnie Creek Station	15418		Ullawarra Road	Gascoyne		
Cobra Station Homestead - Original	15419		Cobra-Mt Augustus Road	Bangemall via Gascoyne Junction		
Mount Augustus Station	15420		Cobra-Mt Augustus Road	Gascoyne		
Landor Station	15421		Landor-Mt Augustus Road	Gascoyne	Nundigo Well and Stockyard	
Star of Mangaroon Mine	16670			Gascoyne		
Mangaroon Lead Mine	16671			Gascoyne Goldfield		
Gascoyne Junction Police Station	17311		Scott Street	Gascoyne Junction		
Fossil Hill	18642			Bidgemia Station		
Waldburg Homestead	27319		Waldburg Road	East Lyons River		
