= Acacia demissa =

Scientific classification
- Kingdom: Plantae
- Clade: Tracheophytes
- Clade: Angiosperms
- Clade: Eudicots
- Clade: Rosids
- Order: Fabales
- Family: Fabaceae
- Subfamily: Caesalpinioideae
- Clade: Mimosoid clade
- Genus: Acacia
- Species: A. demissa

Binomial name
- Acacia demissa R.S.Cowan & Maslin
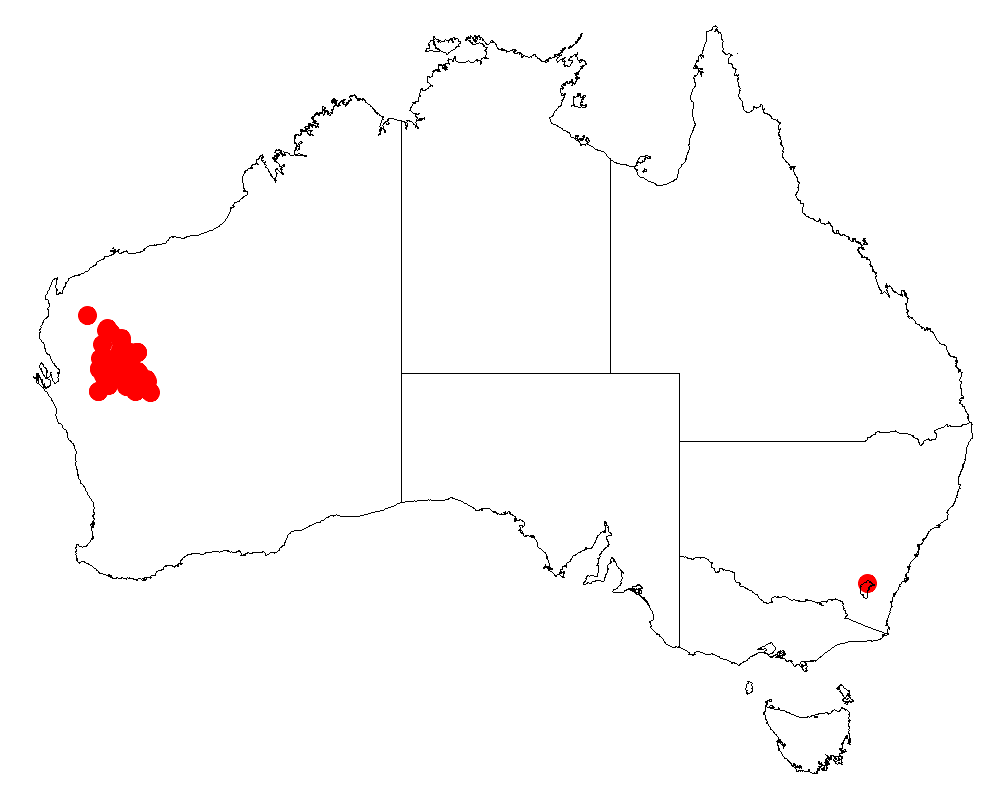
- Occurrence data from AVH

Synonyms
- Racosperma demissum (R.S.Cowan & Maslin) Pedley

Species of legume

Acacia demissa is a species of flowering plant in the family Fabaceae and is endemic to inland Western Australia. It is a shrub or tree with pendulous, slender, glabrous branchlets, pendulous linear to narrowly elliptic phyllodes, oblong to cylindrical heads of golden yellow flowers and oblong to narrowly oblong, thick and woody pods.

== Description ==
Acacia demissa is shrub or tree with that typically grows to a height of up to 4 m (13 ft) and has slender, glabrous, pendulous branchlets and phyllodes. The phyllodes are glabrous, linear to narrowly elliptic, mostly 65–150 mm (2.6–5.9 in) long, 1.5–4 mm (0.059–0.157 in) wide and thinly leathery with a hooked tip and many closely parallel veins. The flowers are golden yellow and borne in two or three oblong to cylindrical heads 8–23 mm (0.31–0.91 in) long in axils on a peduncle 2.5–5 mm (0.098–0.197 in) long. Flowering mainly occurs from April to June and the pods are oblong to narrowly oblong, up to 100 mm (3.9 in) long, 8–17 mm (0.31–0.67 in) wide, thick and woody, the margins 2 mm (0.079 in) wide. The seeds are broadly elliptic to nearly circular, 6.5–9 mm (0.26–0.35 in) long and dull brown to black with a small aril on the end.

== Taxonomy ==
Acacia demissa was first formally described in 1995 by Richard Cowan and Bruce Maslin in the journal Nuytsia from specimens collected by Maslin on Cobra Station, 82.5 km (51.3 mi) north of Landor Homestead on the track to Mount Augustus Station. The specific epithet (demissa) means 'drooping' or 'trailling'.

== Distribution and habitat ==
This species of wattle grows in a variety of habitats on low quartzite or granite hills, floodplains, flats and creeklines inland from Shark Bay between Gifford Station, about 270 km (170 mi) south-east of Carnarvon in the Gascoyne and Murchison bioregions of northern inland Western Australia.

== Conservation status ==
Acacia demissa is listed as "not threatened" by the Government of Western Australia Department of Biodiversity, Conservation and Attractions.
