= Tharrkari =

Indigenous people of the Gascyone region of Western Australia

The Tharrkari, also referred to as the Targari, are an Aboriginal Australian people of the Gascoyne region of Western Australia.

== Language ==
The Tharrkari spoke one of four dialects of Mantharta, the other members of the dialect continuum being the Thiin, Warriyangka and Djiwarli.

== Country ==
The Tharrkari's traditional lands were calculated by Norman Tindale to have covered from 3,200 square miles (8,300 km^{2}), including the coastal plain south of the Lyndon River and Lyndon Station, to west of Round Hill, and running east as far as Hill Springs and the headwaters of the Minilya River. Their southern boundary was around Middalya, Moogooree, and the Kennedy Range. Their eastern border was with the Wariangga and the Malgaru.

== History of contact ==
With the advent of white colonization and pressures from coastal development, the Tharrkari are said to have migrated eastwards to the Lyons River.

== Alternative names ==
- Dalgari, Tarlgarri
- Dargari
- Tarkari, Tarkarri
- Tarugar

Source: Tindale 1974, p. 257

== Sources ==
- "AIATSIS map of Indigenous Australia". AIATSIS. 14 May 2024.
- Austin, Peter (1988). "Aboriginal languages of the Gascoyne-Ashburton region". La Trobe Working Papers in Linguistics 1:43–63. La Trobe Working Papers in Linguistics. pp. 43–63.
- Austin, Peter (2015). A Grammar of the Mantharta Languages, Western Australia. School of Oriental and African Studies.
- Klokeid, Terry J. (1969). Thargari phonology and morphology. Australian National University.
- "Tindale Tribal Boundaries" (PDF). Department of Aboriginal Affairs, Western Australia. September 2016. Archived from the original (PDF) on 8 March 2016.
- Tindale, Norman Barnett (1974). "Targari (WA)". Aboriginal Tribes of Australia: Their Terrain, Environmental Controls, Distribution, Limits, and Proper Names. Australian National University. ISBN 978-0-708-10741-6. Archived from the original on 20 March 2020.
