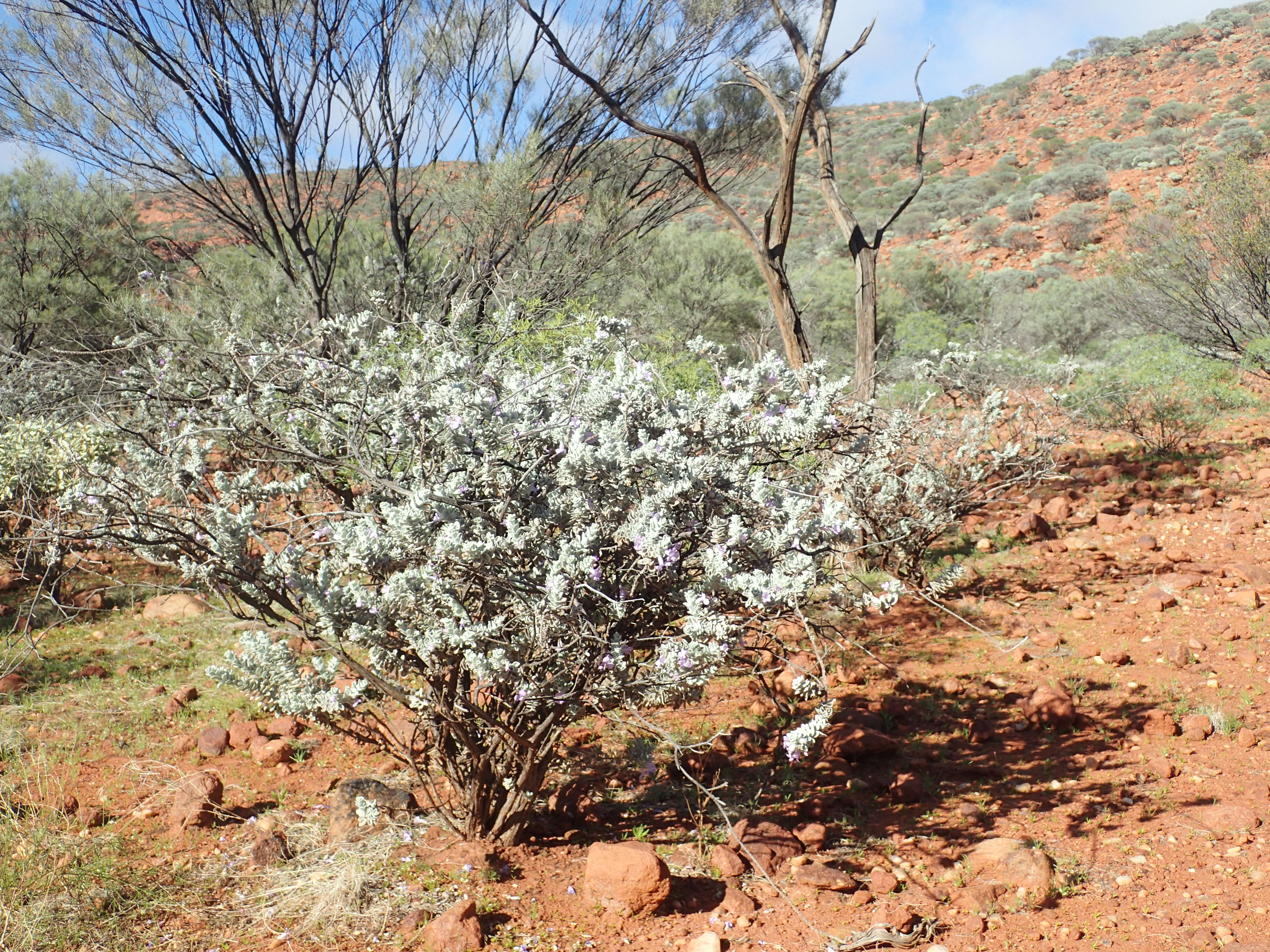
- E. conferta growing near Mount Augustus

Scientific classification
- Kingdom: Plantae
- Clade: Embryophytes
- Clade: Tracheophytes
- Clade: Spermatophytes
- Clade: Angiosperms
- Clade: Eudicots
- Clade: Asterids
- Order: Lamiales
- Family: Scrophulariaceae
- Genus: Eremophila
- Species: E. conferta

Binomial name
- Eremophila conferta Chinnock

= Eremophila conferta =

Species of flowering plant

Eremophila conferta is a flowering plant in the figwort family, Scrophulariaceae and is endemic to a small area in the central west of Western Australia. It is a shrub with many tangled branches with leaves crowded near their ends and with mauve or purple flowers.

== Description ==
Eremophila conferta is a shrub which usually grows to 1–1.5 m (3–5 ft) high with many tangled, dark brown branches which are often hidden, especially near their ends, by the leaves. The branches are covered with a layer of long, branched hairs. The leaves are arranged alternately, densely crowded and are covered with soft grey hairs. They are also elliptic to egg-shaped, mostly 12–25 mm (0.5–1 in) long, 6.5–13 mm (0.3–0.5 in) wide and have a distinct mid-vein on their lower surface.

The flowers are borne singly in leaf axils on stalks 3–9 mm (0.1–0.4 in) long. There are 5 narrow, lance-shaped sepals, 7–13.5 mm (0.3–0.5 in) long which have a felt-like texture due to a covering of long, soft hairs. The petals are 18–28 mm (0.7–1 in) long and joined at their lower end to form a tube. The petal tube is purple, blue or lilac-coloured and white inside, with faint purple spots and is mostly glabrous. The 4 stamens are fully enclosed in the petal tube. Flowering occurs mostly from August to September and is followed by fruits which are oval-shaped, yellow-brown with a papery covering and are about 5.5–7.5 mm (0.2–0.3 in) long.

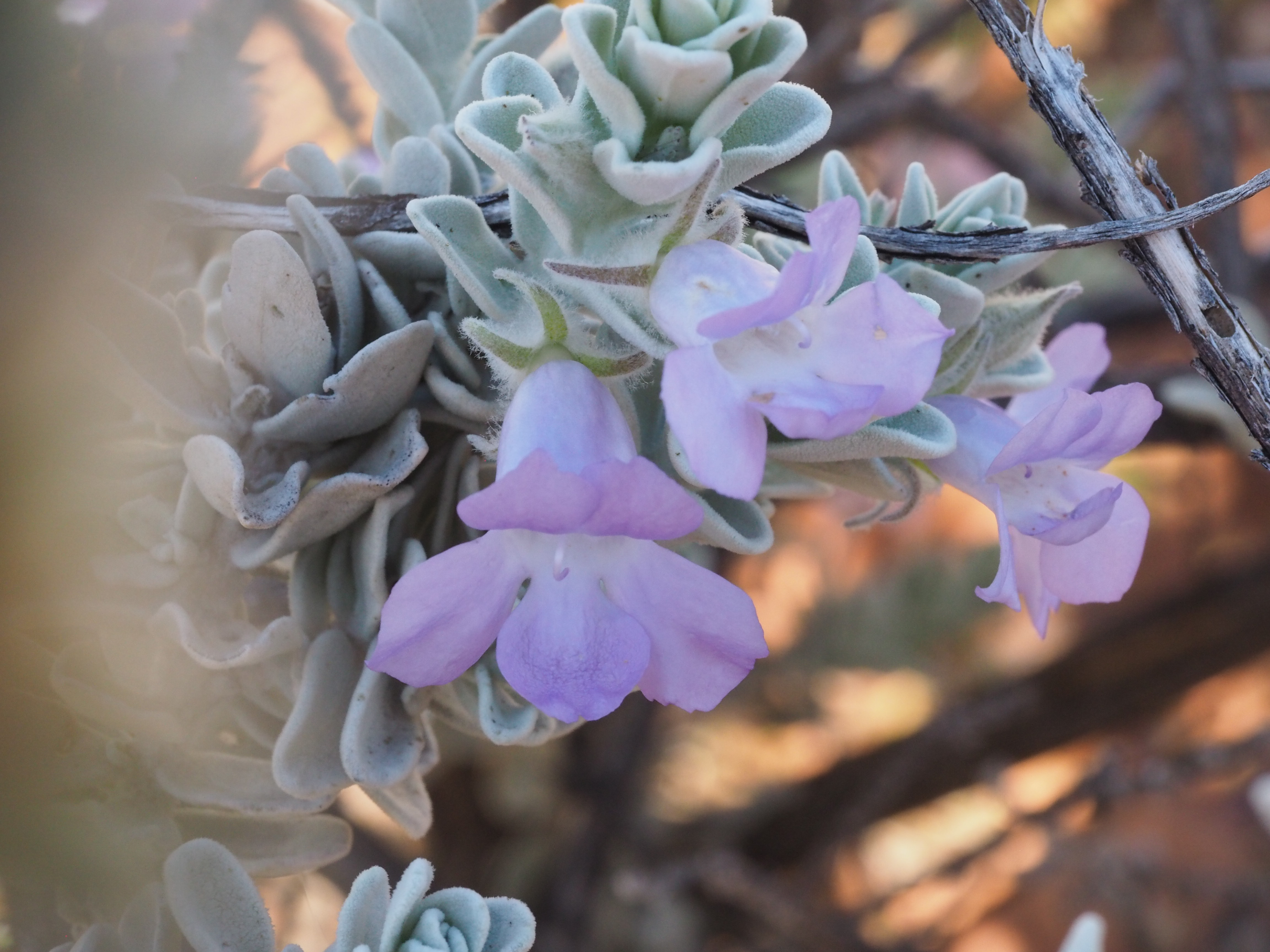
E. conferta leaves and flowers

== Taxonomy and naming ==
Eremophila conferta was first formally described by Robert Chinnock in 2007 and the description was published in Eremophila and Allied Genera: A Monograph of the Plant Family Myoporaceae. The type specimen was collected by Chinnock about 4 km (2 mi) west of the Mount Augustus homestead on the lower slopes of Mount Augustus. The specific epithet (conferta) is a Latin word meaning "crowded" referring to the leaves of this species.

== Distribution and habitat ==
This eremophila occurs between Kumarina and the Barlee Range in the Gascoyne biogeographic region where it grows in stony soils on plains, and stony ridges.

== Conservation status ==
Eremophila conferta is classified as "not threatened" by the Government of Western Australia Department of Parks and Wildlife.

== Use in horticulture ==
This eremophila features soft grey foliage and showy flowers but is frost sensitive and will not tolerate humidity. It has been propagated by grafting onto Myoporum and grown in well-drained soil in a sunny position.
