= Tenma people =

Indigenous Australian people of Western Australia

The Tenma or Thiin were an Aboriginal Australian people of the Pilbara region of Western Australia. They speak the Thiinma language.

== Language ==
The Thiin spoke one of four dialects of Mantharta, the other members of the dialect continuum being the Warriyangka, Djiwarli and Tharrkari.

== Country ==
The Tenma were a small tribe located around the head of the Henry River, the Barlee Range and the Frederick River. Norman Tindale assigned them an estimated 2,300 square miles (6,000 km^{2}) of traditional tribal land.

== Alternative names ==
- Te:n
- Teen

Source: Tindale 1974, p. 257

== Sources ==
- "AIATSIS map of Indigenous Australia". AIATSIS. 14 May 2024.
- Austin, Peter (2015). A Grammar of the Mantharta Languages, Western Australia. School of Oriental and African Studies.
- "Tindale Tribal Boundaries" (PDF). Department of Aboriginal Affairs, Western Australia. September 2016. Archived from the original (PDF) on 8 March 2016.
- Tindale, Norman Barnett (1974). "Tenma (WA)". Aboriginal Tribes of Australia: Their Terrain, Environmental Controls, Distribution, Limits, and Proper Names. Australian National University Press. ISBN 978-0-708-10741-6. Archived from the original on 20 March 2020.
