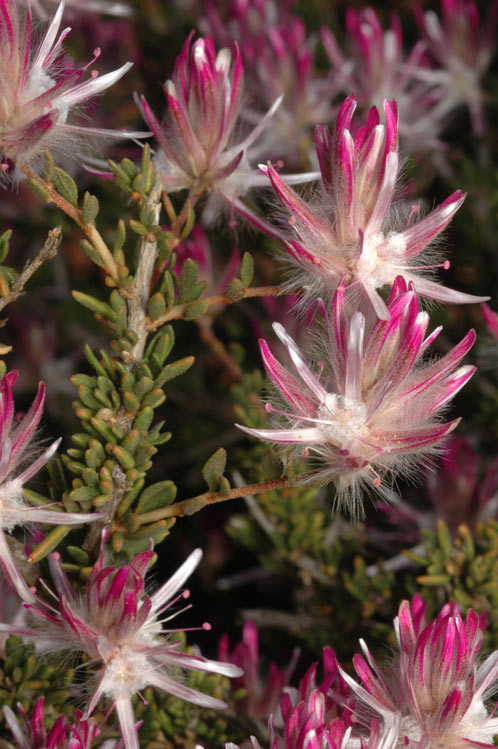

Scientific classification
- Kingdom: Plantae
- Clade: Tracheophytes
- Clade: Angiosperms
- Clade: Eudicots
- Order: Caryophyllales
- Family: Amaranthaceae
- Genus: Ptilotus
- Species: P. polakii

Binomial name
- Ptilotus polakii F.Muell.

Synonyms
- Ptilotus depressus W.Fitzg.; Trichinium depressum (W.Fitzg.) Farmar; Trichinium polackii Diels orth. var.; Trichinium polakii (F.Muell.) Diels

= Ptilotus polakii =

Species of plant

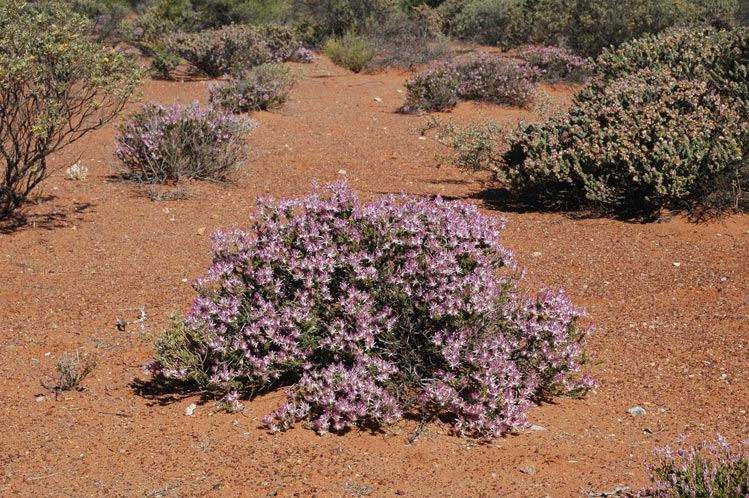
Habit near the Carnarvon-Mullewa road

Ptilotus polaki is a species of flowering in the family Amaranthaceae and is endemic the north-west of Western Australia. It is an erect shrub, with narrowly elliptic or egg-shaped leaves with the narrower end towards the base, or sometimes more or less spoon-shaped leaves, and spikes of pink, purple or whitish flowers.

== Description ==
Ptilotus polakii is an erect shrub that typically grows to 0.2–1 m (7.9 in – 3 ft 3.4 in) high and 0.3–1.2 mm (0.012–0.047 in) wide and has hairy, striated stems. The leaves are narrowly elliptic to egg-shaped with the narrower end towards the base or spoon-shaped, mostly 6–17 mm (0.24–0.67 in) long and 1.5–7 mm (0.059–0.276 in) wide on a petiole 0.5–1 mm (0.020–0.039 in) long. The leaves are sometimes clustered, glabrous or with a few hairs, greyish green to dull green. The flowers are borne in spherical, hemispherical or oblong spikes up to 35 mm (1.4 in) long with six to thirty flowers on a rachis up to 25 mm (0.98 in) long. There are translucent, pale golden brown, sometimes hairy bracts 2.5–6 mm (0.098–0.236 in) long and bracteoles 3.8–6 mm (0.15–0.24 in) long at the base of the flowers. The perianth is 8–16 mm (0.31–0.63 in) long and pink, purple or whitish, the two outer tepals 1–2 mm (0.039–0.079 in) longer than the inner tepals. The two stamens are 4.0–7.5 mm (0.16–0.30 in) long and there are three hairy staminodes 0.5–1.8 mm (0.020–0.071 in) long. The ovary is glabrous and the style is eccentric and straight or sinuous, 4–9 mm (0.16–0.35 in) long. Flowering occurs from July to November.

== Taxonomy ==
Ptilotus polakii was first formally described in 1882 by Ferdinand von Mueller in the Southern Science Record from specimens collected by Joseph Polack near the Gascoyne River. The specific epithet (polakii) honours the collector of the type specimens, who accompanied John Forrest on his expedition the Gascoyne River, and collected many specimens which Forrest sent to von Mueller.

In 2009, Terena Lally described two suspecies of P. polakii in the journal Nuytsia, and the names are accepted by the Australian Plant Census:

- Ptilotus polakii subsp. juxta Lally has the top part of the outer tepals glabrous for 3–4 mm (0.12–0.16 in) long and 1.0–1.6 mm (0.039–0.063 in) wide, the bract equal in length to the bracteole.
- Ptilotus polakii F.Muell. subsp. polakii has the top part of the outer tepals glabrous for 1–2 mm (0.039–0.079 in) long and less than 1 mm (0.039 in) wide, the bract shorter than the bracteole.

== Distribution and habitat ==
This species of Ptilotus grows in sandy and clayey, sometimes stony soils in the Carnarvon, Gascoyne, Geraldton Sandplains, Murchison and Yalgoo bioregions of north-western Western Australia. Subspecies juxta occurs from near Onslow to Shark Bay and from Carnarvon to just beyond the North West Coastal Highway in the Carnarvon and Gascoyne bioregions. Subspecies polakii grows in well-drained sandy or clayey loam, often in stony sites, mainly from the Kennedy Range National Park near Gascoyne Junction to Coolcalalaya and Yallong stations (about 100 km (62 mi) east of Kalbarri), inland to Wongawal station (about 180 km (110 mi) east of Wiluna), and the Mount Magnet area, in the Carnarvon, Gascoyne, Geraldton Sandplains, Murchison and Yalgoo bioregions of north-western Western Australia.

== Conservation status ==
Both subspecies of Ptilotus polakii are listed as "not threatened" by the Government of Western Australia Department of Biodiversity, Conservation and Attractions.
