= Swainsona pedunculata =

Scientific classification
- Kingdom: Plantae
- Clade: Tracheophytes
- Clade: Angiosperms
- Clade: Eudicots
- Clade: Rosids
- Order: Fabales
- Family: Fabaceae
- Subfamily: Faboideae
- Genus: Swainsona
- Species: S. pedunculata

Binomial name
- Swainsona pedunculata A.T.Lee

Species of legume

Swainsona pedunculata is a species of flowering plant in the family Fabaceae and is endemic to inland areas of Western Australia. It is a small, ascending annual herb with imparipinnate leaves with 3 to 7 narrowly elliptic or lance-shaped leaflets, and racemes of 2 to 3 purple flowers.

== Description ==
Swainsona pedunculata is an annual herb up to 20 cm (7.9 in) high with strongly ribbed and hairy stems. Its leaves are imparipinnate, less than 50 mm (2.0 in) long on a long petiole, with 3 to 7, usually 5 narrowly elliptic or lance-shaped leaflets, the lower leaflets 10–20 mm (0.39–0.79 in) long and 1–2 mm (0.039–0.079 in) wide. There is a tapering linear stipule often 5 mm (0.20 in) long at the base of the petiole. The flowers are arranged in racemes with 2 to 3 flowers on a peduncle about 0.5 mm (0.020 in) long, each flower 10–15 mm (0.39–0.59 in) long on a pedicel 1–2 mm (0.039–0.079 in) long. The sepals are joined at the base, forming a tube about 2 mm (0.079 in) long, the sepal lobes about twice as long as the tube. The petals are purple, the standard petal about 15 mm (0.59 in) long and wide, the wings 10–15 mm (0.39–0.59 in) long, and the keel about 10 mm (0.39 in) long and 5 mm (0.20 in) long and 1.0–1.5 mm (0.039–0.059 in) deep. The fruit is about 25 mm (0.98 in) long and 3 mm (0.12 in) wide.

== Taxonomy and naming ==
Swainsona pedunculata was first formally described in 1948 by Alma Theodora Lee in Contributions from the New South Wales National Herbarium, from specimens collected by Charles Gardner in the Kennedy Range in 1941. The specific epithet (pedunculata) means "pedunculate".

== Distribution and habitat ==
This species of pea grows in rocky or stony places in the Carnarvon, Gascoyne and Murchison bioregions of inland Western Australia.
