= Calothamnus borealis =

Scientific classification
- Kingdom: Plantae
- Clade: Tracheophytes
- Clade: Angiosperms
- Clade: Eudicots
- Clade: Rosids
- Order: Myrtales
- Family: Myrtaceae
- Genus: Calothamnus
- Species: C. borealis

Binomial name
- Calothamnus borealis Hawkeswood

Synonyms
- Melaleuca aquilonia Craven & R.D.Edwards

Species of flowering plant

Calothamnus borealis is a plant in the myrtle family, Myrtaceae and is endemic to the south-west of Western Australia. It is a small, erect shrub with crowded, cylindrical leaves and red flowers. It grows in sand surrounded by spinifex or heath. In 2014 Craven, Edwards and Cowley proposed that the species be renamed Melaleuca aquilonia.

== Description ==
Calothamnus borealis is a low, spreading shrub with many stems, growing to a height of about 1.0 metre (3 ft) and with new growth covered with soft hairs. Its leaves are crowded, mostly 7–10 millimetres (0.3–0.4 in) long and 1.0–1.5 millimetres (0.04–0.06 in) wide, cylindrical in shape, tapering to a non-prickly point. They are covered with short hairs giving a greyish tinge.

The flowers are red and are arranged in small clusters containing 1 to 12 individual flowers, mostly hidden among the leaves. The petals are about 5 millimetres (0.2 in) long, pinkish to brownish in colour with a papery texture. The stamens are arranged in 5 claw-like bundles with 20 to 25 stamens per bundle. Flowering occurs from July to September and is followed by fruits which are woody, almost cylindrical capsules, 6.5–10 millimetres (0.3–0.4 in) long and 7–10 millimetres (0.3–0.4 in) in diameter.

== Taxonomy and naming ==
Calothamnus borealis was first formally described in 1984 by Trevor Hawkeswood from a specimen found near Exmouth. The specific epithet (borealis) is derived from the Latin, meaning "north" or "northern" and refers to the fact that this species has the most northerly distribution of any of the Calothamnus species.

== Distribution and habitat ==
Calothamnus borealis occurs from the Exmouth area south to Coral Bay, with a disjunct population in the Kennedy Range. Its range is within the Carnarvon biogeographic region. It grows in sand dunes in heath or spinifex grassland.

== Conservation ==
This species is classified as "not threatened" by the Western Australian government department of parks and wildlife.
