= Warriyangga =

Indigenous Western Australian people

The Wariangga, also written Warriyangka, are an Aboriginal Australian people of the Gascoyne region in Western Australia.

== Language ==
The Warriyangka spoke one of four dialects of Mantharta, the other members of the dialect continuum being the Thiin, Djiwarli and Tharrkari.

== Country ==
According to Norman Tindale's estimation the Wariangga's tribal lands stretched over approximately 1,700 square miles (4,400 km^{2}) in the Gascoyne region, covering areas of the upper Lyons River, and including also Gifford and Minnie Creeks, Edmund and the area east of Maroonah. Tindale states also that they held to a strict maintenance of boundaries. Their neighbours were the Tenma to the north, the Dyiwali to their northeast, the Ninanu directly east, the Watjarri southeast, the Malgaru at their southern limits, and the Tharrkari due west.

== Social organization ==
The Wariangga did not practice circumcision. Their marriage system was described by Daisy Bates.

== Alternative names ==
- Wariengga, Warianga, Warienga, Warrijangga
- Wariwongga, Wari-wonga, Warriwonga
- Woorienga, Woorenga

Source Tindale 1974, p. 259:

== Sources ==
- "AIATSIS map of Indigenous Australia". AIATSIS. 14 May 2024.
- Austin, Peter (2015). A Grammar of the Mantharta Languages, Western Australia. School of Oriental and African Studies.
- Bates, Daisy (1914). "Social Organization of some Western Australian Tribes". Report of the Fourteenth Meeting of the Australasian Association for the Advancement of Science (Report). Vol. 14. pp. 387–400 – via BHL.
- "Tindale Tribal Boundaries" (PDF). Department of Aboriginal Affairs, Western Australia. September 2016. Archived from the original (PDF) on 8 March 2016.
- Tindale, Norman Barnett (1974). "Wariangga (WA)". Aboriginal Tribes of Australia: Their Terrain, Environmental Controls, Distribution, Limits, and Proper Names. Australian National University Press. ISBN 978-0-708-10741-6. Archived from the original on 20 March 2020.
