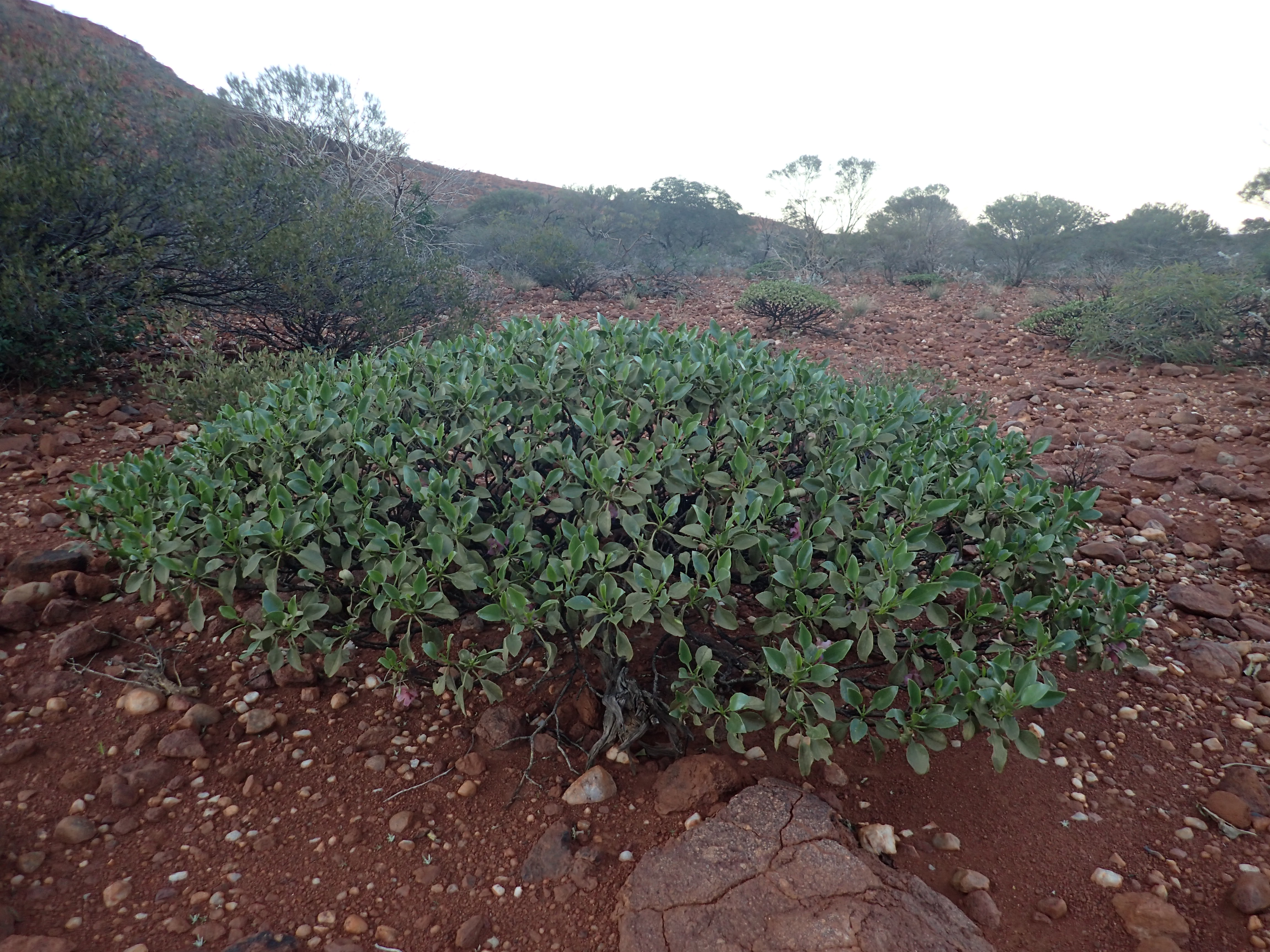
- Eremophila flaccida flaccida growing near Mount Augustus

Scientific classification
- Kingdom: Plantae
- Clade: Embryophytes
- Clade: Tracheophytes
- Clade: Spermatophytes
- Clade: Angiosperms
- Clade: Eudicots
- Clade: Asterids
- Order: Lamiales
- Family: Scrophulariaceae
- Genus: Eremophila
- Species: E. flaccida

Binomial name
- Eremophila flaccida Chinnock

= Eremophila flaccida =

Species of flowering plant

Eremophila flaccida is a flowering plant in the figwort family, Scrophulariaceae and is endemic to Western Australia. It is a low, spreading shrub with sticky, shiny foliage and large, attractive flowers. There are two subspecies, one common and relatively widespread, the other known from only a few locations.

== Description ==
Eremophila flaccida is a shrub, usually growing to less than 1.0 m (3 ft) tall, but often spreading to 3 or 4 m (9.8 or 13 ft) wide with branches and leaves which are sticky and shiny due to the presence of large amounts of resin. The leaves are arranged alternately along the stems, egg-shaped, 30–95 mm (1–4 in) long, 4–30 mm (0.2–1 in) wide, glabrous, sticky and shiny. They usually have a distinct stalk 12–24 mm (0.5–0.9 in) long, a raised mid-rib on the lower surface and sometimes have a few teeth on their edges.

The flowers are borne singly in leaf axils from which they hang on a glabrous stalk 30–45 mm (1–2 in) long. There are 5 overlapping, reddish-purple, egg-shaped sepals which differ in size from each other, the longest ones 24–31 mm (0.94–1.2 in) while the shortest is 15–25 mm (0.59–0.98 in) long. The outer surface of the sepals is hairy and the inner surface glabrous. The petals are 40–50 mm (1.6–2.0 in) long and joined at their lower end to form a tube. The tube is brown but the petal lobes on its end purplish-blue and up to 20 mm (0.8 in) long, with two of the lobes spreading like rabbits' ears. The outer surface of the tube and both sides of the lobes are covered with short hairs and the inside of the tube is full of long, soft hairs. The 4 stamens extend beyond the end of the petal tube. Flowering occurs from June to September and is followed by fruits which are dry, oval shaped with a pointed end and 6–9 mm (0.24–0.35 in) long.

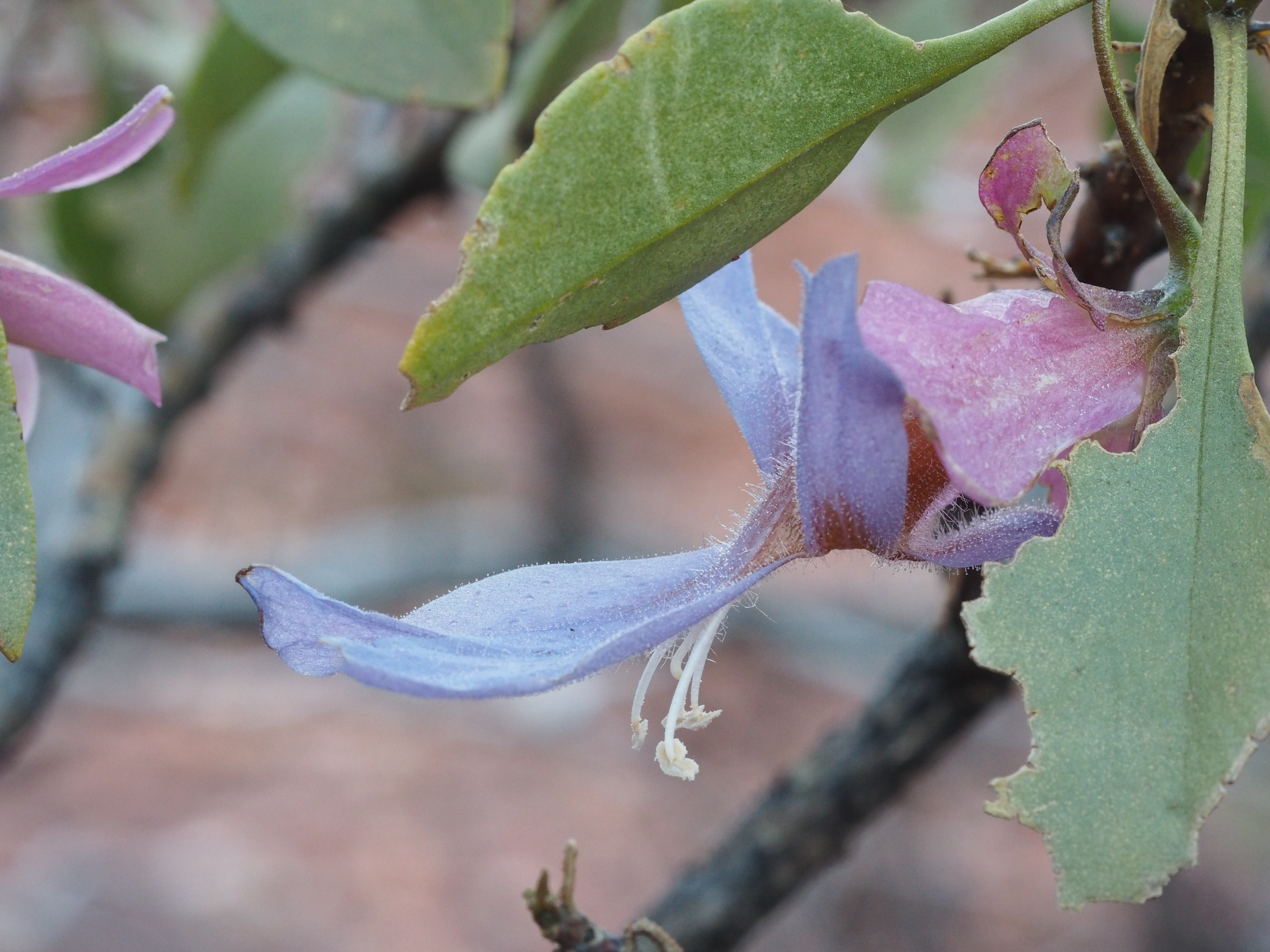
E. flaccida flaccida leaves and flowers

== Taxonomy and naming ==
The species was first formally described by Robert Chinnock in 2007 and the description was published in Eremophila and Allied Genera: A Monograph of the Plant Family Myoporaceae. The specific epithet (flaccida) is a Latin word meaning "drooping" referring to the hanging flowers of this species.

In the same publication, Chinnock described two subspecies and the names have been accepted by the Australian Plant Census:

- Eremophila flaccida Chinnock subsp. flaccida which has egg-shaped leaves with a distinct stalk;
- Eremophila flaccida subsp. attenuata Chinnock which has linear to lance-shaped leaves which taper gradually towards the base and lack a distinct stalk.

== Distribution and habitat ==
Eremophila flaccida subsp. flaccida grows in stony clay and is common in areas near the Hamersley Range, including Mount Augustus in the Gascoyne and Pilbara biogeographic regions. Subspecies attenuata is much less common, occurring in a few locations between Byro Station and Dairy Creek Station in the Murchison biogeographic region.

== Conservation status ==
Eremophila flaccida subsp. flaccida is classified as "not threatened" by the Western Australian Government Department of Parks and Wildlife, however subspecies attenuata is classified as "Priority Three" meaning that it is poorly known and known from only a few locations but is not under imminent threat.

== Use in horticulture ==
The rounded shape of this eremophila and its large orchid-like flowers make it a desirable plant for the garden. It is very difficult to propagate from either seed or cuttings but can be grafted onto Myoporum rootstock. Its method of propagation allows it to grow in any soil and it will grow in full sun or partial shade, is very drought tolerant but is affected by frost. Frost may blacken the plant but it usually recovers its leaves and rounded shape.
