= Ninanu =

Indigneous people of Western Australia

The Ninanu were an Aboriginal Australian people of the Gascoyne region of Western Australia.

== Country ==
According to Norman Tindale, the Ninanu's tribal lands covered roughly 4,500 square miles (12,000 km^{2}) on both the Lyons and North Lyons Rivers, extending west as far as the vicinity of Mount Phillips and Peedawarra Bluff. Their eastern boundary lay at the eastern end of Teano Range, while their southern frontier was in proximity of Mount Augustus.

== Social customs ==
The Ninanu's initiatory rites involved the practice of both circumcision and subincision.

== Alternative name ==
One possible alternative name for the Ninanu may be Ngaunmardi. The word is attested only in manuscripts collecting ethnographic data written by Carl Georg von Brandenstein, which state that this referred to a people on Dooley Downs on the Lyons River. Unable to find independent corroboration for this tribe, Tindale speculated that it might have been an alternative name for the Ninanu in the same area.

== Sources ==
- "AIATSIS map of Indigenous Australia". AIATSIS. 14 May 2024.
- "Tindale Tribal Boundaries" (PDF). Department of Aboriginal Affairs, Western Australia. September 2016. Archived from the original (PDF) on 8 March 2016.
- Tindale, Norman Barnett (1974). "Ninanu (WA)". Aboriginal Tribes of Australia: Their Terrain, Environmental Controls, Distribution, Limits, and Proper Names. Australian National University. ISBN 978-0-708-10741-6. Archived from the original on 20 March 2020.
