= Jiwarli dialect =

Extinct Australian Aboriginal language

Jiwarli
- Region: Western Australia
- Ethnicity: Jiwarli
- Extinct: 10 May 1986, with the death of Jack Butler
- Language family: Pama–Nyungan: Kanyara–Mantharta; Mantharta; Jiwarli

Language codes
- ISO 639-3: dze
- Glottolog: djiw1241
- AIATSIS: W28
- ELP: Jiwarli

Jiwarli (also spelt Djiwarli, Tjiwarli) is an extinct Australian Aboriginal language formerly spoken in the Pilbara region of Western Australia. It is a variety of the Mantharta language of the large Pama–Nyungan family. The last native speaker of Jiwarli, Jack Butler, died in May 1986.

== Documentation ==
Prof Peter K. Austin (Linguistics Department, SOAS) collected all the available material on Jiwarli during fieldwork with Jack Butler from 1978 to 1985. He has published a volume of texts on the language and a bilingual dictionary (Jiwarli-English with English-Jiwarli finderlist).

== Phonology ==
=== Vowels ===
	Front	Back
High	i, iː	u, uː
Low	a, aː	

=== Consonants ===
	Peripheral		Laminal		Apical	
	Bilabial	Velar	Palatal	Dental	Alveolar	Postalveolar
Stop	p	k	c	t̪	t	ʈ
Nasal	m	ŋ	ɲ	n̪	n	ɳ
Lateral			ʎ	l̪	l	ɭ
Rhotic					r	ɻ
Semivowel	w		j			

=== Phonotactics ===
Word-initially, only non-apical stops, nasals and glides are allowed. Thus, words must begin with p, k, j, th, m, ng, nh, w, or y. Words may not begin with vowels.

All words end in vowels. Roots may end on a consonant, however, and -pa is added to all roots ending in l, rl, rr, and -ma is added to all roots ending in a nasal that would violate the vowel-final word constraint.
