= Bayungu language =

Australian Aboriginal language

Bayungu
- Payungu
- Native to: Australia
- Region: Western Australia
- Ethnicity: Baiyungu
- Native speakers: 2 (2005)
- Language family: Pama–Nyungan: Kanyara–Mantharta; Kanyara; Bayungu

Language codes
- ISO 639-3: bxj
- Glottolog: bayu1240
- AIATSIS: W23
- ELP: Payungu

Bayungu (Payungu) is an Australian Aboriginal language spoken along the Minilya River in the state of Western Australia by the Baiyungu people. There were 2 speakers in 2005.
