= Thalanyji language =

Australian Aboriginal language of the Pilbara region in Western Australia

Thalanyji
- Dhalandji
- Native to: Australia
- Ethnicity: Thalanyji, Yinikutira
- Native speakers: 6 (2005)
- Language family: Pama–Nyungan: Kanyara–Mantharta; Kanyara; Thalanyji

Language codes
- ISO 639-3: dhl
- Glottolog: dhal1245
- AIATSIS: W26
- ELP: Thalanyji

Thalanyji (also spelt Dhalandji, Thalanyji, and other variations) is an Australian Aboriginal language from the Pilbara region of Western Australia. It is part of the Kanyara subgroup of the Pama–Nyungan language family.

It is spoken by the Thalanyji people. It is thought to be extinct; there were six speakers of Thalanyji recorded in 2004/5, but none since.

According to Peter Austin, Pinikura, Thalanyji, Payungu and Purdana "should probably be classified as belonging to the Kanyara subgroup".

== Phonology ==
=== Consonants ===
	Peripheral		Laminal		Apical	
	Labial	Velar	Dental	Palatal	Alveolar	Retroflex
Stop	b	ɡ	d̪	ɟ	d	ɖ
Nasal	m	ŋ	n̪	ɲ	n	ɳ
Lateral			l̪	ʎ	l	ɭ
Rhotic					r	
Approximant	w			j		ɻ

=== Vowels ===
	Front	Central	Back
High	i iː		u uː
Low		a aː	
