= Mantharta language =

Nearly extinct dialect cluster of Western Australia

Mantharta
- Region: Western Australia
- Ethnicity: Tharrkari, Wariangga, Tenma, Jiwarli, ?Malgaru
- Language family: Pama–Nyungan: Kanyara–Mantharta; Mantharta
- Dialects: Dhargari; Warriyangga; Dhiin; Jiwarli

Language codes
- ISO 639-3: Variously: dhr – Dhargari wri – Warriyangga iin – Thiin dze – Djiwarli
- Glottolog: mant1266
- AIATSIS: W21 Tharrkari, W22 Warriyangka, W25 Thiin, W28 Jiwarli
- Mantharta languages (green) among other Pama–Nyungan (tan).

Mantharta is a dialect cluster of Australian Aboriginal languages spoken in the southern Pilbara region of Western Australia.

== Dialects ==
There are four varieties, which are distinct but largely mutually intelligible. The four are:

- Tharrgari (Tharrkari, Dhargari), still spoken c. 2005
- Warriyangka (Wadiwangga), still spoken c. 1973
- Thiin (Thiinma), still spoken as of 2026
- Jiwarli (Tjiwarli), extinct 1986

The name mantharta comes from the word for "man" in all four varieties.

== Language revival ==
As of 2020, Warriyangga is one of 20 languages prioritised as part of the Priority Languages Support Project, being undertaken by First Languages Australia and funded by the Department of Communications and the Arts. The project aims to "identify and document critically-endangered languages — those languages for which little or no documentation exists, where no recordings have previously been made, but where there are living speakers".

== Phonology ==
=== Consonants ===
Consonants in the Thargari dialect
	Peripheral		Laminal		Apical	
	Labial	Velar	Dental	Palatal	Alveolar	Retroflex
Plosive	p/b	k/ɡ	t̪/d̪	c/ɟ	t/d	ʈ/ɖ
Nasal	m	ŋ	n̪	ɲ	n	ɳ
Rhotic					ɾ	
Lateral			l̪	ʎ	l	ɭ
Approximant	w			j		ɻ

- /d̪/ can also be lenited as a fricative [ð] in intervocalic positions.
- /ɾ/ can also be heard as a trill [r].

Consonants in all other dialects
	Peripheral		Laminal		Apical	
	Labial	Velar	Dental	Palatal	Alveolar	Retroflex
Plosive	p	k	t̪	c	t	ʈ
Nasal	m	ŋ	n̪	ɲ	n	ɳ
Rhotic					ɾ	
Lateral			l̪	ʎ	l	ɭ
Approximant	w			j		ɻ

- Stops may also be voiced as [b, ɡ, d̪, ɟ, d, ɖ] in medial position.

=== Vowels ===
	Front	Back
Close	i, iː	u, uː
Open	a, aː	
