= Gill Pinnacle =

Inselberg in Western Australia

- Location within Australia

Highest point
- Elevation: 801 m (2,628 ft)
- Coordinates: 24°53′29″S 128°46′31″E

Geography
- Location: Western Australia
- Parent range: Petermann Ranges

Geology
- Mountain type: inselberg

Gill Pinnacle (or Gill's Pinnacle) is an inselberg located in the far east of Western Australia, on the Ngaanyatjarra Lands. It is part of the Petermann Ranges. It consists of a dome-shaped hill, surrounded by dense mulga; its top is bare rock. The hill has been useful as a landmark, because it marks the location of one of the area's most reliable freshwater rockholes, Gordon's Springs. This is located a few hundred metres to the north of the rock.

The area is called Kutjuṉṯari (also spelled Kudjuṉṯari or Kutjurntari) in Pitjantjatjara and Ngaanyatjarra.

The first European people to visit the area were the explorers Ernest Giles and W. H. Tietkens, in 1874. They saw the rock from Weld Pass, which is further to the west. Giles named the rock after his brother-in-law, and the waterhole, Gordon's Springs, after his nephew. The closest town to Gill's Pinnacle is Kaltukatjara, which is about 31 kilometres (19 mi) to the east in the Northern Territory.

== See also ==
- Mount Augustus, Western Australia
