= Edmund River =

River in Western Australia

Edmund
- Etymology: Admiral Sir Edmund Lyons

Location
- Country: Australia
- State: Western Australia
- Region: Gascoyne

Physical characteristics
- Source: runoff from the Barlee and Minnierra Ranges
  - location: north of Barlee Range
  - coordinates: 23°35′14″S 116°22′29″E
  - elevation: 423 m (1,388 ft)
- Mouth: confluence with the Lyons River
  - location: east of Oakey Rock
  - coordinates: 23°59′3″S 116°1′44″E
  - elevation: 293 m (961 ft)
- Length: 85 km (53 mi)

Basin features
- River system: Gascoyne River
- Tributaries
  - left: Edmund Claypan Creek, Donald Creek, Rock Hole Creek, Dingo Creek (Western Australia)
  - right: Dundagee Creek, Bobbamindagee Creek

The Edmund River is a river in the Gascoyne region of Western Australia.

The headwaters of the Edmund rise north of the Barlee Range. The river flows south-west joined by the Dundagee, Edmund Claypan, Bobbamindagee, Rock Hole, Dingo and Donald Creeks until it forms its confluence with the Lyons River. The Lyons continues until it flows into the Gascoyne River. The river descends 130 metres (430 ft) over its 85-kilometre (53 mi) course.

The first European to discover the river was explorer Francis Gregory in 1858. The river was named by Surveyor General John Septimus Roe after the naval hero Admiral Sir Edmund Lyons.

== See also ==
- List of watercourses in Western Australia
