= Pinikura language =

Extinct Australian Aboriginal language

Pinikura
- Binigura, Pinigura
- Native to: Australia
- Region: Western Australia
- Ethnicity: Binigura
- Extinct: late 20th century
- Language family: Pama–Nyungan: Kanyara–Mantharta; Kanyara; Pinikura

Language codes
- ISO 639-3: pnv
- Glottolog: pini1244
- AIATSIS: W34
- ELP: Pinikura

Pinikura (Pinigura, Binigura, Binnigoora) is an extinct Australian Aboriginal language formerly spoken along the Ashburton River in the state of Western Australia by the Binigura. It is closely related to Thalanyji, which all Binigura now speak. Ten speakers of Pinikura were recorded in 1975, but none since then.
