= Djiwali =

Indigenous people of the Pilbara region of Western Australia

The Djiwarli, also written Jiwarli, are an Aboriginal Australian people of the Pilbara region of Western Australia.

== Language ==
The Jiwarli speak one of four dialects of Mantharta, the other members of the dialect continuum being the Thiin, Warriyangka and Tharrkari.

== Country ==
In Norman Tindale's estimation the Dyiwali's lands extended over 1,700 square miles (4,400 km^{2}), taking in the headwaters of Henry and Yannarie rivers, and running southeast from Mt Hamlet and Mt Florry as far as the Lyons River. Their northeastern reaches touched only as far as the Ashburton River divide.

== Alternative names ==
- Jivali
- Jiwali
- Tivali
- Tjiwali (Note: To be distinguished from Tjiwaling, an ethnonym used of Walmadjari by their western neighbours. (Tindale 1974, p. 241))

Source: Tindale 1974, p. 241

== Sources ==
- "AIATSIS map of Indigenous Australia". AIATSIS. 14 May 2024.
- Austin, Peter (2015). A Grammar of the Mantharta Languages, Western Australia. School of Oriental and African Studies.
- "Tindale Tribal Boundaries" (PDF). Department of Aboriginal Affairs, Western Australia. September 2016. Archived from the original (PDF) on 8 March 2016.
- Tindale, Norman Barnett (1974). "Djiwali (WA)". Aboriginal Tribes of Australia: Their Terrain, Environmental Controls, Distribution, Limits, and Proper Names. Australian National University Press. ISBN 978-0-708-10741-6. Archived from the original on 20 March 2020.
