= Malgaru =

Aboriginal Australian people group

The Malgaru were an Aboriginal Australian people of Western Australia. They might have been a subgroup of the Wariangga.

== Country ==
The Malgaru ranged over, in Norman Tindale's estimation, some 4,500 square miles (12,000 km^{2}) of territory to the east of the Kennedy Range, and the hill lands east of the Lyons River. Their land took in the area running north from Gascoyne Junction north as far as the vicinity of Minnie Creek. They were also present at Eudamullah. Their southern extension ran close to Fossil Hill. Their neighbours on the western side of the Kennedy Range were the Maia. Top the northeast were the Ninanu, while directly east lay the Watjarri.

== People ==
The Malgaru were one of the tribes that refrained from introducing circumcision into their rites of initiation.

== Sources ==
- "AIATSIS map of Indigenous Australia". AIATSIS. 14 May 2024.
- "Tindale Tribal Boundaries" (PDF). Department of Aboriginal Affairs, Western Australia. September 2016. Archived from the original (PDF) on 8 March 2016.
- Gough, David; Shepherd, Ron (1995). Kennedy Range National Park (PDF). Vol. 11. Landscope. pp. 28–35.
- Tindale, Norman Barnett (1974). "Malgaru (WA)". Aboriginal Tribes of Australia: Their Terrain, Environmental Controls, Distribution, Limits, and Proper Names. Australian National University. ISBN 978-0-708-10741-6. Archived from the original on 20 March 2020.
