= Kanyara languages =

Pair of Aboriginal Australian languages

Kanyara
- Geographic distribution: Western Australia
- Linguistic classification: Pama–Nyungan: Kanyara–Mantharta; Kanyara
- Subdivisions: Burduna †; Thalanyji; Bayungu; Pinikura †

Language codes
- Glottolog: kany1246
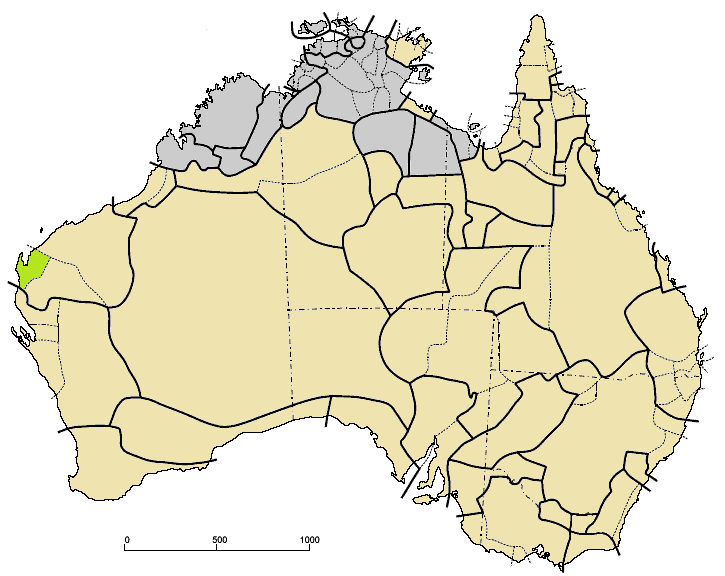
- Kanyara languages (green) among other Pama–Nyungan (tan).

The Kanyara languages are a pair of closely related languages in the southern Pilbara region of Western Australia.

According to Dixon, languages classified as members of the Kanyara languages group are (with the varieties in parentheses sometimes considered separate languages):

- Burduna (Bayungu/Payungu); and
- Thalanyji (Binigura/Pinikura).

However, according to Peter Austin, Binigura/Pinikura, Thalanyji, Payungu and Purdana (all classified as separate languages in AUSTLANG) "should probably be classified as belonging to the Kanyara subgroup".

The languages are spoken in the region between the mouths of the Gascoyne River and the Ashburton River, along the coast and extending inland.

The name kanyara comes from the word for "man" in Burdana and Thalanyji. The Kanyara languages form a branch of the Pama–Nyungan family. The Kanyara group was first proposed by Austin based on lexical, morphological and syntactic criteria.
