= Mount Augustus Station =

Pastoral lease in Western Australia

Coordinates: 24.308°S 116.909°E

Location in Western Australia

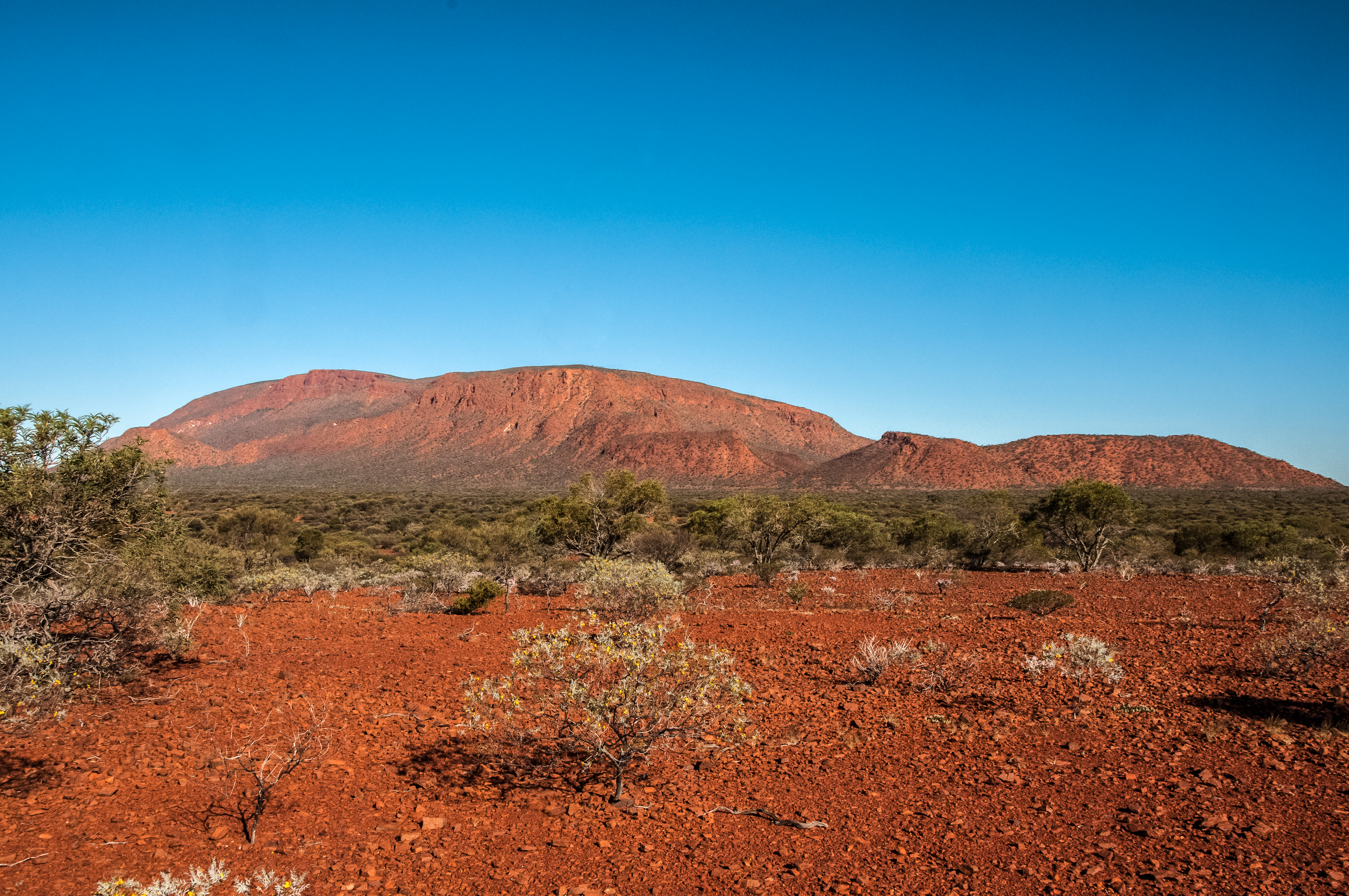
Mount Augustus

Mount Augustus Station is a pastoral lease that operates as a cattle station in Western Australia.

It is situated about 145 kilometres (90 mi) south west of Paraburdoo and 300 kilometres (186 mi) north west of Meekatharra in the Gascoyne region. The Upper Lyons River and Frederick River both run through the property, and the lease area once included Mount Augustus, which is claimed to be the largest monocline in the world. The property shares a border with Cobra Station.

The station was established in 1887 by Samuel James Phillips and John Hughes Phillips. In the early days of settlement the settlers suffered from constant attacks by the Indigenous peoples. In 1892 the station store was attacked and ransacked and a worker at the property was speared.

A gold rush started in the area in 1893, following reports of a good find. The reports proved to be exaggerated, with gold only to be found in a small area and the field was labeled a "duffer" and the diggers moved elsewhere.

In 1895 the station was owned by the Western Australian Mortgage and Agency Company and managed by Chas Mitchell.

The property was put up for auction in 1898, advertised as comprising 408,600 acres (165,355 ha) of prime fattening country suitable for carrying a herd of 5,000 cattle. The sale included 1,500 head of cattle and 70 horses.

The following year J. Phillips and Company owned the property along with Jimba Jimba Station. The property was being managed by one of the partners, Phil Ryan.

By 1909 the property was reported as having 10,000 head of cattle with the land in good condition following better than average rains.

Following the death of one of the partners in the company, Hugh Douglas Phillips, in 1921. The property was put up for auction again in 1923. It was advertised as encompassing an area of one million acres, 4,047 square kilometres (1,563 sq mi) and was stocked with 4,500 cattle. Stock could be watered by one of the 5 wells or by the Lyons, Frederick or Kurabukka River, which had two permanent pools.

In 2012 the owners of the station were the Hammarquist family. The family also operates the Mt Augustus Tourist Park, which offers accommodation, fuel and supplies to visitors. The property has thousands of tourists visit each year.

== See also ==
- List of pastoral leases in Western Australia
