= Frederick River =

River in Western Australia

Frederick
- Etymology: Frederick Roe, the son of John Septimus Roe

Location
- Country: Australia
- State: Western Australia
- Region: Gascoyne, Pilbara

Physical characteristics
- Source: Kenneth Range
  - location: Pilbara
  - coordinates: 23°56′59″S 117°9′57″E
  - elevation: 488 m (1,601 ft)
- Mouth: confluence with the Lyons River
  - location: Cobra Station homestead, Gascoyne
  - coordinates: 24°11′17″S 116°36′20″E
  - elevation: 357 m (1,171 ft)
- Length: 77 km (48 mi)
- Discharge
  - location: mouth

Basin features
- River system: Gascoyne River catchment
- Tributaries
  - left: Mulga Wash

The Frederick River is a river that is located in the Gascoyne and Pilbara regions of Western Australia.

The headwaters of the river rise in the Kenneth Range. The river flows in a south-westerly direction, joined by one minor tributary until it reaches its confluence with the Lyons River near Cobra Station homestead. The river descends 131 metres (430 ft) over 89 kilometres (55 mi) course.

The river was named in 1866 by the explorer Edward Hooley who was on expedition in the area after Frederick Roe, the son of John Septimus Roe.

== See also ==
- List of watercourses in Western Australia
