= Henry River (Western Australia) =

River in Western Australia

Coordinates: 22°40′16″S 115°40′17″E

Location
- Country: Australia

Physical characteristics
- Source
  - elevation: 308 metres (1,010 ft)
- Mouth
  - location: Ashburton River
  - elevation: 82 metres (269 ft)
- Length: 134 km (83 mi)

The Henry River is a river in the Pilbara region of Western Australia.

The headwaters of the river rise between High Range and Barlee Range. It flows in a northerly direction close to the western edge of the Barlee Range Nature Reserve, through Minnie Springs and discharges into the Ashburton River south-east of Nanutarra.

There are five tributaries of the river including Discovery Creek, Telfer River and Wannery Creek.

The river was named in 1866 by the pastoralist and explorer, E. T. Hooley when he found the river while creating a stock route from Perth to Roebourne. Hooley named the river after John Henry Monger, a merchant, from York.
