= Kennedy Range National Park =

National park in Western Australia

- IUCN category II (national park)
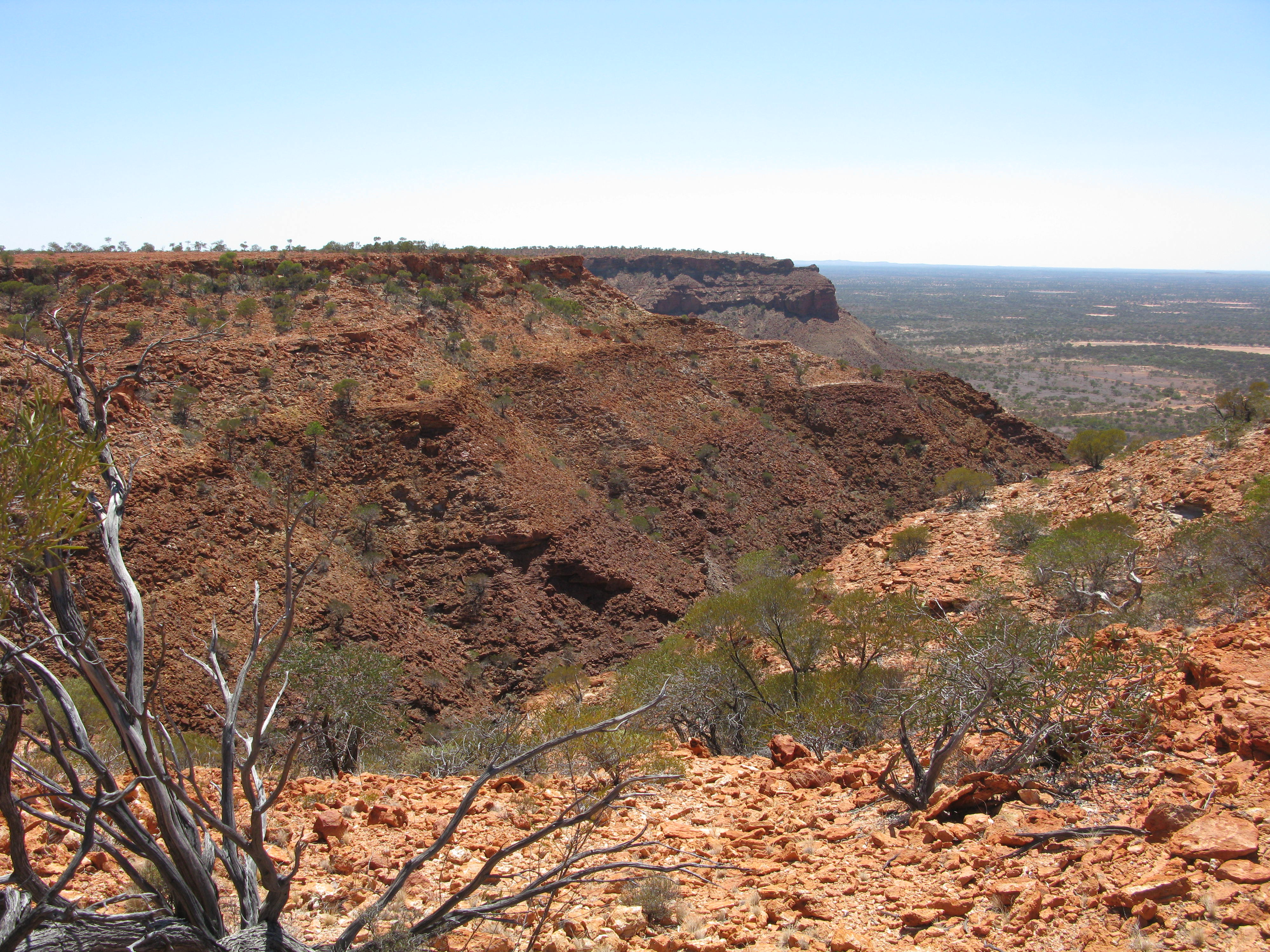
- Kennedy Range from Escarpment Trail

- Location within Western Australia
- Location: Western Australia
- Nearest city: Carnarvon
- Coordinates: 24°34′45″S 115°02′59″E
- Area: 1,416.6 km^{2} (547.0 sq mi)
- Established: 1993
- Governing body: Department of Biodiversity, Conservation and Attractions
- Website: Official website

Kennedy Range National Park is a national park in Gascoyne region of Western Australia, approximately 830 kilometres (520 mi) north of Perth and about 150 km (93 mi) east of Carnarvon.

Kennedy Range is found on the edge of the Gascoyne River catchment area and is a weathered plateau that extends for a distance of 150 km (93 mi), essentially forming a huge mesa. Spectacular sandstone cliffs can be found on the southern and eastern sides of the range, which are dissected by steep canyons which have an elevation of up to 100 metres (330 ft).

The Range formed a natural border for two Aboriginal peoples, the Maia and the Malgaru. Natural springs located on the edge of the ranges would have provided game to hunt and outcrops of chert would have provided stone for tools. Over 100 sites provide evidence that the Indigenous Australians inhabited the area for over 20,000 years prior to European settlement.

The first European to explore the area was Francis Thomas Gregory, whose expedition reached the range in 1858. Gregory named the range after the Governor of Western Australia at the time, Arthur Edward Kennedy. He also named the nearby Lyons River in the same expedition before continuing to Mount Augustus. Pastoralists arrived in the area shortly afterwards with Charles Brockman setting up Boolathana Station in 1877, and the region experienced success in wool production until the 1930s when the overgrazing, drought and the Great Depression caused most businesses to fail.

The valleys and plains of the range had been severely degraded but the range top was only slightly damaged as a result of pastoral activity. The area has been explored for minerals but has not been mined.

The park was officially gazetted in 1993 and contains some facilities for visitors. A bush toilet and camp-sites are located at Temple Gorge, but it is planned to relocate this camp ground. There are a number of walk trails within the park but no water is available. Entry to the park is free but camp-site fees apply.

A popular time to visit the park is following heavy rains when wildflowers emerge. Over 80 species of wildflower are known to inhabit the park, including mulla mulla, hakeas, eremophilas, Calytrix, verticordias and various everlasting daisies.

A species of lizard Lerista kennedyensis, commonly called the "Kennedy Range broad-blazed slider", is named after the Kennedy Range.

== See also ==
- Protected areas of Western Australia
