= Cobra Station =

Pastoral lease in Western Australia

Coordinates: 24.20034°S 116.47475°E

Location in Western Australia

Cobra Station is a pastoral lease and sheep station located in the Gascoyne region of Western Australia.

== Description ==
The station is situated approximately 164 kilometres (102 mi) south west of Paraburdoo and 334 miles (538 km) north west of Meekatharra. The station is bordered by Mount Augustus National Park, Mount Augustus Station, Mount Phillip and Gilford Stations. The property follows the Thomas River and has a snake-like shape, giving rise to its unusual name.

Portions of the Gascoyne Range and the Centipede Range are found within the station boundary, making it rugged country with steep ranges and stony hills. Narrow valley plains are found between sharp dissections, which are then surrounded by gently sloping plains. The property is dominated by low woodland and large areas of Mulga shrubland.

== History ==
Cobra was taken up by James Comtesse in 1906, who had owned the Euranna Hotel, which is now known as the Bangemall Inn. Comtesse and his wife Mary ran the lease until 1925 when Mary died. James had her buried near the Cobra homestead.

Following a drought in 1913 the property's flock was approximately 2,000 sheep. Good rains followed early the following year, but the property was again very dry over the winter. The sheep were also being regularly attacked by dogs.

The property was advertised as being for sale in 1927, and was acquired by Jack Edney, who then sold it in 1933. Alfred Ray Cream took over Cobra the same year, and shortly after his mother, Mary Jane Cream, died and was buried there. By 1934 Cobra was carrying a flock of 8,515 sheep. In 1938 Cream put the 156,197-acre (63,211 ha) property up for auction. Cobra was divided into 10 paddocks, had a 4-stand shearing shed, nine wells, two bores and one natural spring. It was stocked at the time with only 880 sheep but was advertised as being capable of carrying about 9.000. The property was acquired by Percy and Elise Fitzgerald early the following year. The lease changed hands again in 1948 to Benjamin Wilson. Wilson bought the Bangemall Inn, at that time no longer used as a hotel, and converted it to the homestead. The old homestead became the shearers' quarters. Wilson married Madeliene Potts, widow of the former manager of the adjacent property, Mount Augustus Station and Mrs Wilson contributed much of the Bangemall homestead garden development. The area of the lease grew three-fold during this period with the addition of cattle-grazing land to the south of Mount Augustus eventually extending well south of the Thomas River and the Pink Hills to the boundary with Mount James Station.

Bob and Maxine Bozanich acquired the lease in 1967 then sold in 1978 to Ken and Jill Gurney. The Gurney's encouraged the Lands Department to excise 10 square miles (26 km^{2}) surrounding Mount Augustus and this was eventually declared as a National Park. The property was sold again in 1980 to a Perth syndicate headed by Peter Eaton, who intended to develop a tourism venture at Cobra. Dennis and Alexa Lang then acquired Cobra in 1989; they used the homestead as a hotel and restocked the property.

== Homestead ==
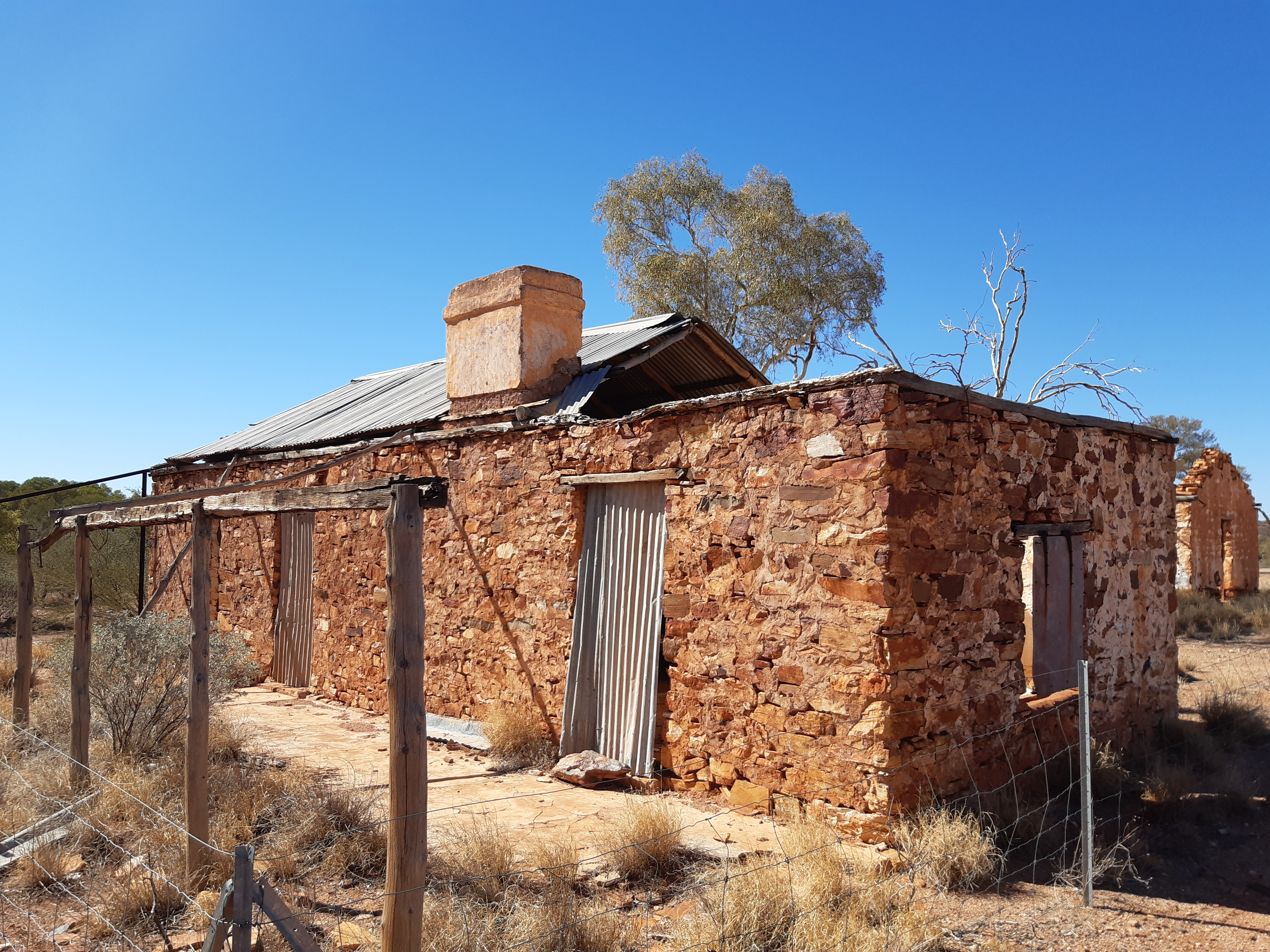
The ruins of the original Cobra Station Homestead in 2020

The current homestead is the Bangemall Inn, which was built in 1896 by Percy Aycliffe; at the time it was known as the Euranna Hotel. Built as an inn for travellers to and from the Bangemall goldfields, it was given its present name in 1910. The building has been used as the homestead at Cobra since 1949, and was classified by the National Trust in 1982. The building is one of only a few remaining wayside hotels left in the North West region. It has adobe walls with a hipped corrugated iron roof that extends down to a verandah supported by bush timber posts. It originally consisted of four rooms, including a stone kitchen, connected by a central corridor, and is surrounded by an established garden.

The original homestead was built in 1906 and is about 9 kilometres (6 mi) west of the current one and was itself placed on the heritage list in 2013. It is a simple stone building with a corrugated iron roof. Some bush timber posts remain of the verandah on the western side. The graves of both Mary Comtesse and Mary Jane Cream are located nearby.

== See also ==
- List of pastoral leases in Western Australia
