= Kanyara–Mantharta languages =

Branch of the Pama–Nyungan family

Kanyara–Mantharta
- Geographic distribution: North West Cape, Western Australia
- Linguistic classification: Pama–Nyungan: Southwest; Pilbara; Kanyara–Mantharta
- Subdivisions: Kanyara; Mantharta

Language codes
- Glottolog: None
- Kanyara–Mantharta languages (green) among other Pama–Nyungan (tan). Kanyara is the group on the coast, Mantharta inland.

The Kanyara and Mantharta languages form a western branch of the Pama–Nyungan family.
