= Lyons River =

River in Western Australia

Lyons Malgaru: Mithering
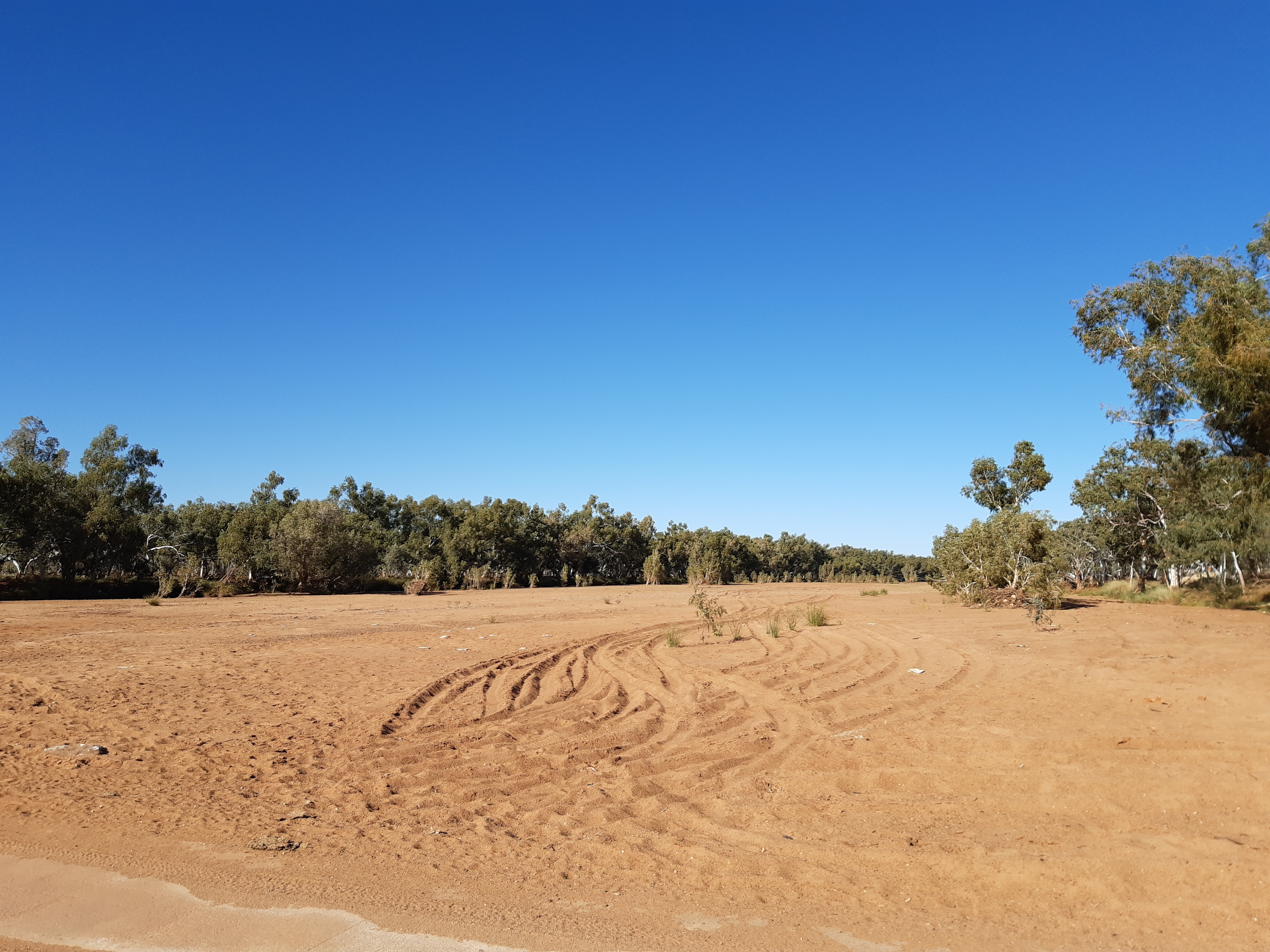
- The Lyons River at Ullawarra Road crossing
- Etymology: Admiral Sir Edmund Lyons

Location
- Country: Australia
- State: Western Australia
- Region: Gascoyne

Physical characteristics
- Source: Teano Range
  - location: below Staten Hill
  - coordinates: 24°26′42″S 117°35′55″E
  - elevation: 535 m (1,755 ft)
- Mouth: confluence with the Gascoyne River
  - location: Jimba Jimba
  - coordinates: 25°2′31″S 115°4′37″E
  - elevation: 137 m (449 ft)
- Length: 561 km (349 mi)
- Discharge
  - location: mouth
  - average: 460,600 m^{3}/s (16,270,000 cu ft/s)

Basin features
- River system: Gascoyne River catchment
- Tributaries
  - left: Calbrajacka Creek, Onslow Creek, Edmund River, Frederick River
  - right: Koorabooka Creek
- National park: Kennedy Range National Park

The Lyons River is a river in the Gascoyne region of Western Australia.

The headwaters of the Lyons rise just west of the Teano Range and the river flows generally south-west, joined by 36 tributaries including the Edmund River, Frederick River, Onslow Creek, Gifford Creek, Koorabooka Creek and Ulura Creek. The Lyons reaches its confluence with the Gascoyne River near the township of Gascoyne Junction near the southern end of the Kennedy Range. The river descends 398 metres (1,306 ft) over its 561-kilometre (349 mi) course.

Several permanent pools of water exist along the river including Cattle Pool, Windarrie Pool and Bubbawonnara Pool.

The Lyons River is known as Mithering by the local Aboriginal Australians, the Malgaru. The first European to come upon the river was explorer Francis Gregory in 1858. He named the river after the naval hero Admiral Sir Edmund Lyons.

== See also ==
- List of watercourses in Western Australia
