= Mount Augustus (Western Australia) =

Prominent inselberg in Western Australia

Coordinates: 24.3250°S 116.8417°E

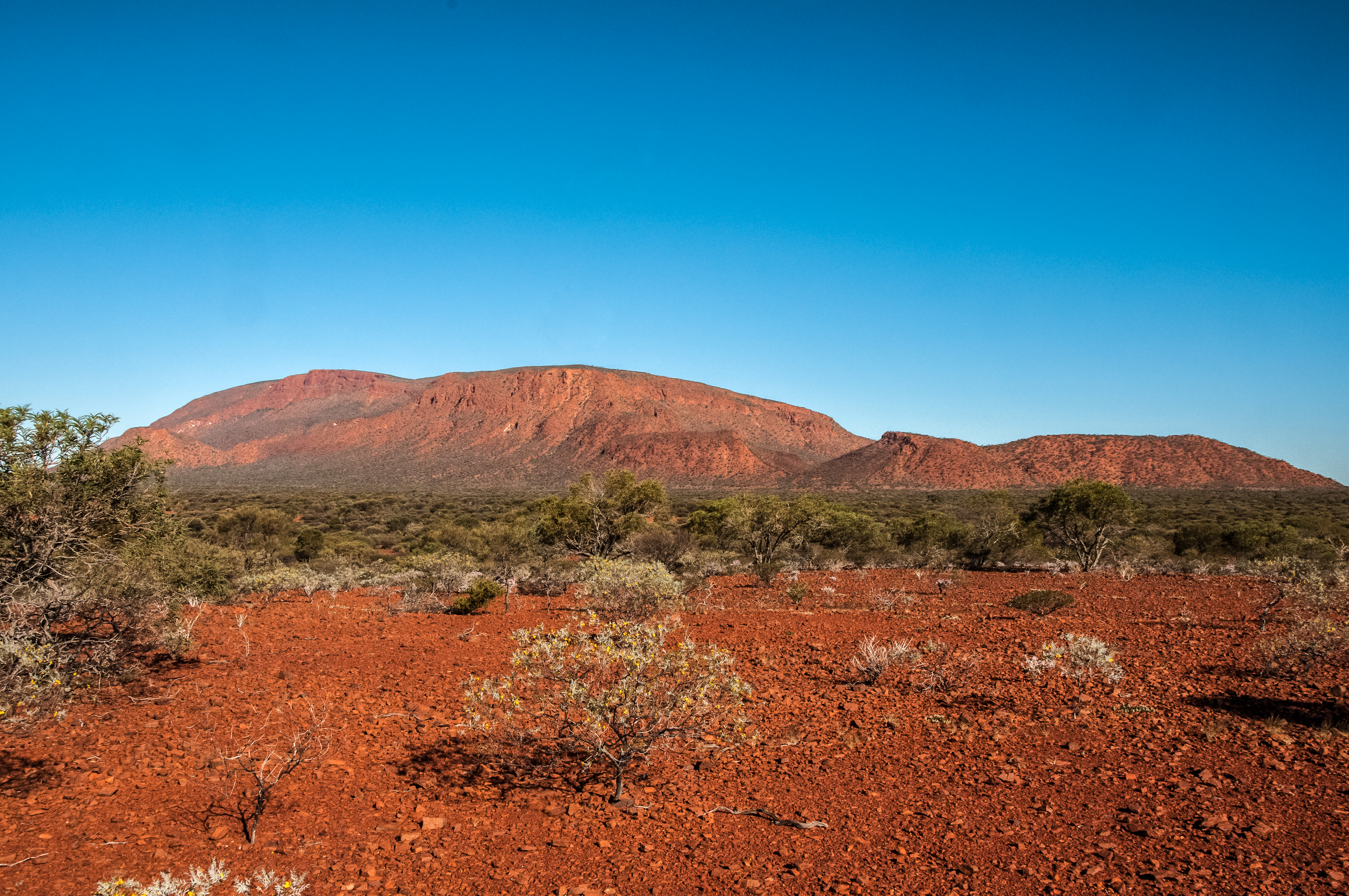
Mount Augustus

Mount Augustus is located roughly 1,000 kilometres (620 mi) north of Perth, in the Mount Augustus National Park in Western Australia. The name is also given to the neighbouring pastoral lease, Mount Augustus Station. The local Wadjari people call it Burringurrah, after a Dreamtime figure, a young boy who was speared and turned into a rock. It has been a sacred site for thousands of years.

It is a prominent inselberg that stands 1,106 metres (3,629 ft) above sea level, and approximately 858 metres (2,815 ft) above the surrounding plain, and covers an area of 4,795 hectares (11,850 acres). It has a central ridge which is almost eight kilometres (5 mi) long.

== Monolith–Anticline distinction ==
Mount Augustus is widely claimed in tourist promotional and information literature as the "world's largest monolith", but the claim does not originate from the geological literature, nor is it substantiated by any other scholarly research.

Mount Augustus is more than twice the size of Uluru. Unlike Uluru, which is a monolith and, in general, devoid of plant growth, Mount Augustus is an asymmetrical anticline.

According to the Geological Survey of Western Australia, Mount Augustus is an asymmetrical anticline (rock layers that have been folded into an arch-like structure) which is steeper on its north-eastern side than the south-west.

The rocks consist of sand and gravel that were deposited by an ancient, south-easterly flowing river system that drained the region about 1,600 million years ago. This river system flowed over a faulted and eroded surface of 1,800–1,620 million-year-old granitic and metamorphic rocks. The river deposits consolidated to form sandstone and conglomerate, and were then buried beneath younger marine sediments, which were laid down when shallow seas covered the region between 1,600–1,070 million years ago.

The rocks were buckled into their present-day structure about 900 million years ago when movement along faults in the underlying granitic and metamorphic rocks caused localised, strong, north-east directed compression. The marine sedimentary rocks that overlay the sandstone and conglomerate have since been eroded from Mount Augustus, but now form the hills around Cobra and Mount Augustus homesteads. Erosion has also removed sandstone and conglomerate from the north-western end of Mount Augustus to expose the underlying granitic rocks at The Pound.

== 1894 gold rush ==
There was a gold rush in the 1890s due to local geology.

== Flora and fauna ==
Wattles, cassias and eremophilas dominate the plant life and the animal life include emus, red kangaroos, goannas, euros and birds of prey. There are over 100 species of birds on and around Mount Augustus.

== Walking tracks ==
The climb to the summit and back can take up to five hours, and there are two trails (one a class 4 and the other a class 5) to get there. There are a number of walking tracks to explore.

There have been a number of deaths on the summit walking trail. An inquest into the deaths by government authorities suggests to close the summit trail between September and March for the sake of unwary hikers who do not appreciate the treacherous conditions.

== Aboriginal history and rock engravings ==
Evidence of early Aboriginal habitation is depicted in the rock engravings around Mount Augustus. Many of the Dreamtime stories of the local Aboriginal Wajarri people can be viewed in the rock engravings at Mundee, Ooramboo and Beedoboondu. All of these are accessible on the loop walking trail.

== See also ==
- Gill Pinnacle

== Sources ==
- Brennan-Mills, Maddison (21 November 2026). "Geography Facts That'll Completely Ruin Every Map You've Ever Trusted". News.com.au. "Mount Augustus, known as Burringurrah to the local Wajarri people, [...] is more than twice the size of Uluru and billed as the biggest rock in the world. Geologists argue it isn't technically one single rock, [...] Geoscience Australia puts Mount Augustus at 858 m [2,815 ft] above the surrounding plain and Uluru at 345 m [1,132 ft]."
