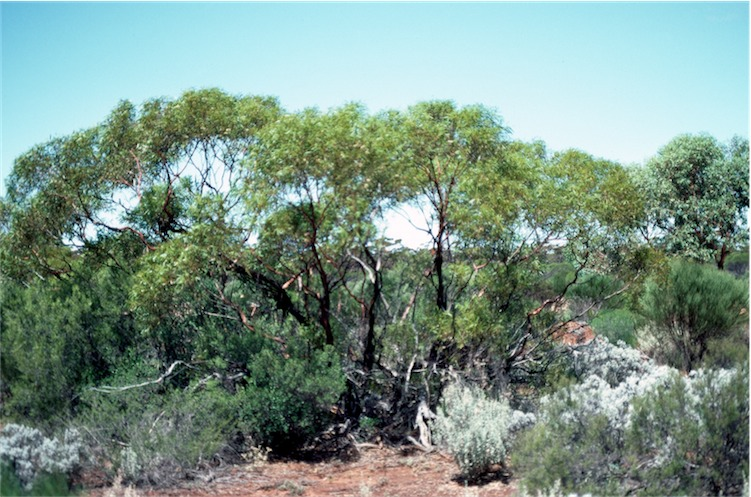
- Eucalyptus effusa near Balladonia

Scientific classification
- Kingdom: Plantae
- Clade: Embryophytes
- Clade: Tracheophytes
- Clade: Spermatophytes
- Clade: Angiosperms
- Clade: Eudicots
- Clade: Rosids
- Order: Myrtales
- Family: Myrtaceae
- Genus: Eucalyptus
- Species: E. effusa

Binomial name
- Eucalyptus effusa Brooker

= Eucalyptus effusa =

Rough-barked gimlet

Species of eucalyptus endemic to Western Australia

Eucalyptus effusa, commonly known as rough-barked gimlet, is a species of mallee or small tree that is endemic to Western Australia. It has thin, rough bark on the base of the trunk, smooth bark above, linear to narrow lance-shaped adult leaves, flower buds arranged in groups of seven, white flowers and cup-shaped to conical fruit.

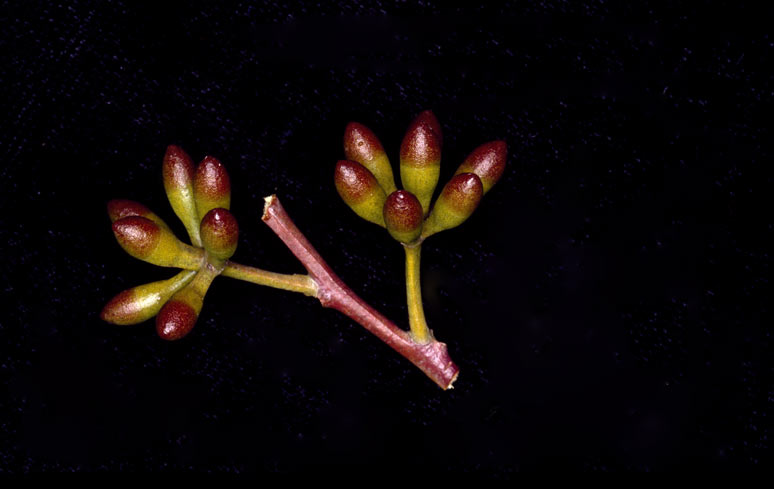
Flower buds

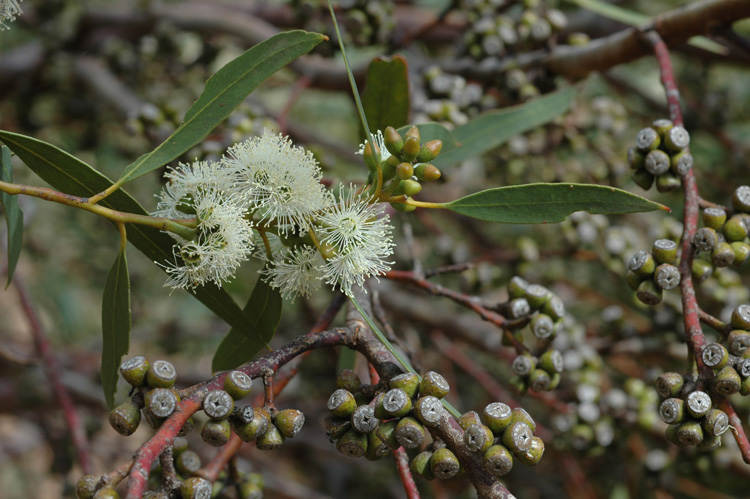
Flowers and fruit

== Description ==
Eucalyptus effusa is a mallee or small tree that typically grows to a height of 2 to 6 metres (7 to 20 ft) and forms a lignotuber. It has persistent, thin ribbony bark on the trunk, sometimes on the lower branches and smooth brownish bark above. Young plants and coppice regrowth have lance-shaped to curved leaves that are 55–115 mm (2.2–4.5 in) long and 5–50 mm (0.20–1.97 in) wide and petiolate. Adult leaves are linear to narrow lance-shaped, usually the same glossy green on both sides, 50–125 mm (2.0–4.9 in) long and 5–20 mm (0.20–0.79 in) wide on a petiole 5–18 mm (0.20–0.71 in) long. The flower buds are arranged in groups of seven in leaf axils on a peduncle 4–15 mm (0.16–0.59 in) long, the individual buds on a pedicel 1–3 mm (0.039–0.118 in) long. Mature buds are oval to more or less cylindrical, 6–8 mm (0.24–0.31 in) long and 3–5 mm (0.12–0.20 in) wide with a conical operculum. Flowering mainly occurs from October to March and the flowers are white. The fruit is a woody cup-shaped to conical capsule 4–6 mm (0.16–0.24 in) long and 4–7 mm (0.16–0.28 in) wide with the valves at rim level or extended beyond it.

== Taxonomy and naming ==
Eucalyptus effusa was first formally described in 1976 by the botanist Ian Brooker who published the description in the journal Nuytsia. The type specimen was collected by George Chippendale between Norseman and Balladonia in 1967.

In 1991, Lawrie Johnson and Ken Hill described two subspecies that have been accepted by the Australian Plant Census and the descriptions were published in the journal Telopea:

- Eucalyptus effusa Brooker subsp. effusa, commonly known as rough-barked gimlet, has a conical operculum;
- Eucalyptus effusa subsp. exsul, commonly known as desert gimlet, has a rounded operculum and slightly glaucous branchlets.

E. effusa is one of the nine true gimlet species that have buds in groups of seven, and the only gimlet that is a mallee. The other true gimlets are E. campaspe, E. creta, E. diptera, E. jimberlanica, E. ravida, E. terebra, E. salubris and E. tortilis.

== Distribution and habitat ==
Rough-barked gimlet is found on stony rises and plains between the Fraser Range and Balladonia in the Coolgardie and Nullarbor biogeographic regions of Western Australia where it grows in shallow sandy or loamy soils over greenstone or laterite.

Desert gimlet is only known from a small area near Youanmi.

== Conservation status ==
Both subspecies of Eucalyptus effusa are classified as "not threatened" by the Western Australian Government Department of Parks and Wildlife.

== See also ==
- List of Eucalyptus species
