= Balladonia (disambiguation) =

Balladonia is a small community in Western Australia (WA).

Balladonia may also refer to:

== Plants ==
- Balladonia (plant), a genus of plant of which some species were initially allocated to the genus Leucophyta
- Eucalyptus fraseri, a.k.a. Balladonia gum, a species of eucalypt found in WA
- Eucalyptus balladoniensis, a.k.a. Balladonia mallee, a species of eucalypt found in WA
- Eucalyptus terebra, or Balladonia gimlet, a species of eucalypt found in WA

== Other uses ==
- Balladonia (horse), a British thoroughbred horse, dam of Wootton Bassett
- Balladonia Land District, a cadastral division in Western Australia, in which the town is located
- Balladonia Station, a pastoral lease near the town
