= Fraser Range Station =

Pastoral lease in Western Australia

Coordinates: 32°02′09″S 122°48′08″E

Location in Western Australia

Fraser Range Station is a pastoral lease and sheep station located about 100 kilometres (62 mi) east of Norseman on the Eyre Highway in the Goldfields-Esperance region of Western Australia.

The area was visited in 1870 by John and Alexander Forrest on their expedition to Adelaide. The property has a length of 160 kilometres (99 mi) and occupies an area of approximately 500,000 acres (2,023 km^{2}).

In 1891–1892 the Elder Scientific Exploring Expedition visited the station.

The photographic record from the expedition included many photographs of local people.

Located on the western fringe of the Nullarbor Plain the station largely bears little resemblance to the Nullarbor proper. Dense eucalypt hardwood forest dominates much of the area. The trees grow to a height of 20 to 30 metres (66 to 98 ft) and are surrounded by a dense undergrowth. From the trees the granite Fraser range rises, the highest point being Mount Pleasant, with an elevation of 679 metres (2,228 ft).

The station is to the west of the Nanambinia, Balladonia, and Noondonia stations, which lie to the north and south of Eyre Highway.

The Dempster brothers were the first settlers on the station and arrived in 1872; the station was referred to as "Dempster's Fraser Range Station" in records from the 1890s.

== See also ==
- List of ranches and stations
