= Gimlet (eucalypt) =

Group of eucalypts

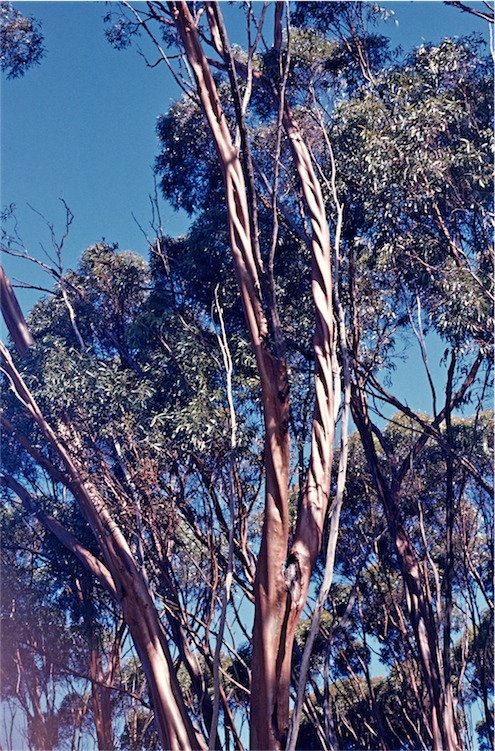
Trunk of the gimlet Eucalyptus salubris

A gimlet is one of nine species of eucalypt in the genus Eucalyptus, series Contortae. These species are mainly characterised by having smooth, shiny, fluted trunks. The most widely distributed of the gimlets, is E. salubris which is found throughout the south-west of Western Australia, other than in coastal areas and wet forests. The other eight species have a narrower distribution in the Goldfields-Esperance region. The only gimlet that is a mallee is E. effusa which forms a lignotuber from which it can resprout after fire. The other eight gimlets are mallets, do not form a lignotuber, are killed by fire and regenerate from seed. These species are E. campaspe, E. creta, E. diptera, E. jimberlanica, E. ravida, E. terebra, E. salubris and E. tortilis.
