= Eucalyptus tortilis =

Scientific classification
- Kingdom: Plantae
- Clade: Tracheophytes
- Clade: Angiosperms
- Clade: Eudicots
- Clade: Rosids
- Order: Myrtales
- Family: Myrtaceae
- Genus: Eucalyptus
- Species: E. tortilis

Binomial name
- Eucalyptus tortilis L.A.S.Johnson & K.D.Hill

Species of eucalyptus

Eucalyptus tortilis is a species of mallet and a gimlet that is endemic to the southwest of Western Australia. It has smooth bark, lance-shaped adult leaves, flower buds in groups of seven, creamy white flowers and hemispherical to cup-shaped fruit.

== Description ==
Eucalyptus tortilis is a mallet and a gimlet, that typically grows to a height of 5–10 m (16–33 ft), has fluted stems and does not form a lignotuber. It has smooth, shiny greenish or copper-coloured bark. The adult leaves are the same shade of glossy green on both sides, lance-shaped, 55–95 mm (2.2–3.7 in) long and 7–18 mm (0.28–0.71 in) wide tapering to a petiole 8–18 mm (0.31–0.71 in) long. The flower buds are arranged in leaf axils in groups of seven on an unbranched peduncle up to 10 mm (0.39 in) long, the individual buds on pedicels up to 3 mm (0.12 in) long. Mature buds are an elongated oval shape, 10–14 mm (0.39–0.55 in) long and 4–6 mm (0.16–0.24 in) wide with a conical to beaked operculum. Flowering occurs in May and the flowers are creamy white.

== Taxonomy and naming ==
Eucalyptus tortilis was first formally described in 1991 by Lawrie Johnson and Ken Hill in the journal Telopea from specimens collected east of Norseman in 1983. The specific epithet (tortilis) is a Latin word meaning "twisted", referring to the twisted gimlet trunk.

E. tortilis is one of the nine gimlet species. Six of these, including E. tortilis have buds in groups of seven, the others being E. campaspe, the mallee E. effusa, E. jimberlanica, E. salubris, E. ravida and E. terebra. The other three gimlets have flower buds in groups of three.

== Distribution and habitat ==
This gimlet is found on flats and rises between Kalgoorlie and Esperance in the Goldfields-Esperance region where it grows in calcareous loamy soils.

== Conservation status ==
This eucalypt is classified as "not threatened" by the Western Australian Government Department of Parks and Wildlife.

== See also ==
- List of Eucalyptus species
