= Eucalyptus histophylla =

Conservation status
- Priority Three — Poorly Known Taxa (DEC)

Scientific classification
- Kingdom: Plantae
- Clade: Tracheophytes
- Clade: Angiosperms
- Clade: Eudicots
- Clade: Rosids
- Order: Myrtales
- Family: Myrtaceae
- Genus: Eucalyptus
- Species: E. histophylla

Binomial name
- Eucalyptus histophylla Brooker & Hopper

Species of eucalyptus

Eucalyptus histophylla is a species of mallee or small tree that is endemic to southern Western Australia. It has smooth bark, often with ribbons of shed bark, linear to narrow lance-shaped adult leaves, flower buds arranged in groups in leaf axils, white flowers and cylindrical to barrel-shaped or conical fruit.

== Description ==
Eucalyptus histophylla is a mallee or small tree that typically grows to a height of 2–6 m (6 ft 7 in – 19 ft 8 in) and forms a lignotuber. It has smooth, greyish or pale brownish bark, usually with hanging ribbons of shed bark. Young plants and coppice regrowth have leaves that are oblong to lance-shaped, up to 11 mm (0.43 in) long and 4 mm (0.16 in) wide. Adult leaves are linear to narrow lance-shaped, the same shade of green on both sides, 65–125 mm (2.6–4.9 in) long and 6–16 mm (0.24–0.63 in) wide on a petiole 8–18 mm (0.31–0.71 in) long. The flower buds are arranged in leaf axils on a peduncle 8–20 mm (0.31–0.79 in) long, the individual buds on pedicels 2–4 mm (0.079–0.157 in) long. Mature buds are shaped like long, thin spindles 20–30 mm (0.79–1.18 in) long and about 4 mm (0.16 in) wide with a horn-shaped operculum two or three times longer than the floral cup. Flowering occurs between December and January and the flowers are pale yellow. The fruit is a woody cylindrical to barrel-shaped or conical capsule 8–11 mm (0.31–0.43 in) long and 5–7 mm (0.20–0.28 in) wide with the valves near rim level.

== Taxonomy and naming ==
Eucalyptus histophylla was first formally described in 1991 by Ian Brooker and Stephen Hopper from a specimen collected by Hopper between Balladonia and Norseman. The description was published in the journal Nuytsia and the specific epithet is from the Greek histos, 'upright', and phyllon, 'leaf', referring to the erect leaves.

== Distribution and habitat ==
This eucalypt grows in sandy-loam soils among granite outcrops or in laterite, between the Fraser Range and Balladonia, sometimes in areas further south, in the Avon Wheatbelt, Coolgardie, Mallee and Nullarbor Plain biogeographic regions.

== Conservation status ==
Eucalyptus histophylla is classified as "Priority Three" by the Western Australian Government Department of Parks and Wildlife meaning that it is poorly known and known from only a few locations but is not under imminent threat.

== See also ==
- List of Eucalyptus species
