= Leioproctus rugosus =

Scientific classification
- Kingdom: Animalia
- Phylum: Arthropoda
- Clade: Pancrustacea
- Class: Insecta
- Order: Hymenoptera
- Family: Colletidae
- Genus: Leioproctus
- Species: L. rugosus

Binomial name
- Leioproctus rugosus Maynard 2013

Synonyms
- Goniocolletes rugosus Maynard, 2013

Species of bee

Leioproctus rugosus, or Leioproctus (Goniocolletes) rugosus, is a species of bee in the family Colletidae and subfamily Colletinae. It is endemic to Australia. It was described by Australian entomologist Glynn Maynard in 2013.

== Etymology ==
The specific epithet rugosus (Latin: "skinny") refers to the relatively slender metasoma of the females.

== Description ==
Female body length is about 12 mm. Integumental colouration is mainly black, the metasoma orange. The hair is white to pale brown.

== Distribution and habitat ==
The species occurs in southern Western Australia. The type locality is Balladonia.

== Behaviour ==
The adults are flying mellivores.
