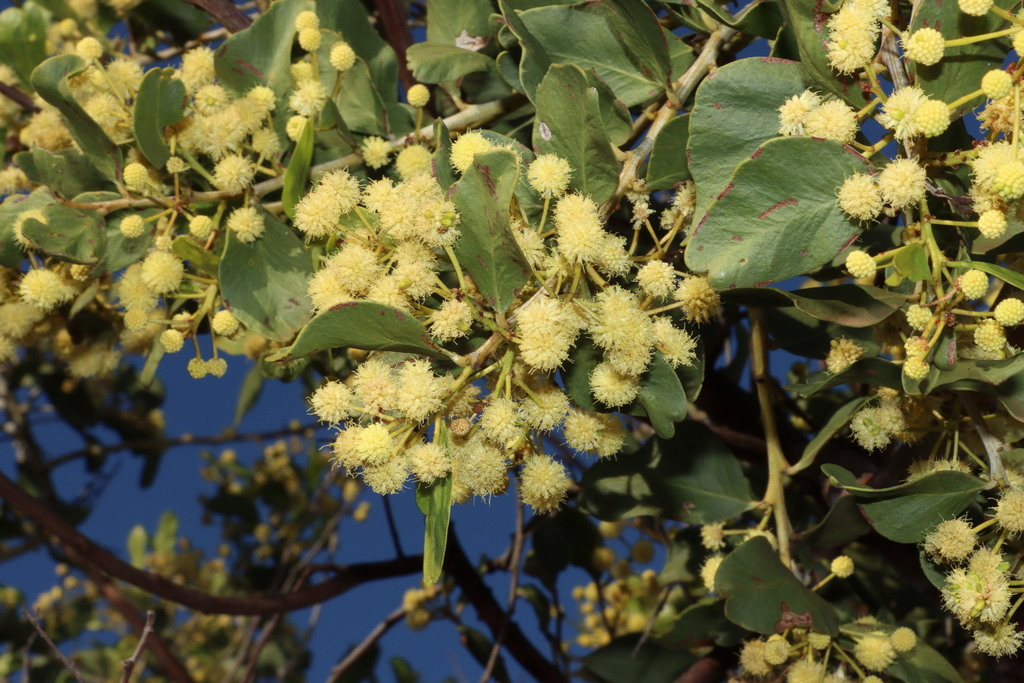

Scientific classification
- Kingdom: Plantae
- Clade: Tracheophytes
- Clade: Angiosperms
- Clade: Eudicots
- Clade: Rosids
- Order: Fabales
- Family: Fabaceae
- Subfamily: Caesalpinioideae
- Clade: Mimosoid clade
- Genus: Acacia
- Species: A. chartacea

Binomial name
- Acacia chartacea Maslin
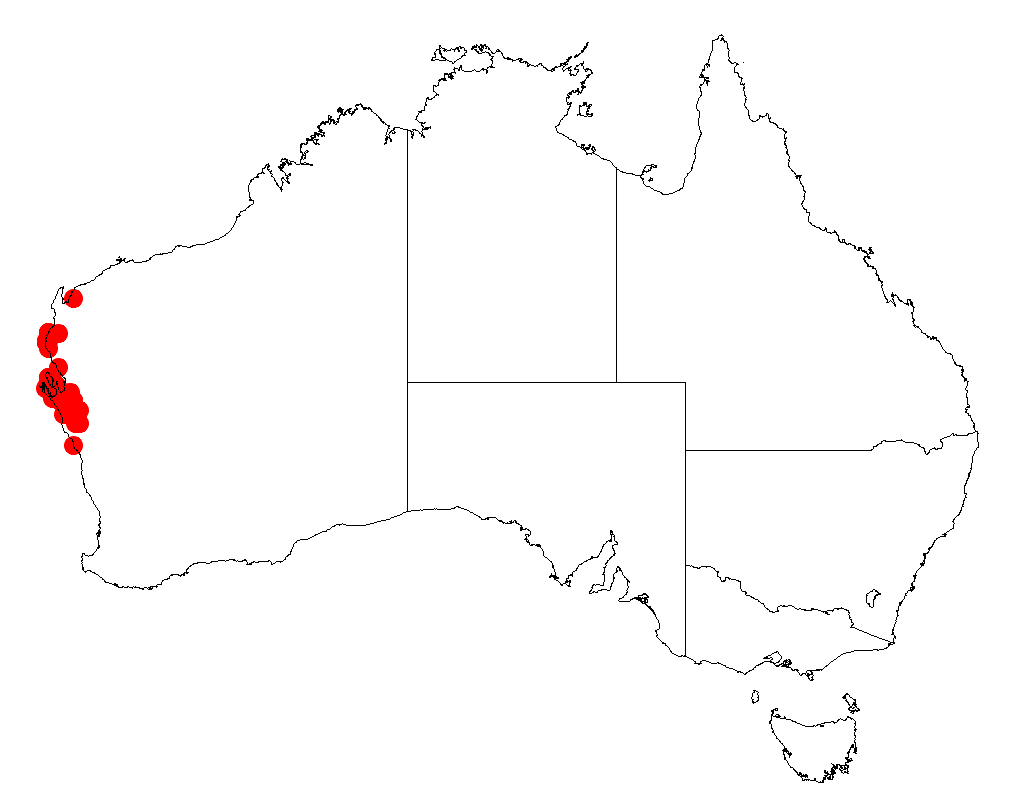
- Occurrence data from AVH

Synonyms
- Racosperma chartaceum (Maslin) Pedley

= Acacia chartacea =

Species of legume

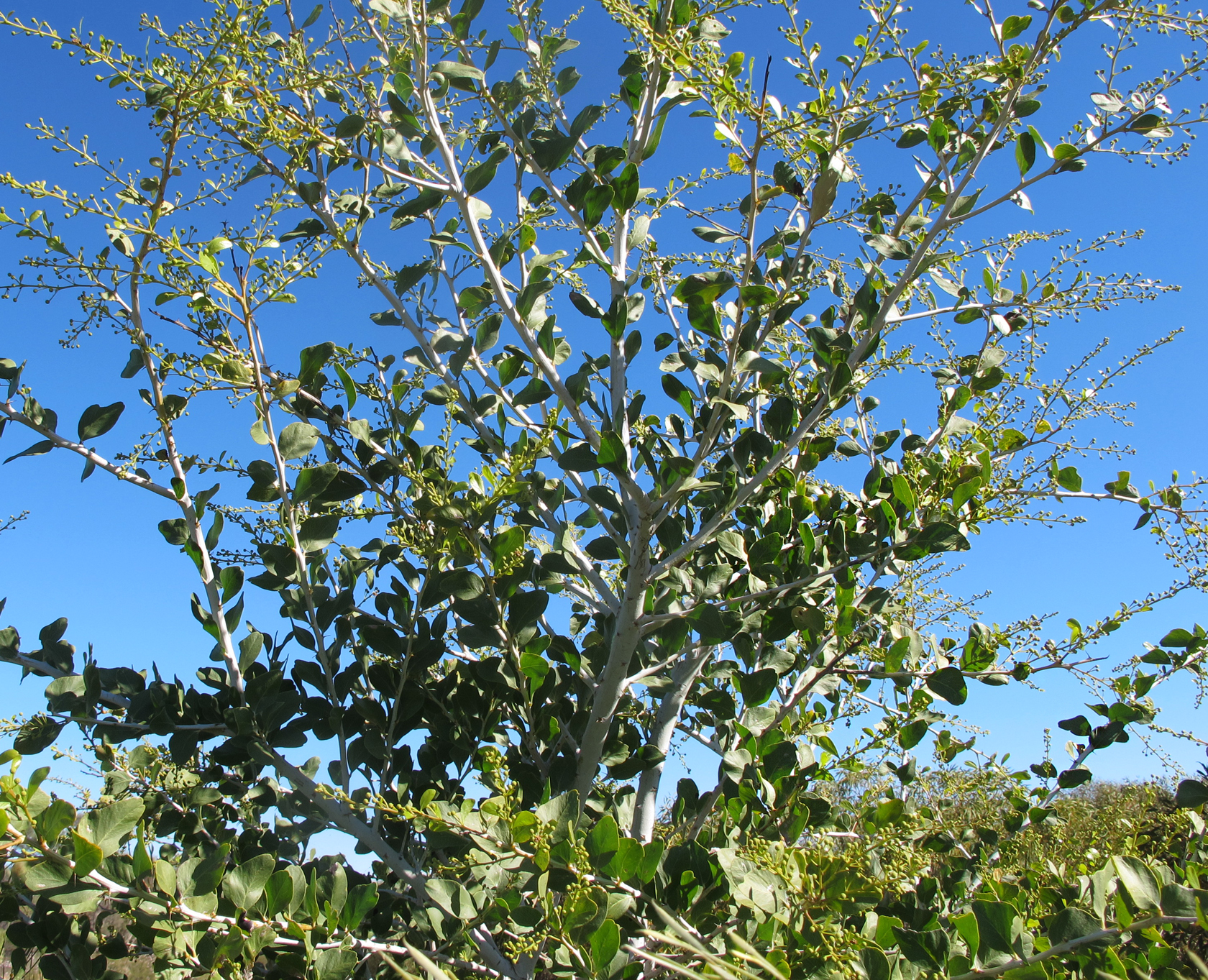
Plant in bud

Acacia chartacea is a species of flowering plant in the family Fabaceae and is endemic to an area along the west coast of Western Australia. It is an erect or straggly, glabrous shrub or tree with slightly asymmetrical, more or less egg-shaped to elliptic phyllodes, spherical heads of cream-coloured to pale lemon yellow flowers, and papery, narrowly oblong pods.

== Description ==
Acacia chartacea is an erect or straggly, glabrous shrub or tree that typically grows to a height of 1.5–4 m (4 ft 11 in – 13 ft 1 in), sometimes as high as 6 m (20 ft). Its branches and branchlets are covered with a white, powdery bloom. The phyllodes are slightly elliptic, more or less egg-shaped to elliptic or narrowly elliptic, 2.5–5.5 mm (0.098–0.217 in) long, 1.0–2.5 mm (0.039–0.098 in) wide and leathery with a prominent midrib and a gland near the base of the phyllodes. There are sometimes spiny stipules at the base of the phyllodes, but are often absent on mature plants. The flowers are borne in spherical heads in racemes 30–80 mm (1.2–3.1 in) long on peduncles 8–15 mm (0.31–0.59 in) long. Each head contains 60 to 90 cream-coloured to pale lemon yellow flowers. Flowering occurs from August to January and the pods are narrowly oblong and papery, up to 50 mm (2.0 in) long and 8–12 mm (0.31–0.47 in) wide and light yellowish-brown. The seeds are elliptic, about 3 mm (0.12 in) long with a small aril.

== Taxonomy ==
Acacia chartacea was first formally described in 1992 by the botanist Bruce Maslin in the journal Nuytsia from specimens he collected 49.5 km (30.8 mi) south of the Billabong Roadhouse at Balladonia in 1976. The specific epithet (chartacea) refers to the papery pods.

== Distribution and habitat ==
This species of wattle is native to an area along the west coast of Western Australia from near Shark Bay to the Murchison River and near Cape Cuvier where it grows in sand or sandy clay on sandplains or sand dunes in tall, dense shrubland in the Carnarvon, Geraldton Sandplains and Yalgoo bioregions.

== Conservation status ==
Acacia chartacea is listed as "not threatened" by the Government of Western Australia Department of Biodiversity, Conservation and Attractions.

== See also ==
- List of Acacia species
