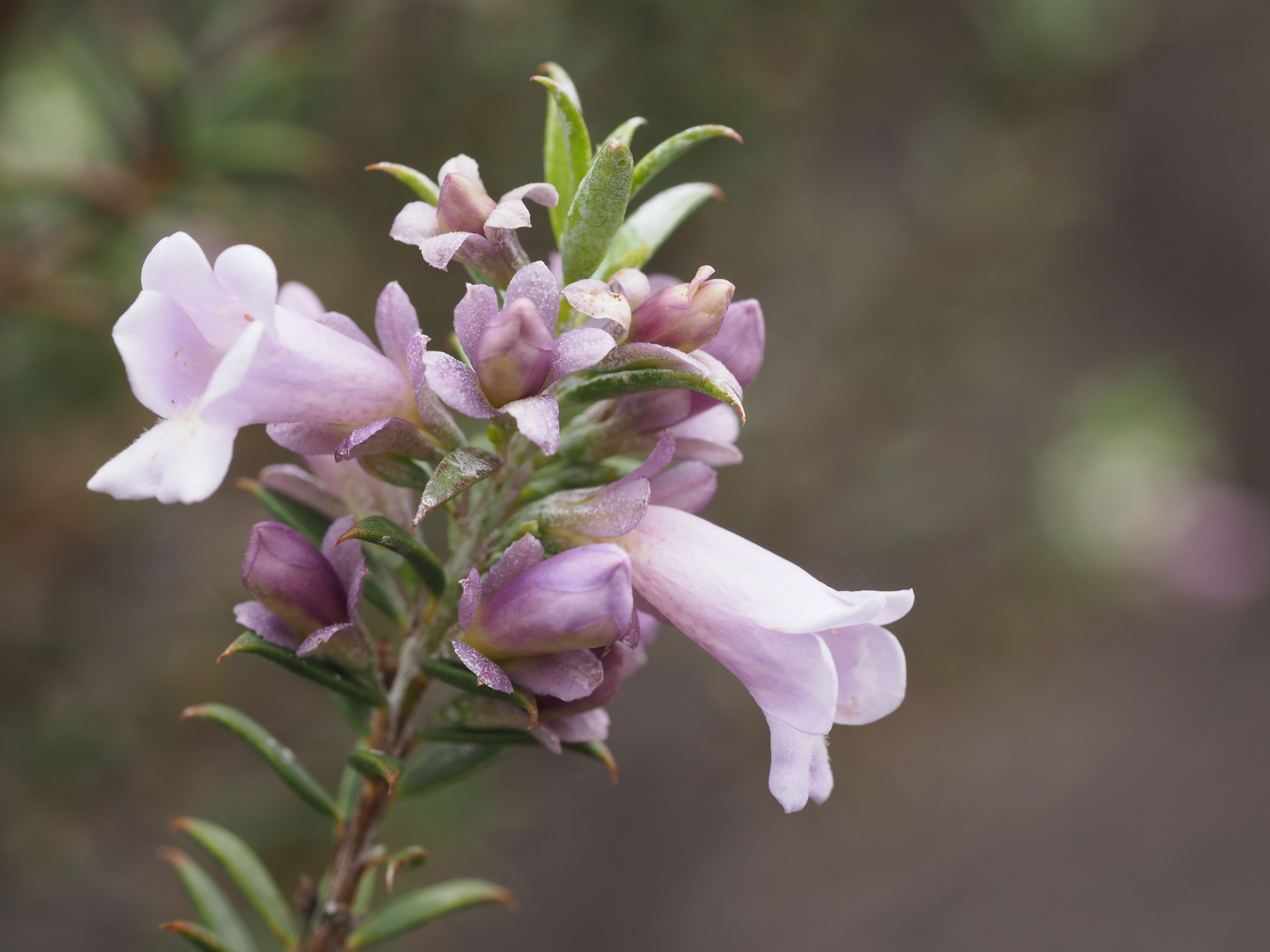
- Eremophila psilocalyx leaves and flowers

Scientific classification
- Kingdom: Plantae
- Clade: Embryophytes
- Clade: Tracheophytes
- Clade: Spermatophytes
- Clade: Angiosperms
- Clade: Eudicots
- Clade: Asterids
- Order: Lamiales
- Family: Scrophulariaceae
- Genus: Eremophila
- Species: E. psilocalyx

Binomial name
- Eremophila psilocalyx F.Muell.

Synonyms
- Eremophila pachyphylla Diels

= Eremophila psilocalyx =

Species of flowering plant

Eremophila psilocalyx is a flowering plant in the figwort family, Scrophulariaceae and is endemic to Western Australia. It is an erect shrub with a broom-like shape, narrow, hooked leaves and white, pink, blue or purple flowers. It is common in the mallee country around Esperance. It was sometimes incorrectly known as Eremophila pachyphylla.

== Description ==
Eremophila psilocalyx is an erect shrub which grows to a height of 0.8–3 m (3–10 ft) with many branches beginning at ground level. Its branches are glabrous and have raised, warty lumps, and resin secreting glands, making them sticky near their ends. The leaves are arranged alternately along the branches, narrow elliptic to lance-shaped tapering at the lower end, and with a hook at the far end. They are mostly 11–26 mm (0.4–1 in) long, 2–4 mm (0.08–0.2 in) wide, glabrous, and sticky when young.

The flowers are borne singly or in pairs in leaf axils on a glabrous, sticky stalk 3–5 mm (0.1–0.2 in) long. There are 5 overlapping, cream to purple, lance-shaped sepals which are 6–11 mm (0.2–0.4 in) long and mostly glabrous. The petals are 10–20 mm (0.4–0.8 in) long and are joined at their lower end to form a tube. The petal tube is white to lilac-coloured, sometimes pink, blue or purple, and white inside with yellow-brown spots. The petal tube and lobes are glabrous apart from the inside of the lower petal lobe and the inside of the tube which have long, soft hairs. The 4 stamens are fully enclosed in the petal tube. Flowering occurs from July to October, sometimes to December and the fruits which follow are dry, oval-shaped and 3–4 mm (0.1–0.2 in) long.

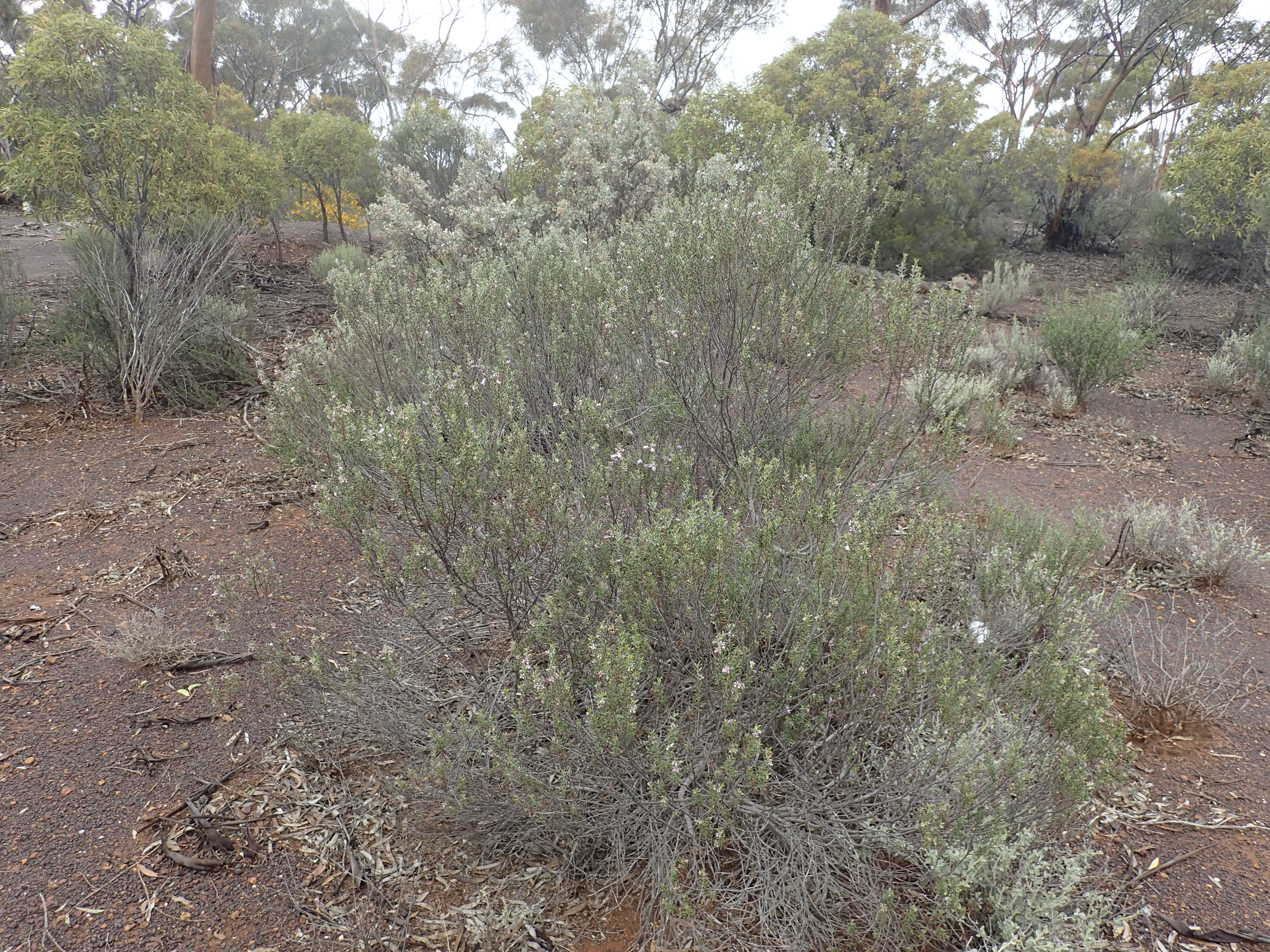
E. psilocalyx growing south of Widgiemooltha

== Taxonomy and naming ==
The species was first formally described by Ferdinand von Mueller in 1876 and the description was published in Fragmenta phytographiae Australiae. The specific epithet (psilocalyx) is derived from the Ancient Greek ψῑλός (psīlós) meaning "smooth" or "bare" and κάλυξ (kálux) meaning "cup" or "cover" referring to the glabrous sepals.

The species was named Eremophila pachyphylla by Ludwig Diels who was apparently unaware that the species had been described earlier.

== Distribution and habitat ==
Eremophila psilocalyx is a widespread and common species between Lake King and Balladonia in the Coolgardie, Esperance Plains, Mallee and Murchison biogeographic regions where it grows in a range of soils on plains, saltpans and rocky hillsides.

== Conservation ==
This species is classified as "not threatened" by the Western Australian Government Department of Parks and Wildlife.

== Use in horticulture ==
This species is not often cultivated but its prolific flowers, neat shape and the tendency of the colourful sepals to remain on the plant long after flowering make it a suitable species for wider use. It can be propagated from cuttings but may be very slow to strike, taking up to a year to develop roots. It is more easily grown by grafting onto Myoporum rootstock and will grow in most soils in a sunny or part-shaded position. It is very drought tolerant and moderately frost resistant.
