= Eucalyptus laevis =

Conservation status
- Least Concern (IUCN 3.1)

Scientific classification
- Kingdom: Plantae
- Clade: Tracheophytes
- Clade: Angiosperms
- Clade: Eudicots
- Clade: Rosids
- Order: Myrtales
- Family: Myrtaceae
- Genus: Eucalyptus
- Species: E. laevis

Binomial name
- Eucalyptus laevis L.A.S.Johnson & K.D.Hill

Species of eucalyptus

Eucalyptus laevis is a species of mallee or tree that is endemic to Western Australia. It has thin, rough, fibrous or flaky bark on the trunk, smooth bark above. Its adult leaves are linear to narrow lance-shaped, the flower buds are arranged in groups of between seven and eleven, the flowers are white and the fruit is cylindrical to barrel-shaped.

== Description ==
Eucalyptus laevis is a mallee that typically grows to a height of 3–6 m (9.8–19.7 ft) or a tree to 10 m (33 ft), and it forms a lignotuber. It has thin, rough, fibrous or flaky bark on at least part of the trunk, sometimes also the larger branches, smooth bark above. Young plants and coppice regrowth have stems that are more or less square in cross-section and leaves that are bluish grey, 65–90 mm (2.6–3.5 in) long and 9–20 mm (0.35–0.79 in) wide. Adult leaves are the same glossy green on both sides, linear to narrow lance-shaped, 65–105 mm (2.6–4.1 in) long and 5–10 mm (0.20–0.39 in) wide on a petiole 8–15 mm (0.31–0.59 in) long. The flower buds are arranged in leaf axils in groups of between seven and eleven on an unbranched peduncle 9–17 mm (0.35–0.67 in) long, the individual buds on pedicels 3–5 mm (0.12–0.20 in) long. Mature buds are oval 6–7 mm (0.24–0.28 in) long and about 4 mm (0.16 in) wide with a conical or rounded operculum. Flowering has been observed in January and the flowers are white. The fruit is a woody cylindrical to barrel-shaped capsule 5–8 mm (0.20–0.31 in) long and 4–6 mm (0.16–0.24 in) wide with the valves near rim level or below it.

== Taxonomy and naming ==
Eucalyptus laevis was first formally described in 2001 by Lawrie Johnson and Ken Hill from a specimen collected near Norseman and the description was published in the journal Nuytsia. The specific epithet (laevis) is variant of a Latin word meaning 'smooth' or 'free from unevenness', referring to the flower buds.

== Distribution and habitat ==
This eucalypt grows in woodland on heavy calcareous loams in flat country between Norseman and Balladonia.

== Conservation status ==
It is listed as a least concern species with the International Union for the Conservation of Nature and is known to have over 2,000 individual trees in the native range occupying an area of 164 km^{2} (63 sq mi) although the population is severely fragmented.

== See also ==
- List of Eucalyptus species
