= Nanambinia Station =

Pastoral lease in Western Australia

Coordinates: 32°40′09″S 123°34′59″E

Location in Western Australia

Nanambinia Station is a pastoral lease located south of Balladonia, Western Australia on the Eyre Highway in the Goldfields-Esperance region.

Henry (Heinrich) Dimer took up the lease in 1896. The property takes its name from the Indigenous Australian word for a willow-like tree that is native to the area.

A unique record of life on the station appeared in a series of letters from Nanambinia (via Israelite Bay) to "Aunt Mary" (the "Children's Corner") in the Western Australian weekly newspaper the Western Mail, by the girls of the Dimer family, Annie and Bertha.

Nanambinia occupied an area in excess of 500,000 acres (2,023 km^{2}) in 1934, and the Dimer family were running 600 head of cattle as well as merino and Shropshire sheep that produced 50 bales annually. The family had added over 50 miles (80 km) of fencing and dug 25 dams for watering the stock.

The Dimer family were long associated with the lease, breeding sheep, cattle, horses, camels and donkeys on the station.

In 1950 only 700 sheep were sheared and the property was being run by Fred Dimer.

== See also ==
- Noondoonia Station
- List of ranches and stations
- List of pastoral leases in Western Australia
