= Eucalyptus ravida =

Scientific classification
- Kingdom: Plantae
- Clade: Tracheophytes
- Clade: Angiosperms
- Clade: Eudicots
- Clade: Rosids
- Order: Myrtales
- Family: Myrtaceae
- Genus: Eucalyptus
- Species: E. ravida

Binomial name
- Eucalyptus ravida L.A.S.Johnson & K.D.Hill

Synonyms
- Eucalyptus salubris var. glauca Maiden

Species of eucalyptus

Eucalyptus ravida is a species of small mallet that is endemic to Western Australia. It has smooth, shiny bark, lance-shaped adult leaves, flower buds in groups of seven, white flowers and conical to hemispherical fruit.

== Description ==
Eucalyptus ravida is a mallet that has fluted stems and typically grows to a height of 5–20 m (16–66 ft) but does not form a lignotuber. It has smooth shiny greyish to brownish bark. Young plants and coppice regrowth have glaucous branchlets and bluish green to glaucous leaves that are 55–90 mm (2.2–3.5 in) long and 15–25 mm (0.59–0.98 in) wide and petiolate. Adult leaves are the same shade of green on both sides, glaucous at first, glossy later, 58–130 mm (2.3–5.1 in) long and 8–23 mm (0.31–0.91 in) wide, tapering to a petiole 10–25 mm (0.39–0.98 in) long. The flower buds are arranged in leaf axils in groups of seven on a flattened, unbranched peduncle 5–14 mm (0.20–0.55 in) long, the individual buds sessile or on pedicels up to 2 mm (0.079 in) long. Mature buds are oval, 8–13 mm (0.31–0.51 in) long and 5–6 mm (0.20–0.24 in) wide with a conical operculum. Flowering occurs from September to December and the flowers are creamy white. The fruit is a woody, conical to hemispherical capsule 4–7 mm (0.16–0.28 in) long and 6–10 mm (0.24–0.39 in) wide with the valve protruding strongly.

== Taxonomy and naming ==
Eucalyptus ravida was first formally described in 1991 by Lawrence Alexander Sidney Johnson and Ken Hill in the journal Telopea. The specific epithet (ravida) is from the Latin word ravidus meaning "greyish", referring to the appearance of the tree caused by the glaucous twigs.

Eucalyptus ravida is one of the six true gimlet species that have buds in groups of seven. The other true gimlets are E. campaspe, E. effusa, E. salubris, E. terebra and E. tortilis. The non-glaucous E. salubris is easily distinguished from E. ravida and E. campaspe both of which have conspicuously glaucous branchlets.

== Distribution and habitat ==
This mallet is found on undulating plains and shallow depressions between Callion, Norseman and Zanthus in the Avon Wheatbelt, Coolgardie, Mallee and Murchison biogeographic regions.

== Conservation status ==
This eucalypt is classified as "not threatened" by the Western Australian Government Department of Parks and Wildlife.

== See also ==
- List of Eucalyptus species
