= Noondoonia Station =

Pastoral lease in Western Australia

Coordinates: 32°18′37″S 123°43′25″E

Location in Western Australia

Noondoonia station is a pastoral lease located north of Balladonia, Western Australia on the Eyre Highway in the Goldfields-Esperance region. It is adjacent to Balladonia Station.

It was established in 1883 by John Cook. Cook originally selected 90,000 acres (36,422 ha) of land which later acted as the home station. Additional plots were added and the property occupied 274,000 acres (111,000 ha) in 1933.

The Cook family were long associated with the station, originally focusing on cattle and later sheep.

Life on the isolated station was not without hardships, particularly due to wild dogs.

== See also ==
- Nanambinia Station
- List of ranches and stations
- List of pastoral leases in Western Australia
