= Eucalyptus creta =

Large-fruited gimlet

Conservation status
- Priority Three — Poorly Known Taxa (DEC)

Scientific classification
- Kingdom: Plantae
- Clade: Tracheophytes
- Clade: Angiosperms
- Clade: Eudicots
- Clade: Rosids
- Order: Myrtales
- Family: Myrtaceae
- Genus: Eucalyptus
- Species: E. creta

Binomial name
- Eucalyptus creta L.A.S.Johnson & K.D.Hill

Species of eucalyptus

Eucalyptus creta, commonly known as the large-fruited gimlet, is a species of mallet or tree that is endemic to Western Australia. It has smooth, shiny bark, lance-shaped adult leaves, flower buds in groups of three in leaf axils, relatively large white to creamy yellow flowers, and broadly hemispherical to bell-shaped fruit.

== Description ==
Eucalyptus creta is a mallet or tree that typically grows to a height of 3–15 m (9.8–49.2 ft) but does not form a lignotuber. It has smooth, shiny, yellowish, greenish or brownish to copper-coloured bark. Adult leaves are narrow lance-shaped, the same glossy green on both sides, 55–132 mm (2.2–5.2 in) long and 12–35 mm (0.47–1.38 in) wide on a petiole 8–18 mm (0.31–0.71 in) long. The flower buds are arranged in groups of three in leaf axils on a peduncle 1–3 mm (0.039–0.118 in) long, the individual buds sessile. Mature buds are oval, 15–22 mm (0.59–0.87 in) long and 14–20 mm (0.55–0.79 in) wide with a wing on two sides of the floral cup and a beaked operculum. Flowering occurs in May and the flowers are white to creamy yellow. The fruit is a woody, hemispherical to shallow cup-shaped capsule with two wings along the sides and the valves at the same level as the rim or extended beyond it.

== Taxonomy and naming ==
Eucalyptus creta was first formally described in 1991 by Lawrie Johnson and Ken Hill from a specimen collected north of Mount Ney, north-east of Esperance. The specific epithet (creta) is a Latin word meaning "grow" or "increase", "referring to the buds, flowers and fruit".

== Distribution and habitat ==
Large-fruited gimlet is locally common in a restricted area north-east of Esperance in the Esperance Plains and Mallee biogeographic regions, where it grows on calcareous plains in sandy loam or clay with little understorey vegetation.

== Conservation status ==
This eucalypt is classified as "Priority Three" by the Government of Western Australia Department of Parks and Wildlife meaning that it is poorly known and known from only a few locations but is not under imminent threat.

== See also ==
- List of Eucalyptus species
