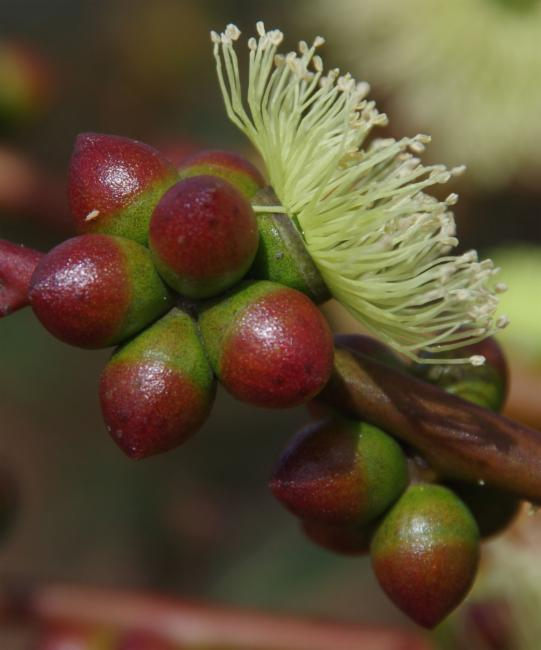
- Flower buds and a flower of Eucalyptus terebra near Balladonia

Scientific classification
- Kingdom: Plantae
- Clade: Tracheophytes
- Clade: Angiosperms
- Clade: Eudicots
- Clade: Rosids
- Order: Myrtales
- Family: Myrtaceae
- Genus: Eucalyptus
- Species: E. terebra

Binomial name
- Eucalyptus terebra L.A.S.Johnson & K.D.Hill

= Eucalyptus terebra =

Balladonia gimlet

Species of eucalyptus

Eucalyptus terebra, commonly known as Balladonia gimlet, is a species of gimlet that is endemic to Western Australia. It has satiny or glossy bark on its fluted trunk, linear to narrow lance-shaped adult leaves, flower buds in groups of seven, yellowish flowers and conical to hemispherical fruit. It is one of the seven species of gimlet.

== Description ==
Eucalyptus terebra is a mallet that typically grows to a height of 2.5–12 m (8 ft 2 in – 39 ft 4 in) but does not form a lignotuber. It has smooth satiny or glossy, dark grey to orange, green-brown bark on its fluted trunk. The adult leaves are glossy green, linear to lance-shaped, 60–95 mm (2.4–3.7 in) long and 5–12 mm (0.20–0.47 in) wide, tapering to a petiole 5–13 mm (0.20–0.51 in) long. The flower buds are arranged in leaf axils in groups of seven on an unbranched peduncle 1–4 mm (0.039–0.157 in) long, the individual buds sessile or on pedicels up to 2 mm (0.079 in) long. Mature buds are oval to spherical, 6–10 mm (0.24–0.39 in) long and 6–8 mm (0.24–0.31 in) wide with a rounded operculum with a pointed tip. Flowering occurs in November and the flowers are lemon yellow. The fruit is a sessile, woody conical to hemispherical capsule 3–6 mm (0.12–0.24 in) long and 9–13 mm (0.35–0.51 in) wide with the four valves protruding above the rim. The seeds are oval, pale to light brown and 1–2 mm (0.039–0.079 in) long.

== Taxonomy and naming ==
Eucalyptus terebra was first formmaly described in 1991 by Lawrie Johnson and Ken Hill in the journal Telopea from specimens they collected near Balladonia in 1983. The specific epithet (terebra) is a Latin word for the woodworking tool called a gimlet.

== Distribution and habitat ==
Balladonia gimlet grows in flat areas in the southern part of the Goldfields-Esperance region in calcerous loam or sandy soils. It is found between Balladonia and Norseman in the Coolgardie, Nullarbor and Mallee biogeographic regions.

== Conservation status ==
This eucalypt is classified as "not threatened" by the Western Australian Government Department of Parks and Wildlife.

== See also ==
- List of Eucalyptus species
