= Balladonia, Western Australia =

Roadhouse community in Western Australia

Balladonia
- Town
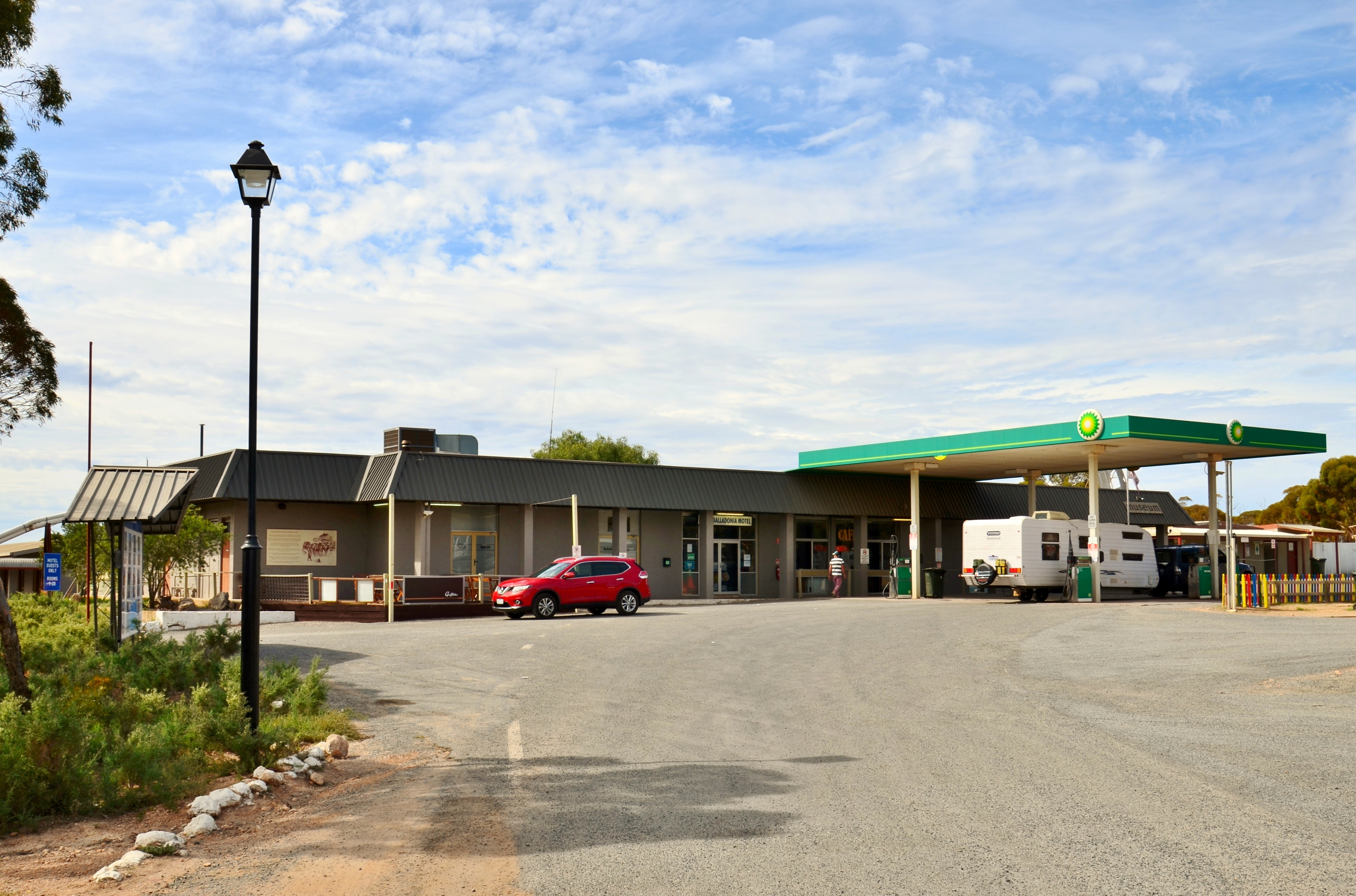
- Balladonia Roadhouse, 2017

- Interactive map of Balladonia
- Coordinates: 32°27′29″S 123°51′58″E
- Country: Australia
- State: Western Australia
- LGA: Shire of Dundas
- Location: 916 km (569 mi) from Perth; 192 km (119 mi) from Norseman; 518 km (322 mi) from Eucla; 530 km (330 mi) from Border Village
- Established: 1879

Government
  - State electorate: Eyre
  - Federal division: O'Connor

Area
  - Total: 15,267.6 km^{2} (5,894.9 sq mi)
- Elevation: 185 m (607 ft)

Population
  - Total: 0 (SAL 2021)
- Postcode: 6443

Balladonia is a small roadhouse community located on the Eyre Highway in Western Australia. It is the first stop east of Norseman on the journey east across the Nullarbor Plain. Between Balladonia and Caiguna is a 146.6-kilometre (91.1 mi) stretch of the highway which is one of the longest straight stretches of road in the world.

== History ==
The name is an Aboriginal word meaning "big rock by itself".

The area was settled by Europeans in 1879, and the original Balladonia homestead was built 28 kilometres (17 mi) away from the present townsite. From 1897 to 1929, Balladonia was a telegraph station on the East-West Telegraph, a telegraph line running from Perth to Adelaide telegraph line, due to a previous coastal line being shorted by salt spray from the Southern Ocean.

The arid climate and lack of suitable water sources restricted the town's development.

In July 1979, the area gained worldwide attention when the re-entry of the Skylab space station left a trail of debris across the nearby countryside.

== Balladonia Station / Balladonia Aggregation ==
Balladonia Station is a pastoral lease, originally run as a sheep station, adjacent to Noondoonia Station to the north, and Nanambinia Station to the south of the Eyre Highway.

The station was visited and written about in a newspaper in 1924, and the reflections on the conditions at that time included concern about rabbits. By the 1930s, the homestead of the station was notable for its substantial size and architecture. An earlier photograph in the 1890s reveals the stone walls in the vicinity of the homestead, and a possible earlier stage of the homestead building.

During most of the twentieth century the station was a popular stopping place on the Eyre Highway.

In 2012, the property was converted into a cattle station, and the old shearing shed was no longer used for its original purpose.

In September 2019 the 671,277-hectare (1,658,760-acre) pastoral lease known as the Balladonia Aggregation, comprising four stations – Balladonia, Nanambinia, Woorlba, and Noondoonia – was sold. It had been advertised for A$8,500,000, including all stock, comprising 5,300 head of cattle.

In September 2021, the station was operated by John Croker.

== Facilities and attractions ==
The Balladonia roadhouse, located on the Eyre Highway, is known as Balladonia Hotel Motel, and includes a caravan park. Its Balladonia Museum has a display of Skylab debris and newspaper clippings, as well as information and artefacts relating to Aboriginal heritage; European exploration and settlement; the history of the Royal Flying Doctor Service; the construction of the Eyre Highway; and local flora and fauna.

Access via four-wheel drive is possible to the start of the cliffs, believed to be the longest in the world, of the Great Australian Bight from Balladonia.

There is the ruined shell of the telegraph station just to the east of Balladonia at the start of the "Ninety Mile Straight". However, it is signposted as being private property.

=== Afghan Rock ===
Also in the area, on the Balladonia–Rawlinna Road, are freshwater pools 14 km (8.7 mi) east at Afghan Rock(s), named for an cameleer who was shot nearby on 13 October 1894.

The pools were a vital stop for drinking water during the 19th century, when goods were being transported across the Nullarbor by teams of horses or camels, especially during the days of the Western Australian gold rushes. On this date, there were two groups of men and their beasts: white men, using horses, and "Afghan" cameleers. Tom Knowles, after noticing one of the "Afghan" cameleers, Noor(e) Mahomet, washing his feet in one of the rock holes (known as gnamma in WA). After being met with a refusal to desist, Knowles knocked Mahomet down and drew his gun. Mahomet's friends came to his aid, throwing stones and waving sticks. Knowles shot one of the other men dead and wounded Mahomet, who died later of his wounds. After running out of ammunition, he ran away, but the cameleers caught him, tied him to a tree, and beat him until he lost consciousness. His companions came to the Afghan camp, where they were tied up against trees for the night. In the morning, the cameleers untied the men, whereupon Knowles rode to Israelite Bay (then referred to as Point Malcolm), 120 mi (190 km) away, and report the incident to police.

The case was extensively reported in the newspapers at the time, which also followed the trial of Knowles, on charges of manslaughter. Knowles was acquitted, but the decision was controversial and Knowles fled to the Northern Territory. The case is described in detail in The Ballad of Abdul Wade (2022), a book about cameleer Abdul Wade, by Ryan Butta.

Today, Afghan Rock is accessible by soft roaders, but travelers need to obtain permission and directions from the manager of Balladonia Station. It is approximately 447 m (1,467 ft) above sea level.

== Climate ==
Balladonia experiences a semi-arid climate (Köppen climate classification BSk).

Climate data for Balladonia
Month	Jan	Feb	Mar	Apr	May	Jun	Jul	Aug	Sep	Oct	Nov	Dec	Year
Mean daily maximum °C (°F)	31.3 (88.3)	30.6 (87.1)	28.1 (82.6)	24.9 (76.8)	20.9 (69.6)	18.0 (64.4)	17.6 (63.7)	19.2 (66.6)	22.3 (72.1)	25.0 (77.0)	27.8 (82.0)	30.2 (86.4)	24.7 (76.5)
Mean daily minimum °C (°F)	14.6 (58.3)	14.8 (58.6)	13.5 (56.3)	10.9 (51.6)	8.0 (46.4)	5.8 (42.4)	4.8 (40.6)	5.3 (41.5)	6.8 (44.2)	8.8 (47.8)	11.3 (52.3)	13.2 (55.8)	9.8 (49.6)
Average rainfall mm (inches)	18.6 (0.73)	19.4 (0.76)	27.1 (1.07)	20.0 (0.79)	26.9 (1.06)	26.0 (1.02)	20.3 (0.80)	21.4 (0.84)	20.2 (0.80)	22.6 (0.89)	21.9 (0.86)	18.5 (0.73)	262.9 (10.35)
Average rainy days (≥ 1.0 mm)	1.9	2.0	2.8	2.7	3.4	4.0	4.0	3.7	2.8	2.6	2.5	2.0	34.4
Source: Australian Bureau of Meteorology
