= Gunbarrel Highway =

Track in Australia

Gunbarrel Highway Northern Territory–Western Australia
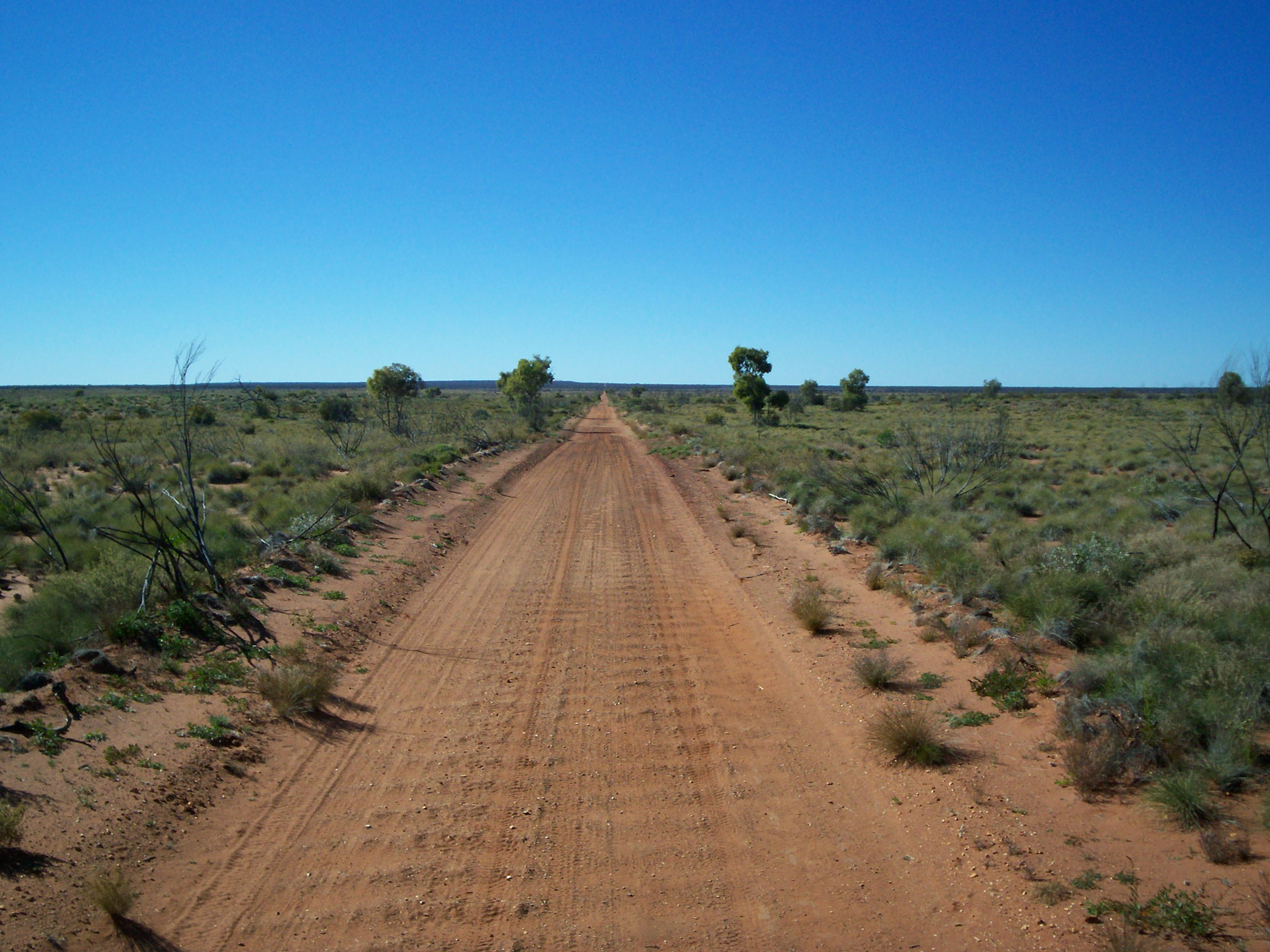
- The highway is "as straight as a gun barrel" in some places
- Coordinates: 25.796345°S 122.953248°E (West end); 25.982280°S 132.980838°E (East end)

General information
- Type: Track
- Length: 1,347 km (837 mi)

Major junctions
- West end: Carnegie Road; Carnegie Homestead, Western Australia
- Great Central Road; Gary Highway
- East end: Mulga Park Road; Victory Downs Homestead, Northern Territory

Location(s)
- Region: Goldfields-Esperance (WA), Far North (SA) Central Australia (NT)

Restrictions
- Permits: 4 required
- Fuel supply: Carnegie Homestead 25.795831°S 122.975319°E; Warburton (26.131861°S 126.569026°E; Warakurna Roadhouse 25.042906°S 128.303417°E

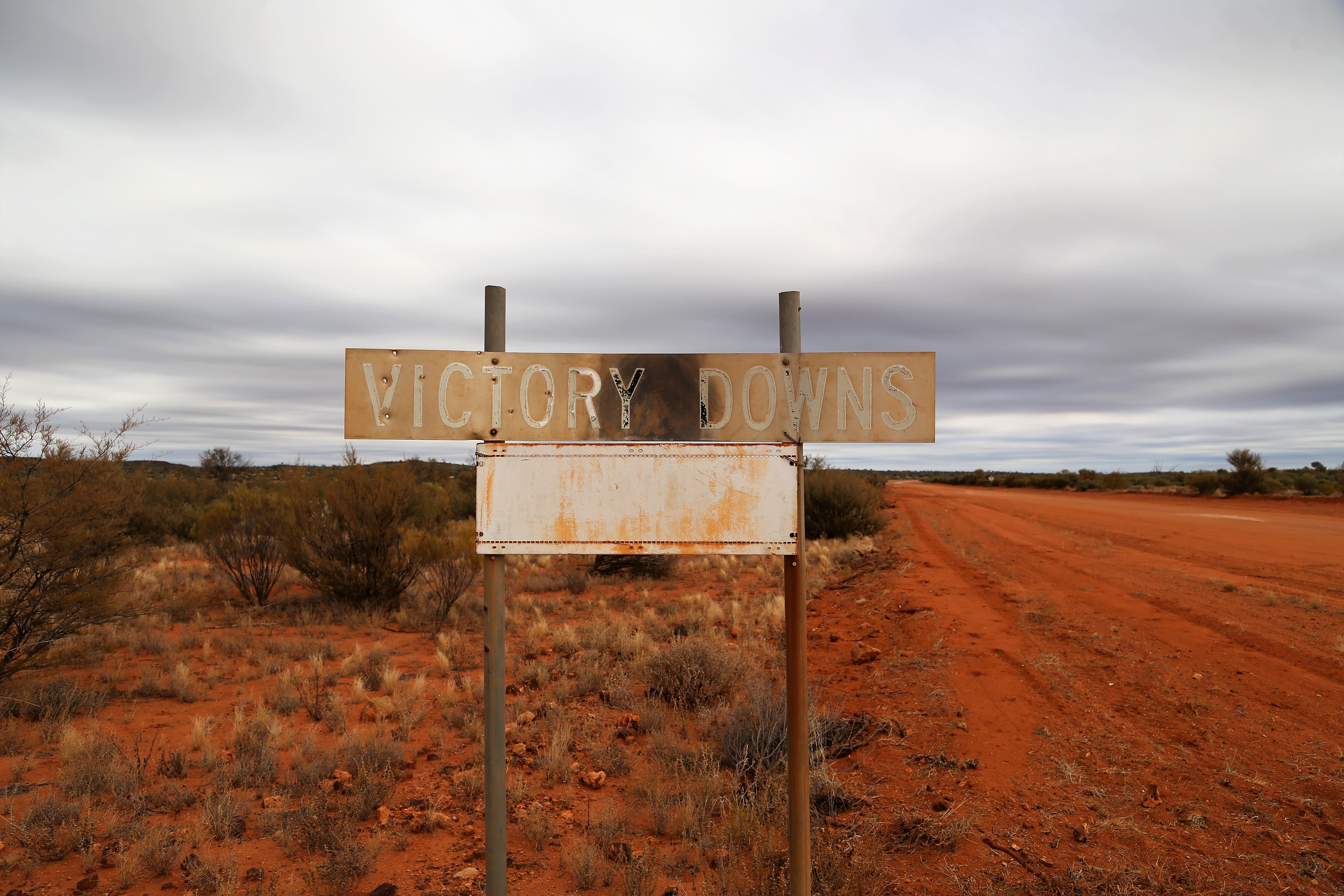
A sign marking the boundary of Victory Downs, the beginning of the original Gunbarrel Highway. This section is now known as Mulga Park Road.

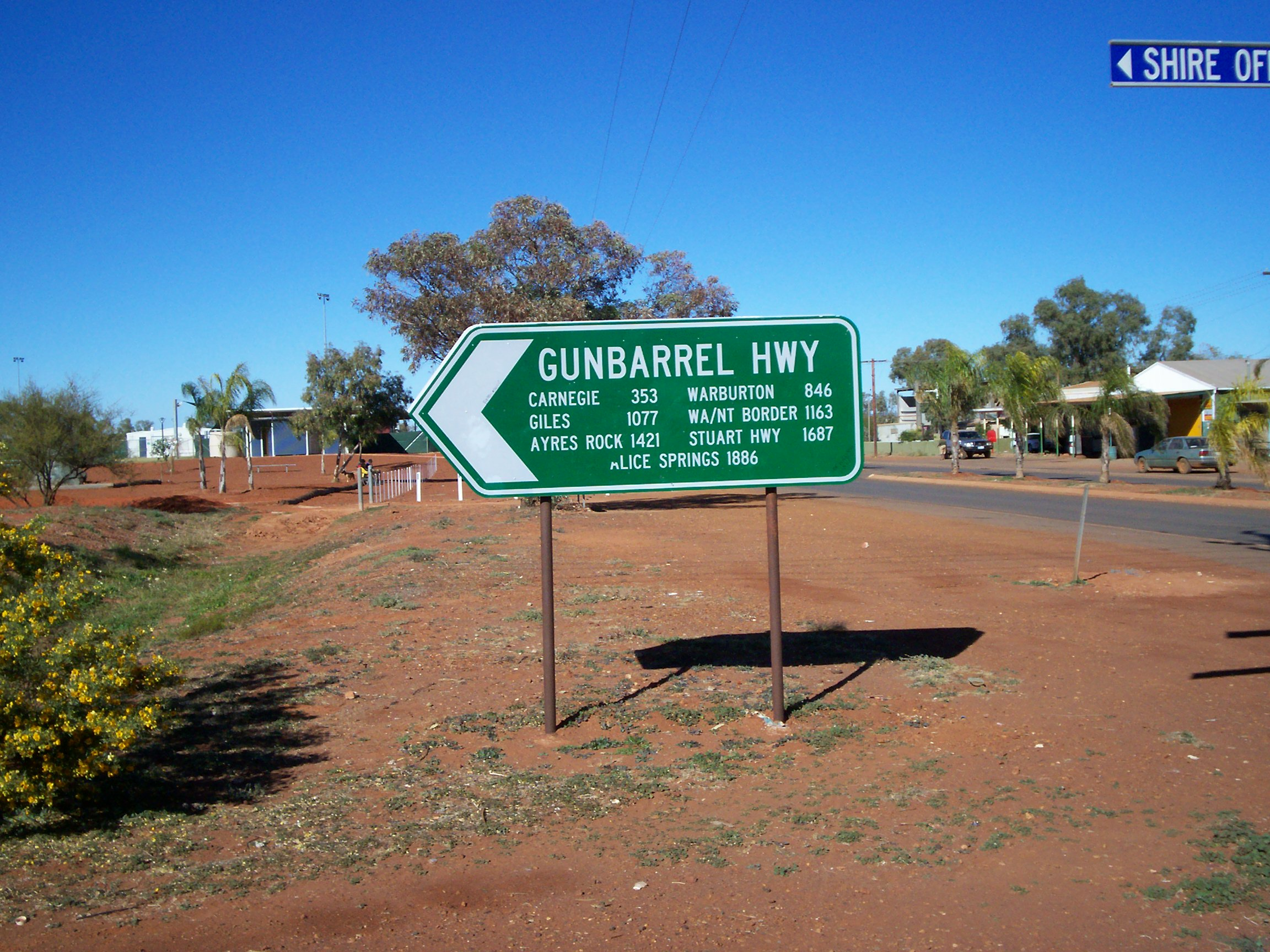
A sign at Wiluna, Western Australia.

The Gunbarrel Highway is an isolated desert track in the Northern Territory, South Australia and Western Australia. It consists of about 1,350 km (840 mi) of washaways, heavy corrugations, stone, sand and flood plains. The Gunbarrel Highway connects Victory Downs in the Northern Territory to Carnegie Station in Western Australia. Some sources incorrectly show the highway extending west to Wiluna.

The road was built as part of Australia's role in the weapons research establishment called Woomera which included Emu Field and Maralinga, both atomic bomb testing sites. The name comes from Len Beadell's Gunbarrel Road Construction Party, so named as his intention was to build roads as straight as a gunbarrel. The highway was protested by the Australian group Midnight Oil in their song of the same name as the highway.

== History ==
There were three main reasons for the construction of the Gunbarrel Highway. The first was to provide access for a future meteorological station which was needed to forecast upper winds prior to the testing of atomic weapons in South Australia. The second was for instrumentation along the centre-line of fire for rockets launched from Woomera. The third was to allow surveyors from the Australian Division of National Mapping to continue the geodetic survey of little known areas of outback Australia. A consequence of the construction was the completion of the first east-west road link across the centre of Australia.

=== First stage ===
The road was built in four stages beginning in 1955. In early November, the Gunbarrel Road Construction Party (GRCP) assembled near Coober Pedy in South Australia, half coming from Adelaide together with a bulldozer, and half with a grader from Maralinga, led by Len Beadell. The starting point was Victory Downs homestead just north of the border with the Northern Territory, and 24 km (15 mi) west of the Stuart Highway.

Work began on 13 November 1955, and continued westward to Mulga Park. An interruption occurred after about 35 km (22 mi) when the grader's blade mounting bolts were snapped after hitting a submerged Mulga tree root. Beadell made a hurried return trip to Alice Springs for parts. The road reached Mulga Park on 2 December, where construction ceased for the year, as the bulldozer's starting pilot motor had failed.

Beadell continued ahead on a ground reconnaissance, then on 7 December made an aerial survey which departed from a natural airstrip in the Mount Davies vicinity, and flew towards the Rawlinson Ranges where the future weather station was to be located. With the knowledge gained, Beadell led a ground party of four Land Rovers to the site where a stone cairn was built on 12 December. The site was named Giles after Ernest Giles, the first European to explore the area in 1874. Beadell's Land Rover suffered a broken rear axle during the return towards Mount Davies, so an axle was borrowed from one of the other vehicles which was left behind to be recovered the following year.

=== Second stage ===
In February 1956, the second stage continued from Mulga Park to the Musgrave Ranges, then in March via the Mann Ranges and Tomkinson Ranges to Giles where the party arrived on 29 March. Beadell had hoped to take the road via Surveyor Generals Corner, but it was too rocky for road building. The first priority in establishing the weather station was to find water.

A boring plant was obtained from the nearest railhead 800 km (500 mi) to the east. It was slowly towed to Giles by the grader, and on the fourth drilling attempt, suitable drinking water was discovered. Work on the Giles establishment continued throughout April and May, which included laying out the airstrip. In June Beadell and the GRCP were called away to begin work on the Mount Davies road.

In 1957, no further work took place on the Gunbarrel Highway. Beadell continued work at Giles during the early months.

=== Third stage ===
The third stage of the highway began with a solo reconnaissance by Beadell from Giles to Warburton on 12 March 1958, when the weather was still very hot. In his book Too Long in the Bush, Beadell described the forbidding conditions in a chapter which he called "An Unshared Nightmare". Daytime temperatures were between 40 and 45 °C (104 and 113 °F), which resulted in an overheating engine and fuel vaporisation. The extreme heat melted plastic parts of his instrument panel and radio transmitter, and loosened nails in his boots which caused the heels to fall off.

He lost his appetite and drank hot water only. His course took him along the southern edge of the Rawlinson Range towards Lake Christopher, then southwards through the eastern edge of the Gibson Desert. After battling through a series of jumbled sand ridges, and having three flat tyres, he found that his water supply was almost exhausted. When clear of the ridges, some rocky hills led to his discovery of a small pool of water in a creek run-off, which saved his life. He arrived at Warburton and rested for three days prior to the return journey to Giles via a different route.

After a delay caused by rain, building of the next section started on 22 March from Giles, keeping to the north and west of his earlier reconnaissance route, avoiding known obstacles. The road passed close by the position where it was estimated that Alfred Gibson had perished, then turned south towards Warburton, which was reached by early May. While at Warburton, Beadell and his team built a new airstrip much closer to the mission settlement.

=== Fourth stage ===
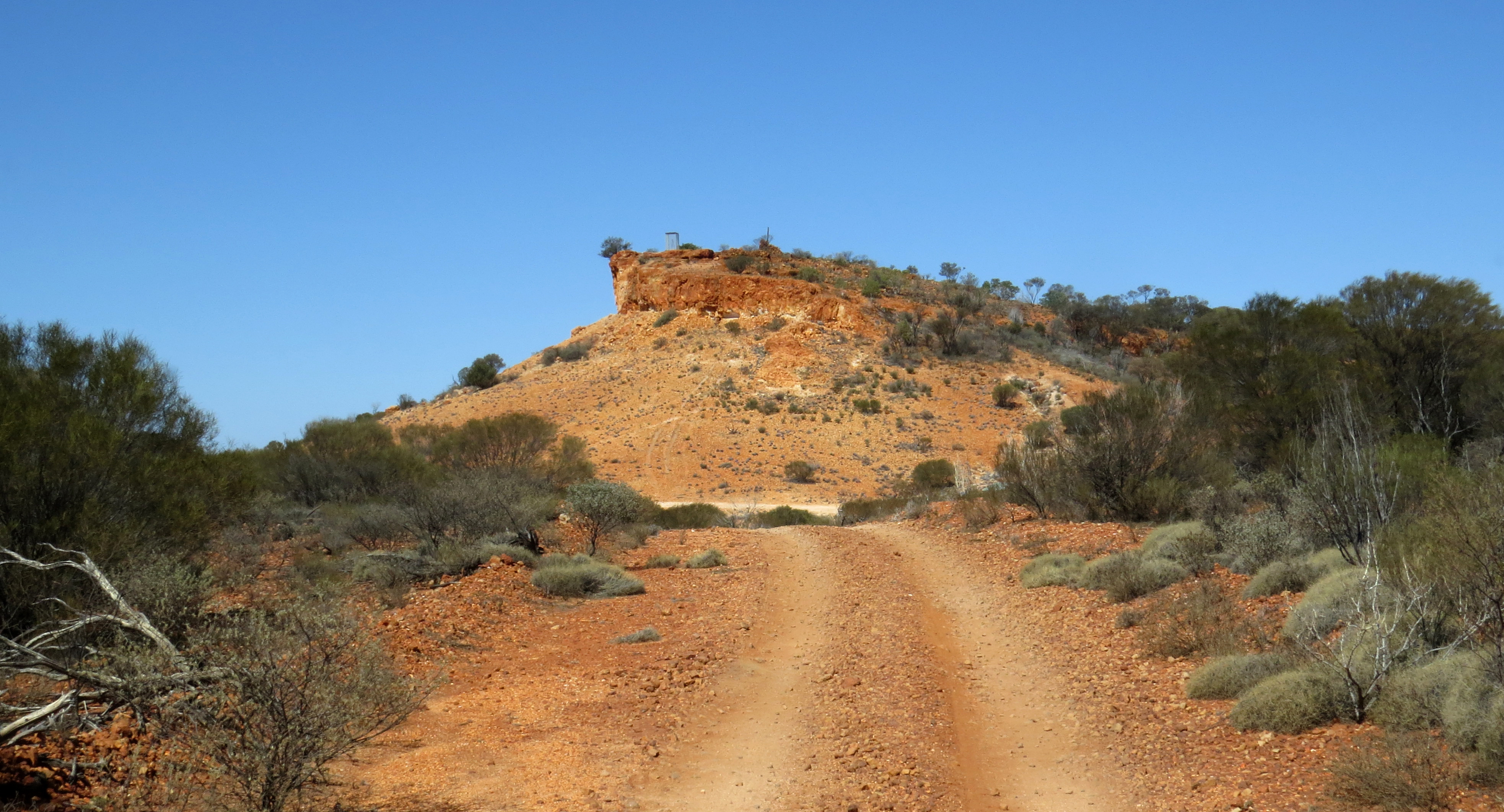
Mt. Beadell on the Gunbarrel Highway

Building of the fourth stage did not commence until an altered arrangement for the survey took place. On this occasion, the survey reconnaissance from near Warburton to Carnegie was led by H A (Bill) Johnson from the Senior Geodetic Surveyor Division of National Mapping, who was responsible for the planning and conduct of the Australian Geodetic Survey in that area. Johnson and Beadell both served in the Australian Survey Corps in the Second World War.

Johnson and Beadell each had a Land Rover in the advance party, and they were followed by two other Land Rovers and a supply truck. The second group included an officer from headquarters in Woomera, and an aboriginal affairs officer. Meanwhile, most of the GRCP returned to Giles, leaving the heavy equipment at a future turn-off (Jackie Junction) 69 km (43 mi) north of Warburton. The survey from the turn-off west towards Carnegie Station took place from 14 to 28 May during which a mountain was found. It was named Mount Beadell in honour of Beadell.

Construction of the final section began at Jackie Junction on 3 September, was abeam Mount Beadell on the 25 September, Everard Junction (with the Gary Highway) around 15 October, and reached Carnegie Station on 15 November 1958, just over three years from when the Gunbarrel Highway was begun. The length of new road built from Victory Downs was 1,347 km (837 mi).

== Conditions ==
The route is a long and tough haul through very remote territory. Its isolation requires travellers to be totally self-sufficient with water, food and fuel. The longest distance between fuel outlets is 489 km (304 mi), between Warburton and Carnegie Station. Part of the road between Jackie Junction and Warakurna, near Giles, is now known as the Old Gunbarrel Highway, and is no longer maintained due to the construction of the more direct route, the Great Central Road.

The route passes directly into Aboriginal land. It is a legal requirement for travellers to hold a valid transit permit at the time of travel. Three free permits are required in Western Australia and a permit is required to enter the APY Lands in South Australia.

Permits for the abandoned section from Warakurna and Warburton require at least two vehicles and either a HF radio or satellite telephone and requires a minimum of five working days turnaround. Entry to the abandoned section is only permitted at Warakurna or Warburton. Access to the abandoned section via Jackie Junction is not permitted. Jackie Junction Road is on sacred land and not open to the public.

== Map ==
The Gunbarrel Highway, as originally constructed, is shown in black.

== Major intersections ==
State/Territory	LGA	Location	km	mi	Destinations	Notes
Western Australia	Wiluna	Carnegie Homestead	0	0.0	Wiluna–Carnegie Road (west) – Wiluna, Lake Carnegie; Penti Downs–Carnegie Road (south) – Prenti Downs	Western terminus of highway
Western Australia	Wiluna	Mangkili Claypan Nature Reserve	153	95	Eagle Highway (north) – Warri and Yatungka Hills; David Carnegie Road (south) – Tjukayirla Roadhouse	
Western Australia	Wiluna	Geraldton Bore	208	129	Hunt Oil Road – Hunt Oil drilling camp	
Western Australia	Ngaanyatjarraku	Everard Junction	240	150	Gary Highway – Gary Junction	
Western Australia	Ngaanyatjarraku	Mount Samuel	402	250	Heather Highway – Warburton	Road not open to public (sacred land): through traffic via Warburton
Western Australia	Ngaanyatjarraku	Jackie Junction	449	279	Warburton North Road – Warburton	Road not open to public (sacred land): through traffic via Warburton
Western Australia	Ngaanyatjarraku	Warakurna/Giles	710	440	Great Central Road (Outback Highway) (west) – Laverton, Warburton	Concurrency with Great Central Road (Outback Highway)
Western Australia	Ngaanyatjarraku	Warakurna/Giles	749	465	Great Central Road (Outback Highway) (east) – Kaltukatjara, Yulara, Erldunda	Concurrency with Great Central Road (Outback Highway)
Western Australia	Ngaanyatjarraku	Wingellina	855	531	Blackstone–Warburton Road – Warburton, Blackstone	
State border			884	549	Western Australia – South Australia state border	
South Australia	APY Lands	Pipalyatjara	908	564	Mount Davies Road – Anne's Corner	
South Australia	APY Lands	Nyapari	1,092	679	Kintore Avenue – Anne's Corner	
State border			1,154	717	South Australia – Northern Territory state border	
Northern Territory	MacDonnell Region	Mulga Park	1,173	729	Mulga Park Road (west) – Mount Conner	
Northern Territory	MacDonnell Region	Victory Downs	1,347	837	Mulga Park Road (east), to Stuart Highway – Alice Springs, Darwin, Coober Pedy, Port Augusta	Eastern terminus of highway
1.000 mi = 1.609 km; 1.000 km = 0.621 mi: Closed/former; Concurrency terminus; Route transition

== See also ==
- Highways in Australia
- List of highways in the Northern Territory
- List of highways in South Australia
- List of highways in Western Australia
