= Outback Highway =

Series of roads and dirt tracks across Australia

Outback Highway Western Australia–Queensland
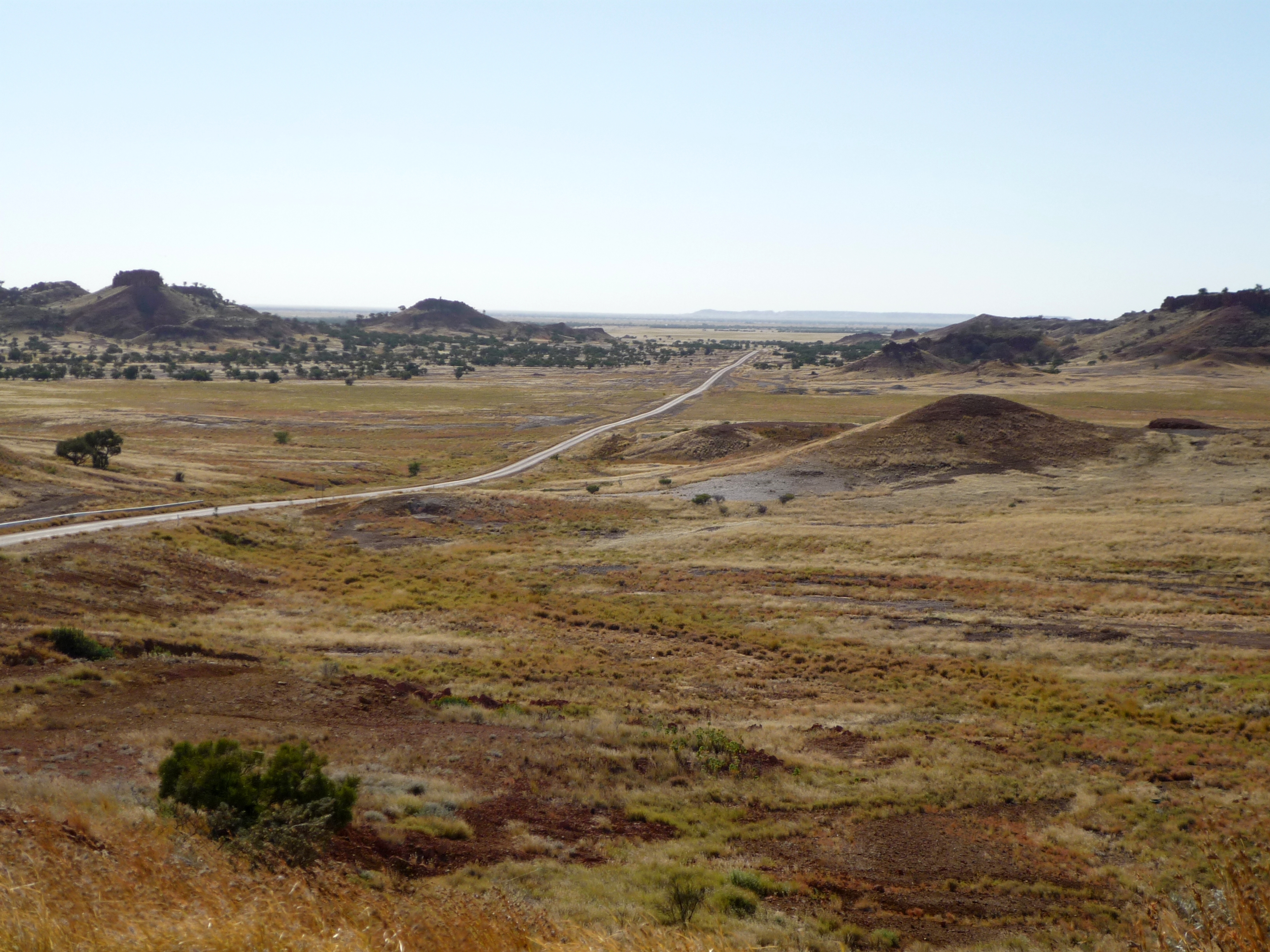
- The Kennedy Development Road between Middleton and Boulia, 2011
- Coordinates: 28.625671°S 122.401344°E (West end); 22.390557°S 143.041199°E (East end)

General information
- Type: Highway
- Length: 2,719 km (1,690 mi)

Major junctions
- West end: Laverton Leonora Road; Laverton, Western Australia
- Gunbarrel Highway; Stuart Highway; Diamantina Developmental Road
- East end: Landsborough Highway; Winton, Queensland

Location(s)
- Region: Goldfields–Esperance; Central Australia; Central West Queensland
- Major settlements: Warburton, Yulara, Alice Springs, Boulia

Restrictions
- Fuel supply: Laverton 28.624120°S 122.396416°E; Tjukayirla Roadhouse 27.155334°S 124.574817°E; Warburton (26.131861°S 126.569026°E; Warakurna Roadhouse 25.042906°S 128.303417°E; Kaltukatjara 24.873483°S 129.083220°E; Atitjere 22.984045°S 134.935457°E; Tobermorey Roadhouse 22.274469°S 137.973721°E

Highway system
- Highways in Australia; National Highway • Freeways in Australia; Highways in Western Australia; Highways in Queensland

The Outback Highway (also called Outback Way) is a series of sealed and unsealed roads linking Laverton, Western Australia and Winton, Queensland. At 2,719 kilometres (1,690 mi), it crosses Central Australia (the heart of what is colloquially known as the Outback), passing through Western Australia, the Northern Territory and Queensland. The Outback Way is often dubbed Australia's longest shortcut because it provides a short east–west route across central Australia.

== Proposed upgrade to a sealed highway ==
The Outback Highway Development Council is a non-profit alliance of local governments formed in 1998 to lobby for the sealing and upgrading of the Outback Highway (OH). It has proposed that the OH be developed to provide an inland route between southern Western Australia and northern Queensland as an alternative to the National Highway 1 along either coast.

== Sections of the Outback Highway ==
The existing roads that make up the highway are:

- Great Central Road, a 1,056-kilometre-long (656 mi) mostly graded gravel road, with short sealed sections, between Laverton and the junction with Kata Tjuta Road near Yulara. Parts of this road around Warakurna are concurrent with the Gunbarrel Highway
- Kata Tjuta Road and Uluru Road in Uluru-Kata Tjuta National Park stretching for 48 kilometres (30 mi) between Great Central Road and Lasseter Highway. The OH route passes through the park entry gate where Uluru Road divides into a lane to enter (westbound on the OH), controlled by a barrier and Park Pass payment office, and a separate exit lane (eastbound on the OH) with no barrier or stop sign. OH travellers should check with the National Parks office if a pass is required in either direction.
- Lasseter Highway, a sealed 244-kilometre-long (152 mi) road between Yulara and Erldunda on the Stuart Highway
- Stuart Highway, the section between Erldunda and the Plenty Highway junction (268 kilometres or 167 miles), of the sealed road forming the major north-south route through Central Australia.
- Plenty Highway, a mostly unsealed highway between the Stuart Highway and Donohue Highway (498 kilometres or 309 miles).
- Donohue Highway, a mostly unsealed highway between the Plenty Highway and the Diamantina Developmental Road just north of Boulia (249 kilometres or 155 miles).
- Diamantina Developmental Road (also known as the Boulia-Mt Isa Highway) between the Donohue Highway junction and Boulia (7 kilometres or 4.3 miles).
- Kennedy Development Road, a sealed highway, section from Boulia to Winton (362 kilometres or 225 miles).

The Outback Highway project is in effect a series of coordinated but separately-funded projects of Western Australia, Northern Territory and Queensland. The largest is the Western Australian project between Laverton and the Northern Territory border with road sealing due to be completed in 2032 at a cost of A$678 million.

Mobile phone coverage is limited and is non-existent for long sections of the highway. A reliable 4G service is only found in major hubs and near some roadhouses and Aboriginal communities.

As of May 2026, there are a total of 1,161 kilometres (721 mi) of the Outback Highway left to seal.

== Permits to travel on the highway through Aboriginal Lands ==
As of May 2026, the following permits are required to travel the Great Central Road:

- Great Central Road Laverton to Tjukayirla Roadhouse: apply to the Department of Planning, Lands and Heritage of the Government of Western Australia. The application is referred to the Yilka Talintji Aboriginal Corporation. (Note: In May 2026, apply online.)
- Great Central Road Tjukayirla Roadhouse to border with Northern Territory (Note: Apply via Ngaanyatjarra Council permit portal.)
- Tjukururu Road (the Great Central Road in the Northern Territory between the border with Western Australia and Kata Tjuta Road) (Note: Apply to Central Land Council.)

When keeping to the highway itself, permits are not required for travel on other sections of the Outback Highway. Queensland no longer requires permits for the sections in that state.

Further information including fuel availability, tourist information and links for road condition updates are available.

== Major intersections ==
State/Territory	LGA	Location	km	mi	Destinations	Notes
Western Australia	Laverton	Laverton	0	0.0	Laverton–Leonora Road – Leonora	Western terminus of highway Continues east as Great Central Road
Western Australia	Laverton	Warburton	554	344	Connie Sue Highway – Rawlinna	
Western Australia	Ngaanyatjarraku	Warakurna/Giles	781	485	Old Gunbarrel Highway – Carnegie	Concurrency with Gunbarrel Highway
Western Australia	Ngaanyatjarraku	Warakurna/Giles	807	501	Gunbarrel Highway – Pipalyatjara	Concurrency with Gunbarrel Highway
Western Australia – Northern Territory border			870	540	Western Australia – Northern Territory border	Continues east as Great Central Road; Continues west as Tjukaruru Road
Northern Territory	MacDonnell Region	Kaltukatjara	878	546	Lungkata Road – Kaltukatjara	
Northern Territory	unincorporated area	Yulara	1,107	688	Yulara Drive – Yulara	Continues east as Tjukaruru Road; Continues east as Lasseter Highway
Northern Territory	MacDonnell Region	Erldunda	1,351	839	Stuart Highway (A87 south) – Coober Pedy, Port Augusta, Adelaide	Continues west as Lasseter Highway; Continues north as Stuart Highway
Northern Territory	Alice Springs	Alice Springs	1,546	961	Ross Highway (B8) – Arltunga Historical Reserve	
Northern Territory	Alice Springs	Alice Springs	1,550	960	Larapinta Drive (B6) – Hermannsburg, Mereenie	
Northern Territory	MacDonnell Region	Burt Plain	1,570	980	Tanami Road (C5) – Tanami	
Northern Territory	MacDonnell Region	Burt Plain	1,620	1,010	Stuart Highway (A87 north) – Tennant Creek, Katherine, Darwin	Continues south as Stuart Highway; Continues north as Plenty Highway
Northern Territory – Queensland border			2,116	1,315	Northern Territory – Queensland border	Continues west as Plenty Highway; Continues east as Donohue Highway
Queensland	Boulia	Boulia	2,363	1,468	Diamantina Developmental Road (National Route 83) – Mount Isa, Bedourie, Birdsville	Continues west as Donohue Highway; Continues east as Kennedy Developmental Road
Queensland	Winton	Winton	2,719	1,690	Landsborough Highway (A2) – Cloncurry, Longreach	Eastern terminus of highway Continues west as Kennedy Developmental Road
1.000 mi = 1.609 km; 1.000 km = 0.621 mi: Concurrency terminus; Route transition

== Gallery ==
Turn off sign from the Diamantina Developmental Road to the Donohue Highway (Outback Way)

Turn off sign from the Diamantina Developmental Road to the Kennedy Developmental Road (Outback Way).

Turn off sign from the Diamantina Developmental Road to the Kennedy Developmental Road (Outback Way).

William John Wills Bridge over Sandy Channel, Kennedy Developmental Road (Outback Way).

== See also ==
- Highways in Australia
- List of highways in the Northern Territory
- List of highways in Queensland
- List of highways in Western Australia

== Sources ==
- Lucas, Jarrod; Ward, Nicholas R.; Silva, Ivo da (6 September 2026). "Outback Way negotiations near completion for $1.2b 'shortcut' through central Australia". ABC News.
