= UTC+09:30 =

Time zone

- Time zone
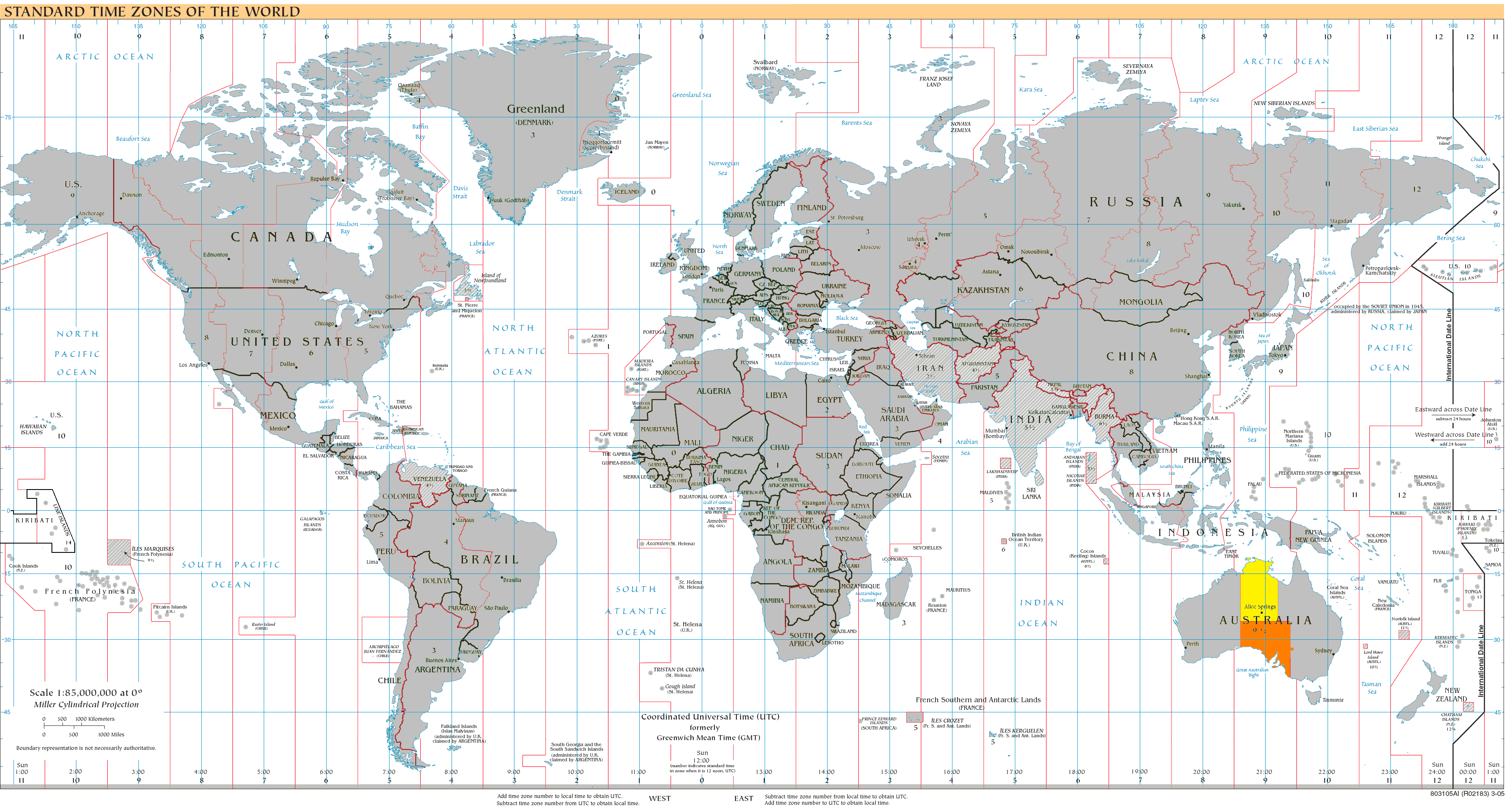
- World map with the time zone highlighted

UTC offset
- UTC: UTC+09:30

Current time
- 18:25, 16 October 2026 UTC+09:30 [refresh]

Central meridian
- 142.5 degrees E

Date-time group
- I*

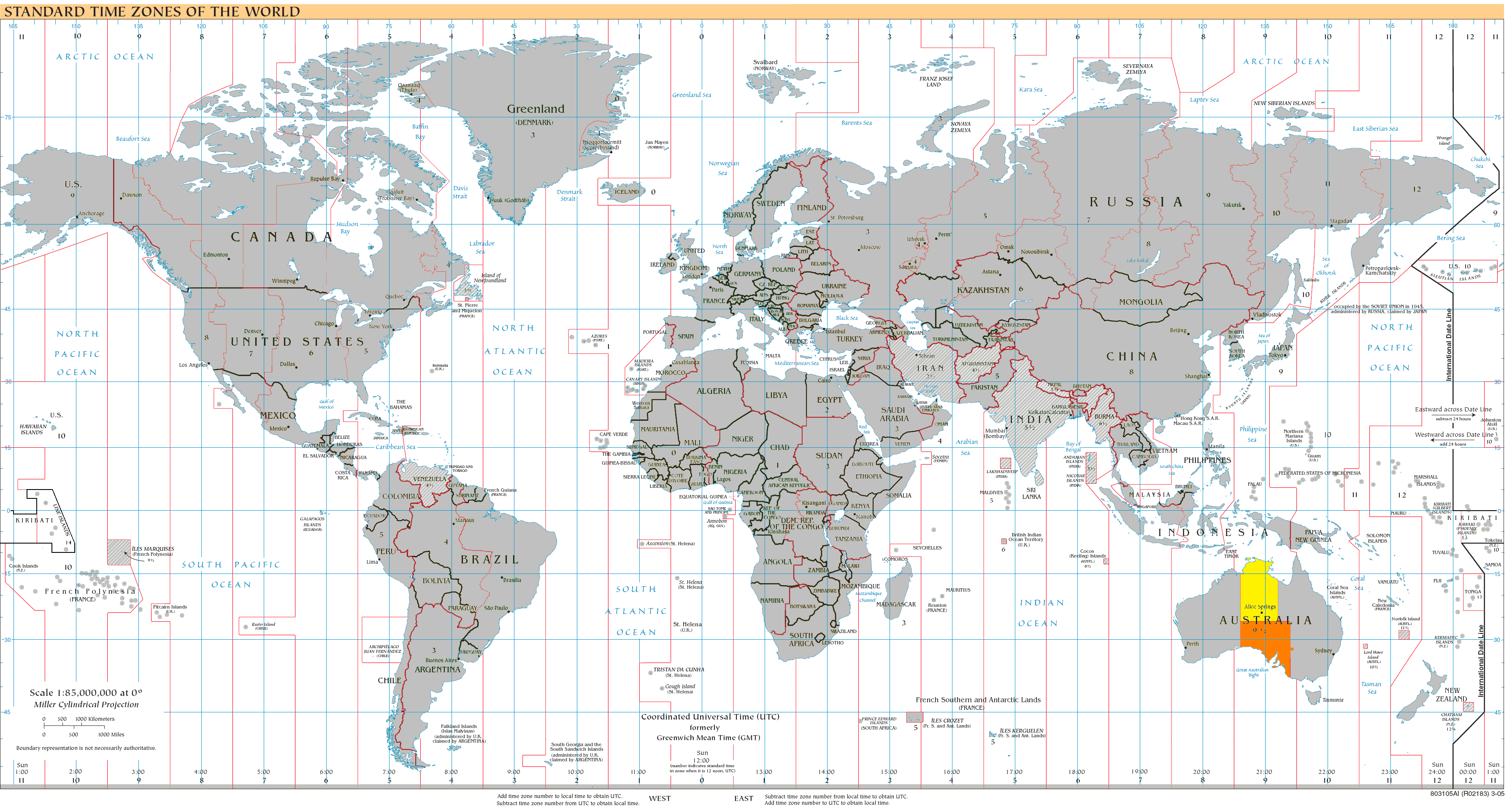
UTC+09:30: blue (December), orange (April), yellow (year-round), light blue (sea areas)

Time in Australia: Standard / DST / Zone; UTC+08:00 (year round) / / Western Time; UTC+09:30 (year round) / / Central Time; UTC+09:30 / UTC+10:30 / Central Time; UTC+10:00 (year round) / / Eastern Time; UTC+10:00 / UTC+11:00 / Eastern Time; UTC+10:30 / UTC+11:00 / Lord Howe Island

UTC+09:30 is an identifier for a time offset from UTC of +09:30.

== As standard time (year-round) ==
Principal cities: Darwin, Alice Springs

=== Oceania ===
- Australia – Central Standard Time (ACST)
  - Northern Territory
  - South Australia
    - APY Lands (de facto does not use daylight savings time)

== As standard time (Southern Hemisphere winter) ==
Principal cities: Adelaide, Broken Hill

=== Oceania ===
- Australia – Central Standard Time (ACST)
  - New South Wales
    - All of Yancowinna County, including Broken Hill
  - South Australia, including de jure APY Lands and Border Village
  - Western Australia
    - Giles Weather Station (for meteorological reporting only; ACST also used operationally until 2024)

== Historical usage ==
=== As standard time (year-round) ===
Asia
- Indonesia (Dutch, United Nations, and Indonesian administrations)
  - Western New Guinea (1944–1963)
Oceania
- Australia
  - Western Australia
    - Papulankutja
    - Wingellina
    - Warakurna Community
    - Tjukurla Community
    - Kiwirrkurra Community (–2024)

=== As daylight saving time (Northern Hemisphere summer) ===
Asia
- South Korea (1955–1960) as "KDT" +09:30; also trialled in 1948–1951 and 1987–1988 using a different time zone.

== See also ==
- Time in Australia
