= Yeo Lake =

Ephemeral salt lake in Western Australia

- Location within Western Australia Location within Australia
- Interactive map of Yeo Lake
- Location: Goldfields-Esperance, Western Australia
- Coordinates: 27°58′12″S 124°22′28″E
- Type: Ephemeral
- Basin countries: Australia
- Max. length: 66 km (41 mi)
- Max. width: 14 km (8.7 mi)
- Surface elevation: 349 m (1,145 ft)

Yeo Lake is an ephemeral salt lake in the south of Western Australia, lying in the Great Victoria Desert east of Cosmo Newberry. The Anne Beadell Highway runs along its southern margin, and the Great Central Road lies further to its north. Its surface elevation is 349 metres above mean sea-level.

== Nature reserve ==
The Yeo Lake Nature Reserve is set aside for biological diversity in semi-arid and arid areas of Australia, and camping is permitted. The reserve covers the entire lake system.

== See also ==
- Cosmo Newberry
