= Tjirrkarli Community =

Community in Western Australia

Tjirrkarli
- Town
- Coordinates: 26.000887°0′S 125.473131°0′E
- Country: Australia
- State: Western Australia
- LGA(s): Shire of Ngaanyatjarraku
- Location: 120 km (75 mi) west of Warburton

Government
  - State electorate(s): North West Central
  - Federal division(s): O'Connor

Area
  - Total: 800 km^{2} (310 sq mi)

Population
  - Total(s): 4 (SAL 2021)
- Postcode: 0872

Tjirrkarli is an Aboriginal community, located in the Shire of Ngaanyatjarraku within the Goldfields–Esperance region of Western Australia.

== Native title ==
The community is located within the determined Ngaanyatjarra Lands (Part A) (WAD6004/04) native title claim area.

== History ==
Tjirrkarli is named after a nearby site associated with a Dreaming story about native yams.

The community was formed in the 1980s, near a bore put down by the company Shell Oil, who were searching for oil in the area. During this time, many Aboriginals, whose family had left the region decades earlier, returned (by this period, a number of Aboriginals living at Warburton had already left and set up an outstation called Mangi, relatively close to Tjirrkarli; many moved to Tjirrkarli). Others came from Cosmo Newberry and as far away as Wiluna.

In 1987, the community became incorporated and a member of the Ngaanyatjarra Council.

== Governance ==
The community is managed through its incorporated body, Tjirrkarli (Aboriginal Corporation), incorporated under the Aboriginal Councils and Associations Act 1976 on 24 March 1987.

== Town planning ==
Tjirrkarli Layout Plan No.1 has been prepared in accordance with State Planning Policy 3.2 Aboriginal Settlements. Layout Plan No.1 was endorsed by the community on 3 December 2003 and the Western Australian Planning Commission on 29 June 2004. The Layout Plan map-set and background report can be viewed at Planning Western Australia's web site.
