= Jackie Junction =

Road junction in Western Australia

Coordinates: 25°42′27″S 126°39′47″E

Jackie Junction Western Australia
- Jackie Junction location map

General information
- Type: Road junction
- Junction type: T-Junction
- Location: Gibson Desert, 69 km (43 mi) north of Warburton
- Opened: 16 August 1958
- Built by: Gunbarrel Road Construction Party
- Roads at junction: Gunbarrel Highway; Giles to Warburton road

Jackie Junction is a remote location in Western Australia on the Gunbarrel Highway. It was named by the road builder Len Beadell after his youngest daughter and is at the junction of the original Gunbarrel Highway and the road to Warburton. It is 69 kilometres (43 mi) north of Warburton.

== History ==
In May 1958 during survey work to determine the course of the Gunbarrel Highway, Beadell travelled through virgin scrub from Giles to Warburton, an existing Aboriginal mission station. He selected the location approximately 65 kilometres (40 mi) north of Warburton as the commencement point for the next section of the Gunbarrel Highway. Survey westward from Jackie Junction took place from 14–28 May 1958, a road from Jackie Junction to Warburton was built in late August 1958, and construction of the final section of Gunbarrel Highway began on 3 September 1958 towards Carnegie Station. The road was completed on 15 November 1958.

== Gallery ==
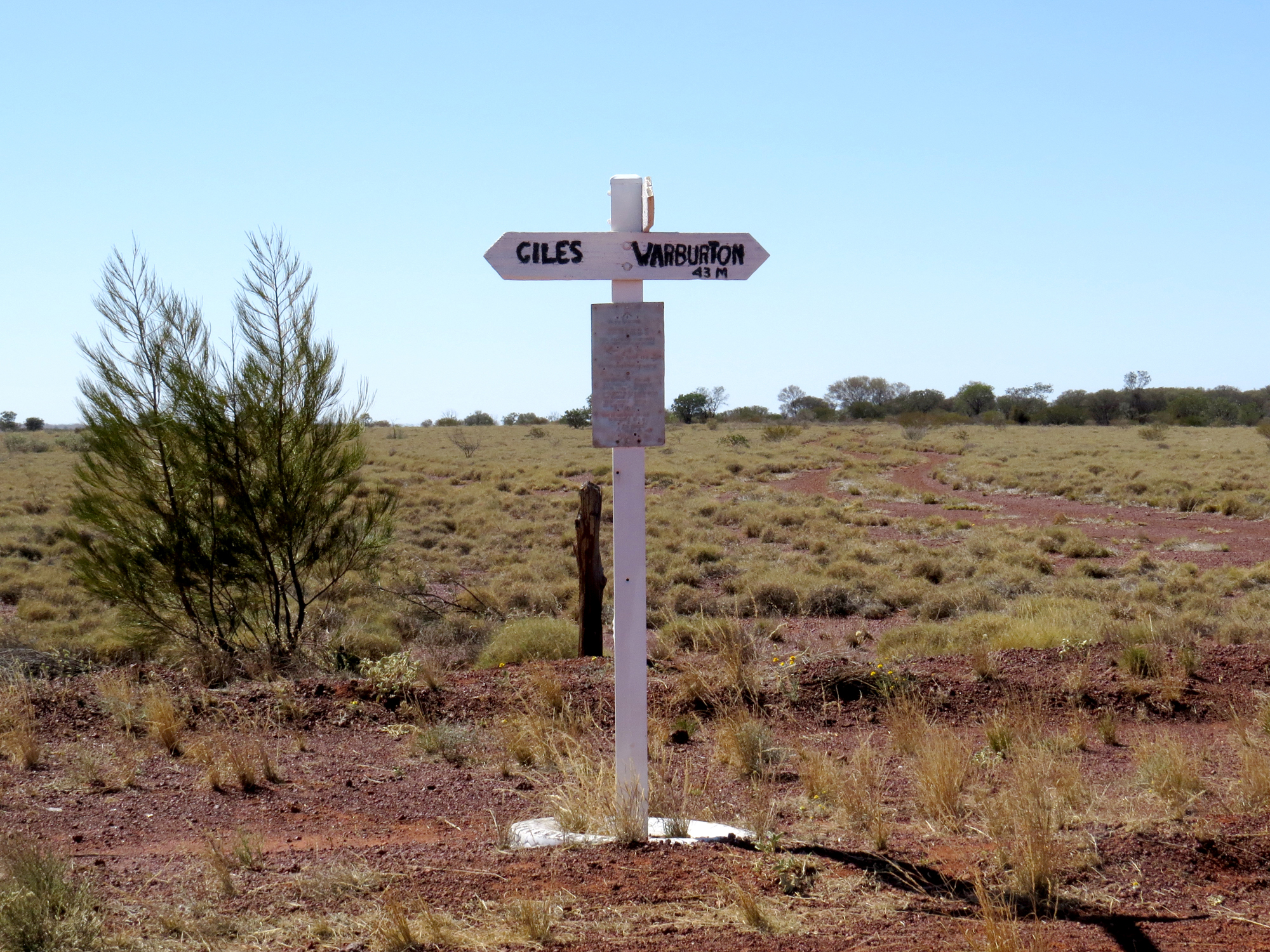
Signpost at Jackie Junction

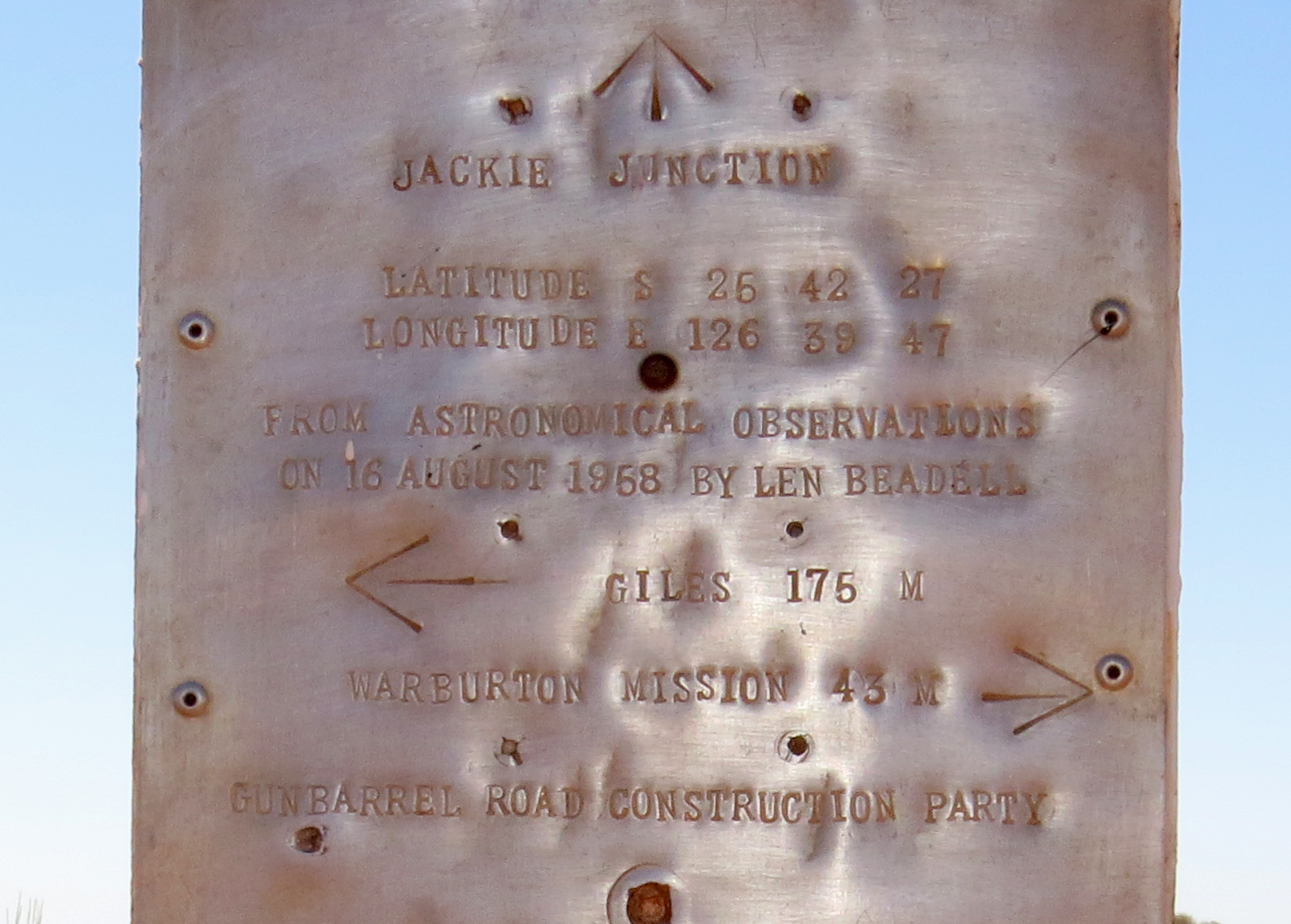
Detail of the plaque on the signpost
