= Acacia basedowii =

Basedow's wattle

Scientific classification
- Kingdom: Plantae
- Clade: Tracheophytes
- Clade: Angiosperms
- Clade: Eudicots
- Clade: Rosids
- Order: Fabales
- Family: Fabaceae
- Subfamily: Caesalpinioideae
- Clade: Mimosoid clade
- Genus: Acacia
- Species: A. basedowii

Binomial name
- Acacia basedowii Maiden
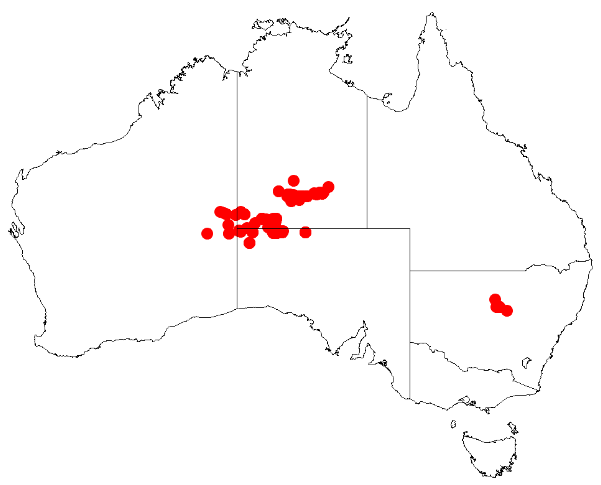
- Acacia basedowii occurrence data from Australasian Virtual Herbarium

Synonyms
- Acacia basedowi Blakely orth. var.; Acacia basedowi var. viridis Blakely orth. var.; Acacia basedowii Maiden var. basedowii; Acacia basedowii var. viridis Blakely; Acacia ulicina var. oxyclada Tate nom. inval., nom. nud.; Racosperma basedowii (Maiden) Pedley

Species of shrub

Acacia basedowii, commonly known as Basedow's wattle, is a species of flowering plant in the family Fabaceae and is endemic to arid parts of Central Australia. It is a low, spreading, divaricate shrub with spiny branchlets, upright, linear to lance-shaped or narrowly oblong phyllodes, spherical to slightly oblong heads of yellow flowers and linear, curved or twisted pods raised over the seeds.

== Description ==
Acacia basedowii is a low, spreading, divaricate shrub that typically grows to a height of 0.5–1 m (1 ft 8 in – 3 ft 3 in). Its branchlets are slender and spiny with a white, flaking surface. The phyllodes are upright, linear to lance-shaped with the narrower end towards the base or narrowly oblong, flattened, 5–20 mm (0.20–0.79 in) long and 1–2 mm (0.039–0.079 in) wide, more or less glabrous and usually green. The flowers are borne in one or two spherical or slightly oblong heads in leaf axils on a peduncle 5–12 mm (0.20–0.47 in) long, each head usually with 25 to 35 yellow flowers. Flowering occurs from April to October and the pods are linear, curved or twisted 10–70 mm (0.39–2.76 in) long, 2–4 mm (0.079–0.157 in) wide and raised over the seeds.

== Taxonomy ==
Acacia basedowii was first formally described in 1920 by the botanist Joseph Maiden in the Journal and Proceedings of the Royal Society of New South Wales from specimens collected in the Musgrave Ranges by Herbert Basedow in 1903. The specific epithet honours the collector of the type specimens.

== Distribution and habitat ==
Basedow's wattle grows on rocky slopes and stony watercourses, in firm red sandy soils, often with Triodia species, from the Rawlinson Ranges and Skirmish Hill in Western Australia and east to the Macdonnell Ranges in the Northern Territory and the Musgrave Ranges in South Australia.

== See also ==
- List of Acacia species
