= Warakurna Community =

Community in Western Australia

Warakurna
- Town
- Interactive map of Warakurna
- Coordinates: 25.015°0′S 128.299°0′E
- Country: Australia
- State: Western Australia
- LGA: Shire of Ngaanyatjarraku
- Location: 260 km (160 mi) north east of Warburton; 830 km (520 mi) southwest of Alice Springs

Government
  - State electorate: North West Central
  - Federal division: O'Connor

Area
  - Total: 51.8 km^{2} (20.0 sq mi)

Population
  - Total: 268 (UCL 2016)
- Time zone: UTC+8:00 (AWST)
- Postcode: 6642
- Mean max temp: 29.4 °C (84.9 °F)
- Mean min temp: 15.9 °C (60.6 °F)
- Annual rainfall: 287.8 mm (11.33 in)

Warakurna is a large Aboriginal community, located in the Goldfields-Esperance region of Western Australia, within the Shire of Ngaanyatjarraku and is situated on the Great Central Road (part of the Outback Way ultimately connecting Perth to Cairns diagonally across Australia). It is at the western end of the Rawlinson Ranges. At the 2016 census, Warakurna had a population of 268, including 237 who identified as Aboriginal Australians, most of whom speak Ngaanyatjarra at home.

== History ==
In the early 1970s several factors, including the availability of government funding for outstations, easier road access, and over-crowding at Docker River (Kaltukatjara) settlement and Warburton Mission, all combined to make the location of Giles Weather Station ideal for a new community. The Warakurna community became incorporated in 1976 and a member of the Ngaanyatjarra Council in 1981.

On 1 July 2024, the community switched from Australian Central Standard Time (UTC +9:30) to the regular time zone for Western Australia, Australian Western Standard Time (UTC+08:00).

== Native title ==
The community is located within the determined Ngaanyatjarra Lands (Part A) (WAD6004/04) native title claim area.

== Town planning ==
Warakurna Layout Plan No.1 was prepared in accordance with State Planning Policy 3.2 Aboriginal Settlements and was endorsed by the community in 2003 and the Western Australian Planning Commission in 2004.

== Facilities ==
Children of school age at Warakurna attend the Warakurna campus of the Ngaanyatjarra Lands School which was formed in 2007 by administratively combining nine remote campuses in the Ngaanyatjarra lands. Warakurna campus caters to year nine, then students must transfer to the larger campus at Warburton.

The community is serviced by the Giles Airstrip which provides a 24-hour all-weather 1,600-metre (5,200 ft) gravel runway with two services weekly to Alice Springs, and Royal Flying Doctor Service transport as required. It also has a community hall, women's centre, health clinic, football oval, basketball court and 25-metre indoor swimming pool.

The first Indigenous-run police station in Western Australia is at Warakurna, set up some years ago and already showing some positive effects. Filmmaker Cornel Ozies, who made a documentary about the station, called Our Law and shown at the 2020 Sydney Film Festival, puts the success of the program down to four things: "respect, understanding, communication, and education". The two Noongar police officers learned the local Ngaanyatjarra language and cultural protocols of the people.

== In popular culture ==
Warakurna is the namesake of the fifth track in the Midnight Oil album Diesel and Dust (1987).
