= Walter MacDougall =

Australian missionary (1907–1976)

Walter Batchelor MacDougall (6 April 1907 – 5 May 1976) was an Australian missionary and patrol officer who worked with the Indigenous peoples in the desert regions of Western Australia and South Australia.

== Biography ==
MacDougall was born in Mornington, the fifth son of a Scottish Presbyterian minister. After some years in Tasmania, his family returned to Melbourne where he matriculated from Scotch College in 1922. For eight years (1931–1939) he served as an assistant minister at the Presbyterian mission at Port George IV (Kunmunya) in the Kimberley region of Western Australia. In 1940, he took up an appointment at the Ernabella mission in the north western corner of South Australia, and picked up a working knowledge of Pitjantjatjara. Despite a physical disability from a bullet wound to his hand, which resulted in his losing a thumb and finger, he managed to be enlisted in the army and worked in a transport division in northern Australia until his discharge in 1944.

In 1947, he was hired to work, on the basis of his extensive experience with Aboriginal communities, as a patrol officer attached to the Woomera Test Range. As Britain began to undertake weapons testing and experiments on the atomic bomb at Emu Field and Maralinga, MacDougall was delegated to shift people out of the affected area down to the Yalata. In 1956, he was promoted to the position of Protector of Aborigines in Western Australia and by that time was responsible for patrolling some 400,000 sq. miles of desert terrain, together with a new officer, Robert Macauley, with whom he had personal differences.

MacDougall believed the Aboriginal population should be gradually assimilated into the mainstream. He stated that:

'We have taken away their beliefs and customs and trespassed on their lands, and we have a moral obligation to give them something in return'.

At the same time, he found himself at odds with officials overseeing areas where military installations were planned and armament experiments conducted. MacDougall surveyed specific localities containing ceremonial zones and sacred sites to inform the government authorities to avoid intruding there to avoid giving offense. He was strongly opposed to the establishment of the Giles Weather Station in the Rawlinson Ranges since it lay on tribal land. The authorities feared him for his forthright criticism based on a deep knowledge of the indigenous societies. He threatened to go to the newspapers on one occasion and was warned not to meddle with political or policy issues.

MacDougall retired after 25 years of service and died of a combination of pneumonia and pericarditis at Heidelberg in 1976. His biographer W.H. Edwards cites as a suitable, complimentary epitaph for MacDougall a hostile put-down made by a scientist involved in the atomic arms testing. MacDougall had placed:

'the affairs of a handful of natives above those of the British Commonwealth of Nations'.

== Notes and references ==
=== References ===
- Arnold, L.; Smith, M. (2006). Britain, Australia and the Bomb: The Nuclear Tests and their Aftermath. Palgrave Macmillan. ISBN 978-0-230-62733-8.
- Cross, Roger (2003). "British Nuclear tests and the Indigenous People of Australia". In Barnaby, Frank; Holdstock, Douglas (eds.). The British Nuclear Weapons Programme, 1952–2002. Frank Cass. pp. 75–88. ISBN 978-1-135-76197-4.
- Edwards, W. H. (2000). "MacDougall, Walter Batchelor (1907–1976)". In Ritchie, John; Langmore, Diane (eds.). Australian Dictionary of Biography. Vol. 15. Melbourne University Press. ISBN 978-0-522-84843-4.
- Lindell, Geoffrey; Bennett, R. L. (2006). Parliament: The Vision in Hindsight. Federation Press. ISBN 978-1-862-87406-0.
- Milliken, Robert (1986). No conceivable injury. Penguin Books. ISBN 978-0-140-08438-2.
