= Giles Airport =

- IATA: none; ICAO: YGLS

Summary
- Location: Giles Weather Station
- Opened: 1956
- Elevation AMSL: 579 ft / 176 m
- Coordinates: 25.0436993°S 128.2960052°E

Map

Runways
Direction	Length		Surface
Direction	ft	m	Surface
12/30	5,249	1,600

Giles Airport services the Warakurna Community and the Giles Weather Station in eastern Western Australia. The airstrip was built during April and May 1956 by a team led by Len Beadell as part of establishing the weather station for the British nuclear tests at Maralinga and the Woomera Test Range. It is adjacent to the Gunbarrel Highway (also constructed by Beadell) and the more recently constructed Great Central Road.
