= Latitude Hill =

Latitude Hill may refer to:

- Latitude Hill (Tennessee)
- Latitude Hill (Houtman Abrolhos), a hill on North Island in the Houtman Abrolhos, in the Indian Ocean off the west coast of Australia
- Latitude Hill (Great Victoria Desert), a hill in the Great Victoria Desert, Western Australia
