= Ian Ward =

Ian Ward may refer to:

- Ian Ward (cricketer) (born 1972), English cricketer
- Ian Ward (physicist) (1928–2018), British physicist
- Ian Ward (athlete) (1929–2006), English pole vaulter
- Ian Ward (character), a character on the American soap opera The Young and the Restless
- Mr Ward (1961–2008), named Ian Ward, Australian Aboriginal elder

== See also ==
- Iain Ward (born 1983), English footballer
