= Major roads in the Goldfields–Esperance region of Western Australia =

Main Roads Western Australia controls the major roads in the state's Goldfields–Esperance region. While the region is the state's largest, the major roads are restricted to the region's western and southern edges. From the major population centres of Kalgoorlie and Coolgardie, Great Eastern Highway heads west towards Perth via the Wheatbelt (Western Australia); Coolgardie–Esperance Highway leads south to the port of Esperance via Norseman; and Goldfields Highway proceeds north to Wiluna and then on to the Mid West Region. From Norseman, Eyre Highway takes interstate traffic east across the Nullarbor Plain and into South Australia.

The main roads in the region are important for multiple aspects of the region's economy. This is primarily mining activities, but also includes pastoral and agricultural exports via Esperance port, tourism to both coastal and inland destinations, and interstate freight traffic, with approximately two million tonnes transported annually along the Great Eastern, Coolgardie–Esperance and Eyre highways.

== Anzac Drive ==
Anzac Drive
- Location: West Kalgoorlie – Broadwood
- Length: 7.04 km (4.37 mi)

Anzac Drive is a main road just outside Kalgoorlie. It connecting Great Eastern Highway with Goldfields Highway, providing a bypass to the south-west of the town.

== Agnew Sandstone Road ==
Agnew Sandstone Road (Goldfields–Esperance region)
- Location: Leinster
- Length: 56.66 km (35.21 mi)

Agnew Sandstone Road is a main east-west road near the north-western edge of the Goldfields–Esperance region. From the Mid West region east of Sandstone, it travels east to Goldfields Highway at Leinster.

== Coolgardie–Esperance Highway ==
Coolgardie–Esperance Highway
- Location: Coolgardie – Esperance
- Length: 370.74 km (230.37 mi)
- Route number: National Highway 94; National Route 1

Coolgardie–Esperance Highway is a main north–south road in the Goldfields–Esperance region linking Coolgardie and Esperance. The southernmost section that bypasses Esperance is named Harbour Road.

== Eyre Highway ==
Eyre Highway (Goldfields–Esperance region)
- Location: Norseman – Eucla
- Length: 720.71 km (447.83 mi)
- Route number: National Highway 1

Eyre Highway runs east from Norseman on the Coolgardie–Esperance Highway to the South Australian border near Eucla.

== Goldfields Highway ==
Goldfields Highway (Goldfields–Esperance region)
- Location: Wiluna – Widgiemooltha
- Length: 660.09 km (410.16 mi)
- Route number: Alternate National Route 94

In the Goldfields–Esperance region, Goldfields Highway starts at Wiluna, continuing on from the Mid West region east of Meekatharra. It leads south to Coolgardie–Esperance Highway at Widgiemooltha, south of Kalgoorlie. Between Kalgoorlie and Coolgardie–Esperance Highway, the highway is part of Alternate National Route 94.

== Great Eastern Highway ==
Great Eastern Highway (Goldfields–Esperance region)
- Location: Victoria Rock – Kalgoorlie
- Length: 159.79 km (99.29 mi)
- Route number: National Highway 94; Alternate National Route 94

Great Eastern Highway is the main connection through to Perth. From the edge of the Wheatbelt, at the Boorabbin National Park, it heads east, to the town of Coolgardie. Three hundred metres (980 ft) beyond the townsite, traffic bound for South Australia turns south onto Coolgardie–Esperance Highway, following the National Highway 94 route. Great Eastern Highway, now signposted as Alternate National Route 94, turns north-east, travelling through another 32 kilometres (20 mi) of scrubland to the outskirts of Kalgoorlie. The road continues its journey eastward within the grid of Kalgoorlie's road system, initially passing by the industrial district of West Kalgoorlie. After 1.9 kilometres (1.2 mi), the highway once more becomes a dual carriageway, and travels past residential neighbourhoods. Following 1.2 kilometres (0.75 mi), the highway takes on the name Hannan Street, and continues for 3.5 kilometres (2.2 mi) through to downtown Kalgoorlie, terminating at Goldfields Highway on Kalgoorlie's eastern edge. Alternate Route 94 turns south, back towards the National Highway route.

== Leonora Laverton Road ==
Leonora Laverton Road
- Location: Leonora – Laverton
- Length: 123.78 km (76.91 mi)

Leonora Laverton Road heads east from Leonora on Goldfields Highway to Laverton, at the western end of the Great Central Road.

== South Coast Highway ==
South Coast Highway (Goldfields–Esperance region)
- Location: East Munglinup – Chadwick
- Length: 102.71 km (63.82 mi)

South Coast Highway heads west from the outskirts of Esperance, close to the coast, continuing into the Great Southern region near Munglinup.

== See also ==
- List of highways in Western Australia
- List of road routes in Western Australia
- List of major roads in rural Western Australia
- Major roads in the Gascoyne region of Western Australia
- Major roads in the Kimberley region of Western Australia
- Major roads in the Mid West region of Western Australia
- Major roads in the Pilbara region of Western Australia
- Major roads in the Wheatbelt region of Western Australia
- Tourist Drives in Western Australia
