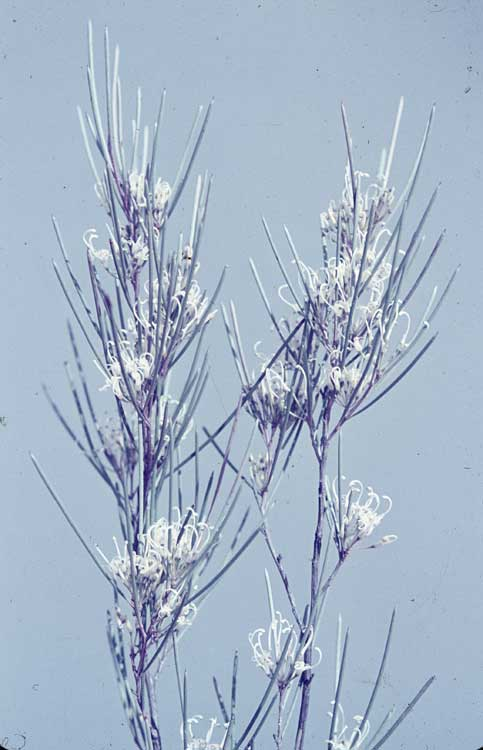
- Near Kalgoorlie

Conservation status
- Least Concern (IUCN 3.1)

Scientific classification
- Kingdom: Plantae
- Clade: Embryophytes
- Clade: Tracheophytes
- Clade: Spermatophytes
- Clade: Angiosperms
- Clade: Eudicots
- Order: Proteales
- Family: Proteaceae
- Genus: Grevillea
- Species: G. acacioides

Binomial name
- Grevillea acacioides C.A.Gardner ex. McGill.

= Grevillea acacioides =

Species of shrub endemic to Western Australia

Grevillea acacioides is a species of flowering plant in the family Proteaceae and is endemic to inland Western Australia. It is an erect shrub with cylindrical leaves and erect groups of greenish-white or cream-coloured flowers.

== Description ==
Grevillea acacioides is an erect, multi-branched shrub that typically grows to a height of 1.0–2.2 m (3 ft 3 in – 7 ft 3 in). Its leaves are cylindrical, mostly 30–70 mm (1.2–2.8 in) long and 0.8–1.1 mm (0.031–0.043 in) wide with a sharply pointed tip. The flowers are arranged in erect groups on a flowering stem less than 2 mm (0.079 in) long at the end of branches and in leaf axils, the perianth greenish-white to cream-coloured and bearded inside and the pistil 10–12.5 mm (0.39–0.49 in) long. Flowering mainly occurs from July to September and the fruit is a glabrous follicle mostly 9–13 mm (0.35–0.51 in) long.

== Taxonomy ==
Grevillea acacioides was first formally described in 1986 by Donald McGillivray in his book New Names in Grevillea (Proteaceae), based on plant material collected from east of Sandstone by Charles Austin Gardner in 1931. The specific epithet (acacioides) means "Acacia-like".

== Distribution and habitat ==
This grevillea usually grows in shrubland and is widespread between Cosmo Newbery, Wiluna, Perenjori, Ravensthorpe and Queen Victoria Spring in inland Western Australia.

== Conservation status ==
Grevillea acacioides is listed as least concern on the IUCN Red List of Threatened Species. It is common and widespread, its population is stable and it does not face any known threats currently or in the near future.
