= Tjukayirla Roadhouse =

Remote roadhouse, in Western Australia

Coordinates: 27°09′16″S 124°34′27″E

Tjukayirla Roadhouse (commonly pronounced "Chook-a-year-la") is a remote roadhouse on the Great Central Road in Western Australia. It is located in the Shire of Laverton and operated by the Papulankutja (Blackstone) Community, one of the founding members of the Ngaanyatjarra Council.

The roadhouse offers various styles of accommodation, including twin-share rooms, self-contained units, and a powered campground with facilities for caravans and tents.

The name of the roadhouse derives from the Tjukayirla rockholes, which are located at the southwest end of the campground.

Nearby attractions include the marker erected by surveyors Harry L. Paine and Hugh C. Barclay in 1931 on their expedition to the Warburton Ranges, known as the Paine & Barclay Survey Marker. The closest rockhole to the marker is the Winduldarra Rockhole.

The nearest fuel available is 222 kilometres (138 mi) to the west at Cosmo Newbery. The nearest fuel to the east is at Warburton, 247 kilometres (153 mi) away.
