= Papulankutja =

Community in Western Australia

- Interactive map of Papulankutja
- Coordinates: 26.015°0′S 128.251°0′E
- Country: Australia
- State: Western Australia
- LGA: Shire of Ngaanyatjarraku
- Location: 200 km (120 mi) east of Warburton

Government
  - State electorate: North West Central
  - Federal division: O'Connor

Area
  - Total: 20.8 km^{2} (8.0 sq mi)

Population
  - Total: 162 (SAL 2021)
- Time zone: UTC+8:00 (AWST)
- Postcode: 6642

Papulankutja (also referred to as Blackstone) is a large Aboriginal community located in the Goldfields–Esperance region of Western Australia, within the Shire of Ngaanyatjarraku.

== History ==
The community exists on the traditional lands of the Ngaanyatjarra people, many of whom were transported in the 1960s to Warburton mission. In the 1970s, Ngaanyatjarra people returned to the region from Warburton mission. Since this time the community has steadily grown in size and population.

On 1 July 2024, the community switched from Australian Central Standard Time (UTC +9:30) to the regular time zone for Western Australia, Australian Western Standard Time (UTC+08:00).

=== Native title ===
The community is located within the determined Ngaanyatjarra Lands (Part A) (WAD6004/04) native title claim area, determined on 26 June 2005.

== Town planning ==
Papulankutja Layout Plan No. 2 was endorsed in March 2013, with seven amendments up to November 2020.

== Governance ==
The community is managed through its incorporated body, Papulankutia Community Incorporated, which is one of several communities managed by the Ngaanyatjarra Council. The Council is an Aboriginal corporation, incorporated in March 1981, that is the main body overseeing in a large group of Ngaanyatjarra service delivery organisations, some of which are separately incorporated.

The Yarnangu Ngaanyatijarraku Parna Aboriginal Corporation was incorporated under the Corporations (Aboriginal and Torres Strait Islander) Act 2006, and acts as the prescribed body corporate for the Ngaanyatjarra native title determination.

== Tjukayirla Roadhouse ==
Tjukayirla Roadhouse, located 450 km (280 mi) along the Great Central Road, was built and is operated by the Papulankutja Community. The roadhouse takes its name from Tjukayirla Rockholes nearby.
