= Great Central Road =

Track in Western Australia and the Northern Territory

Great Central Road Western Australia–Northern Territory
- Great Central Road (blue and white)
- Coordinates: 28.625981°S 122.405664°E (WSW end); 25°14′S 130°59′E (ENE end)

General information
- Type: Road
- Length: 1,126 km (700 mi)

Major junctions
- WSW end: Laverton
- ENE end: Yulara

Restrictions
- Fuel supply: Laverton (28°37′S 122°24′E), Cosmo Newberry, Tjukayirla Roadhouse, Warburton (26°13′S 126°39′E), Warakurna Roadhouse, Docker River and Yulara (25°14′S 130°59′E)

The Great Central Road is a mostly unsealed Australian highway that runs 1,126 km (700 mi) from Laverton, Western Australia to Yulara, Northern Territory . It passes through a number of small communities on the way. It is called Tjukaruru Road between the NT border and its junction with Kata Tjuta Road, and some consider that junction to be its northeastern end, 48 km from Yulara and the Lasseter Highway.

The Great Central Road (GCR) forms part of the Outback Way which goes all the way to Winton, Queensland, and is being developed as the third east–west transcontinental highway across Australia.

== History ==
The Great Central Road has its origins in the early 1930s when Warburton was established as a missionary settlement, and supplies were delivered from Laverton via a rough bush track.

By the mid-1950s, the track from Laverton had become graded dirt. In 1958 during survey for the Gunbarrel Highway as part of the Woomera rocket range project, Len Beadell visited Warburton and built a new road from Giles via the Rawlinson Range to Warburton. At Jackie Junction 69 km (43 mi) north of Warburton, the Gunbarrel Highway branched from this road towards Carnegie Station further west. Beadell returned to Giles via a different bush track which passed east through the Blackstone Range towards Docker River.

In January 1978 funds were provided to Warburton council by the Government of Western Australia to construct a more direct road from Warburton to Docker River which bypassed part of the twenty-year-old Gunbarrel Highway. The Great Central Road and original Gunbarrel Highway are coincident for 45 km (28 mi) near Giles.

In 1988 the Outback Highway Development Council Inc. (OHDC) was formed as a non-profit alliance of local governments to lobby for the sealing and upgrading of the Outback Way including the Great Central Road.

In 2024, the road was closed for some months due to flooding.

== Road conditions and road sealing updates ==
In May 2026, 736 km remained to seal of the GCR in WA, and 117 km remained to seal of Tjukururu Road in the NT.

The Western Australian road sealing project between Laverton and the NT border is due to be completed in 2032 at a cost of $678 million.

The unsealed sections are graded to a standard suitable for two wheel drive vehicles and caravans. It is on the most direct route from Perth to Uluru with approximately 10,000 vehicles travelling the route annually.

It is recommended that communications equipment be carried while driving on this road.

=== Fuel supplies ===
Laverton and Yulara at each end of the GCR have fuel supplies. In addition in May 2026 the Outback Way website listed three fuel stations on the GCR: Tjukayirla Roadhouse, 300 km from Laverton, Warburton Roadhouse, 560 km from Laverton, and Warakurna Roadhouse, 786 km from Laverton.

== Permits and quarantine restrictions ==
The route also passes directly into Aboriginal reserves and it is a legal requirement for travellers to hold a valid transit permit at the time of travel, even when staying on the Great Central Road.

As of May 2026, the following free permits are required to travel the Great Central Road:

- Great Central Road Laverton to Tjukayirla Roadhouse: apply to WA Dept Planning Lands & Heritage. The application is referred to the Yilka Talintji Aboriginal Corporation.
- Great Central Road Tjukayirla Roadhouse to NT Border: applications via the Ngaanyatjarra Council permit portal.
- Tjukururu Road (the Great Central Road in the Northern Territory between the NT Border and Kata Tjuta Road): applications via the Central Land Council.

When heading from the Northern Territory to Laverton there is an amnesty bin for Quarantine WA 20 km (12 mi) outside of Laverton. All passenger vehicles are to stop and dispose of all quarantine risk material that is stated on the sign, including all fresh fruit, vegetables, honey, seed, potatoes, onions and other such plants. This area has a mobile inspector from time to time and there is risk of fines if travellers are stopped and offending material is found.

== Gallery ==
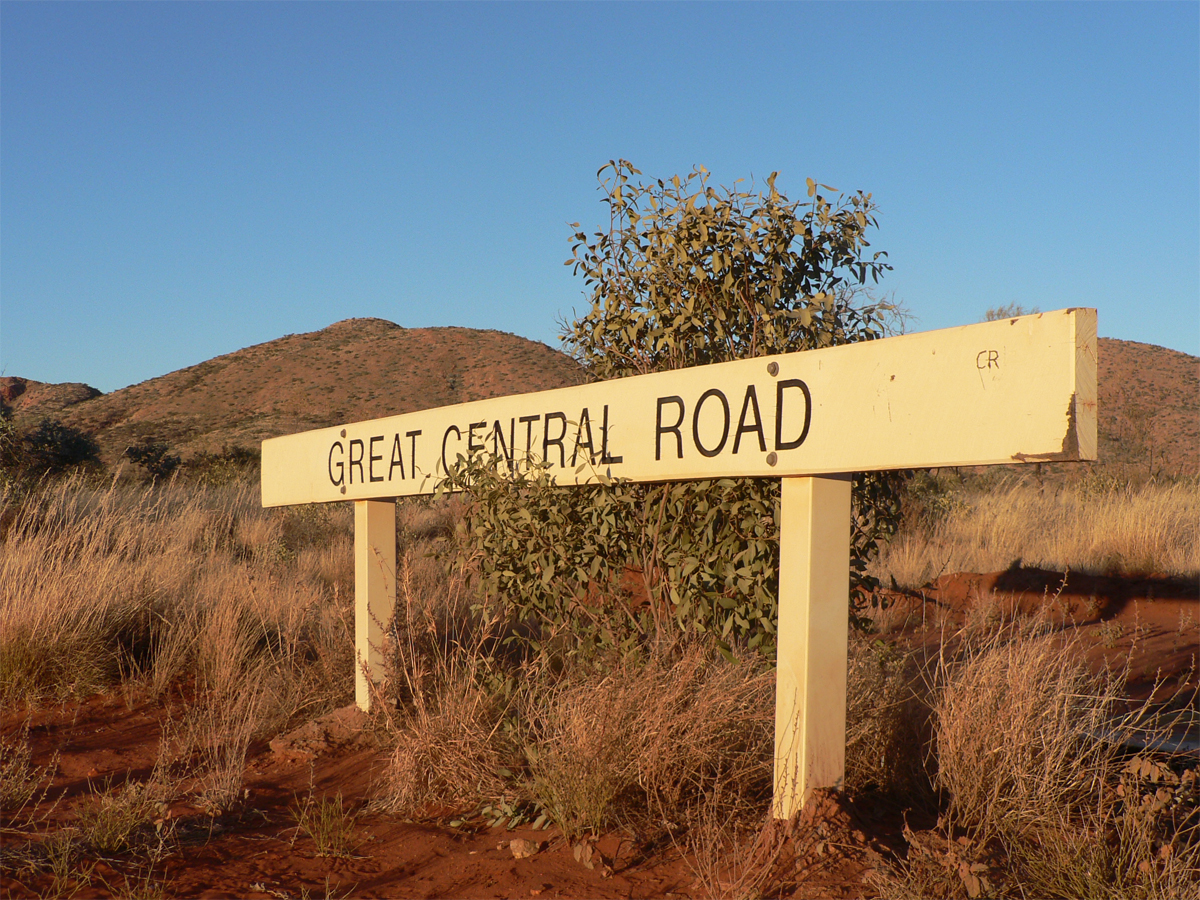
Sign near Giles Weather Station

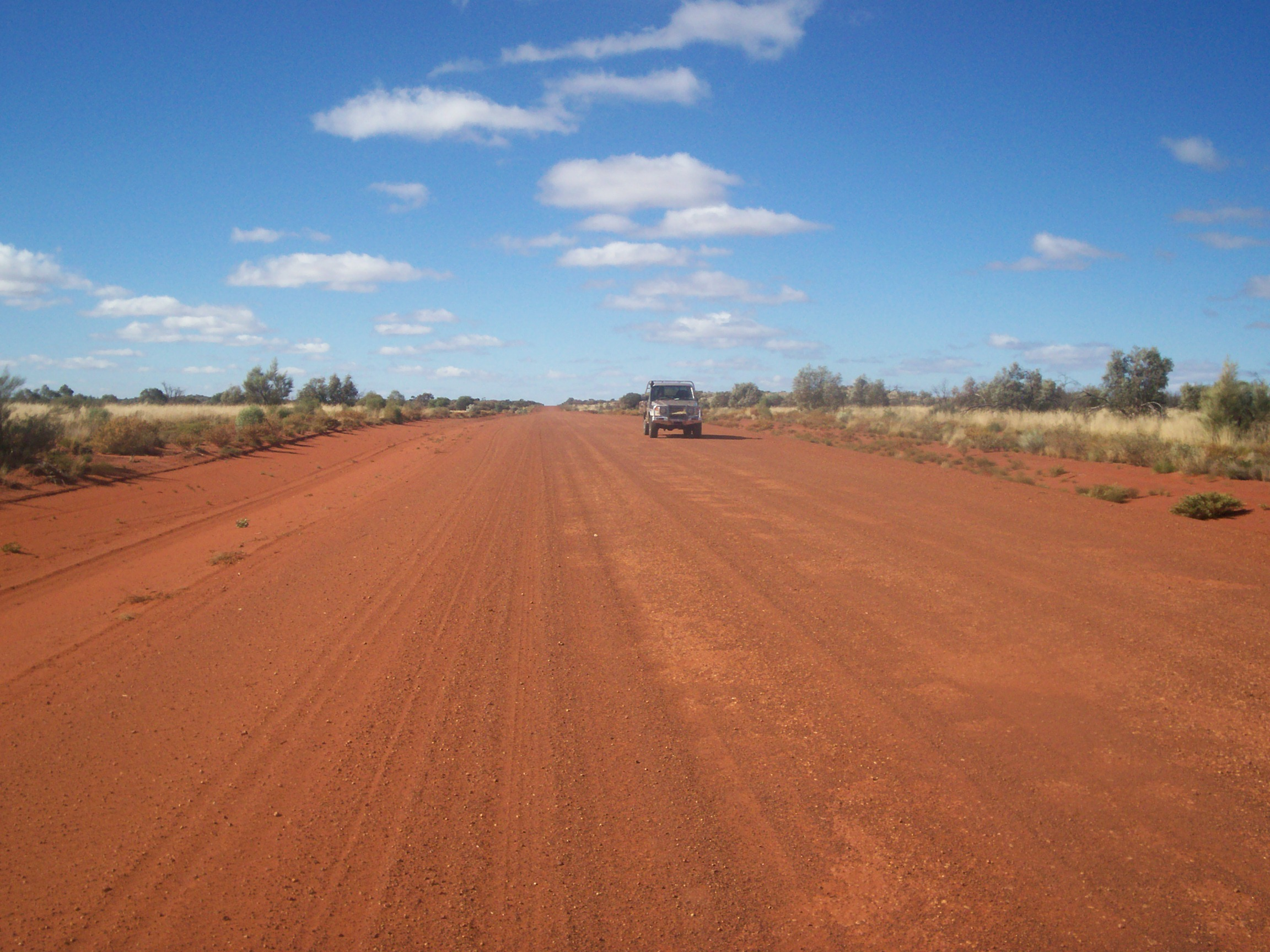
The Great Central Road is of suitable standard for 2WD vehicles

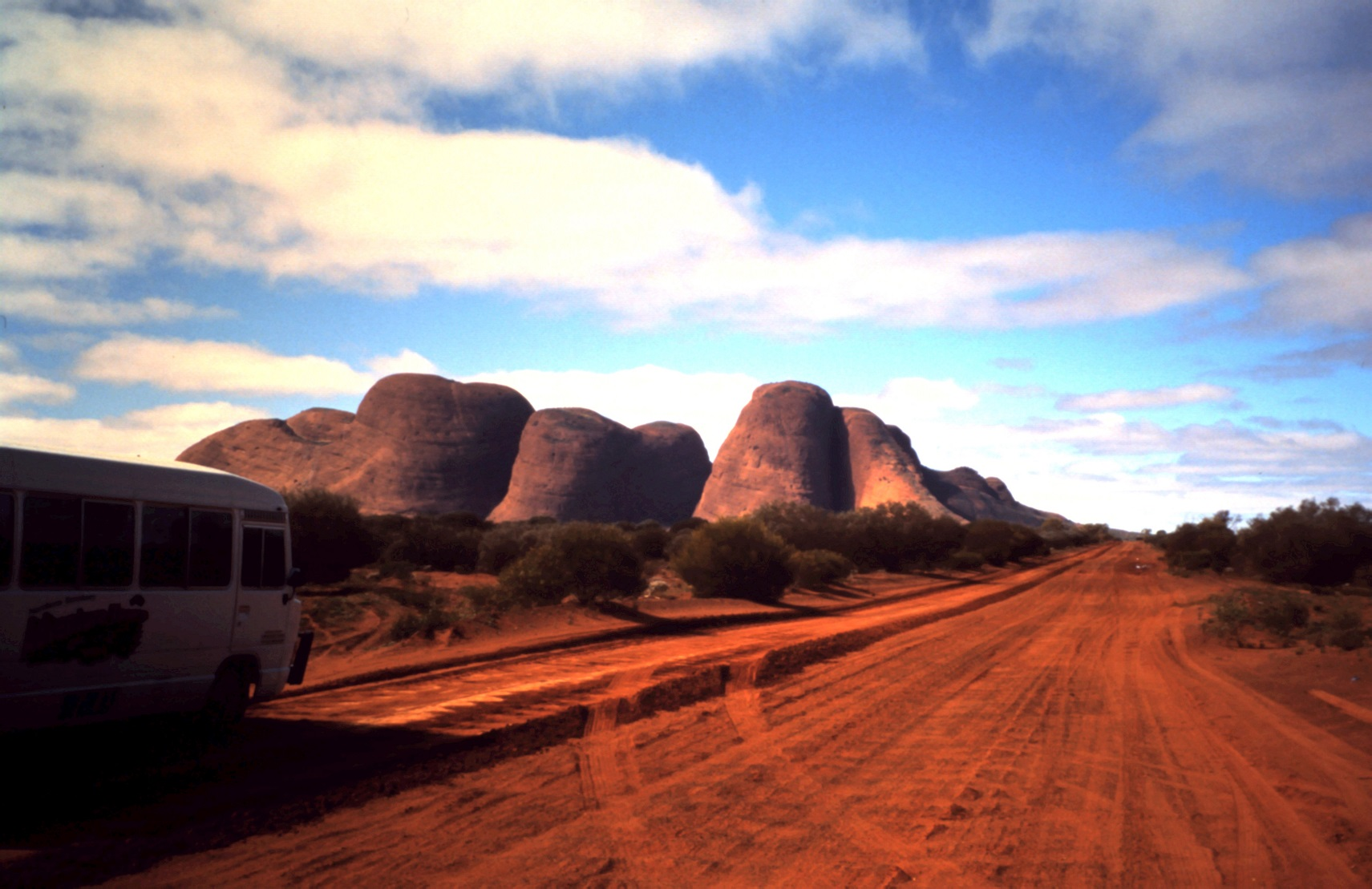
Tjukaruru Road (NT section of Great Central Road) just west of Kata Tjuta

== Attractions ==
The two most notable attractions on this road are Kata Tjuta/The Olgas and Uluru (Ayers Rock), both within the Uluru-Kata Tjuta National Park in the Northern Territory.

On the Western Australian side of the border, other attractions include Tjukayirla Roadhouse, whose name derives from the Tjukayirla rockholes, which are located at the southwest end of the campground. Wildlife can be seen around the roadhouse, including dingoes, emus, kangaroos, camels and many species of birds.

Empress Springs, or Reti, is a significant cultural site for Ngalia people, and is situated on land subject to a native title claim. The site is depicted in a mural on Kalgoorlie Police Station, created by Deeva and Kado Muir in 2018. The springs are inside a cave, located around 60 km (37 mi) north along the David Carnegie Road, the junction of which is along the Great Central Road 15 km (9 mi) west of the roadhouse. Access is via a chain ladder.

Nearby attractions include the marker erected by surveyors Harry L. Paine and Hugh C. Barclay in 1931 on their expedition to the Warburton Ranges, known as the Paine & Barclay Survey Marker. The closest rockhole to the marker is the Winduldarra Rockhole.

Additional attractions include Lasseter's Cave, the Petermann Ranges, Giles Weather Station, the ochre bluff of Giles Breakaway, Lake Throssell, Lake Yeo Nature Reserve, and Peegull Waterhole and Caves.

== Junctions ==
State/Territory	LGA	Location	km	mi	Destinations	Notes
Western Australia	Laverton	Laverton	0	0.0		
Western Australia	Laverton	Cosmo Newbery	85	53		
Western Australia	Ngaanyatjarraku	Tjukayirla Roadhouse	307	191		
Western Australia	Ngaanyatjarraku	Warburton	554	344	Connie Sue Highway – Rawlinna; Gunbarrel Highway – Carnegie	Great Central Road is sometimes considered concurrent with Gunbarrel Highway between Warburton and Warakurna
Western Australia	Ngaanyatjarraku	Warakurna	781	485	Old Gunbarrel Highway	Also Giles Weather Station, Giles Airport
Western Australia	Ngaanyatjarraku	Warakurna	807	501	Gunbarrel Highway – Pipalyatjara, South Australia	
Western Australia	Ngaanyatjarraku	Giles	854	531	Sandy Blight Junction Road – Kintore, Northern Territory	
Northern Territory	MacDonnell Region	Kaltukatjara	870	540		(Formerly Docker River) Great Central Road in Western Australia; Tjukaruru Road in Northern Territory
Northern Territory	unincorporated area	Yulara	1,110	690	Lasseter Highway – Alice Springs, Darwin	
1.000 mi = 1.609 km; 1.000 km = 0.621 mi: Concurrency terminus; Route transition
