= Mr Ward =

Aboriginal elder

Ian Ward (1961 – 27 January 2008), commonly known as Mr Ward in media reports, (Note: Ward's first name was generally not used in media reports in respect for Aboriginal naming customs.) was an Australian Aboriginal elder from Warburton, Western Australia who died after being transported in the back of a prison van in the Western Australian outback.

== Life ==
Ward was filmed as a child leading a traditional life with his family in the 1960s by film maker Ian Dunlop. He was a central community figure at Warburton and in the surrounding lands with a knowledge of culture, land, and art, and was known as a "culture man".

He was involved in forging relationships between his own community and non-Aboriginal communities in Western Australia, elsewhere in Australia and overseas: he was chosen to represent the Ngaanyatjarra lands in a delegation to China. Ward assisted and worked in outback Western Australia with a variety of scientists, geologists, paleontologists, geophysicists and others associated with geological surveying. He had worked as an interpreter in transactions relating to native title. Ward was involved in Landcare, looked after water holes, and baited foxes, dingoes and wild cats. He was a highly skilled hunter, but also assisted many non-indigenous people to see native wildlife such as bilbies and rock wallabies. As an elder, Ward worked for many years in a battle to have the rights of his people in the Gibson Desert Nature Reserve recognised. Ward was a well-known dancer and speaker and created works in glass including the art glass series The Seven Seals of the Ngaanyatjarra Lands.

== Death ==
On 26 January 2008, Ward was arrested by Laverton police and charged with driving under the influence of alcohol. He was then driven 570 kilometres (350 miles) to a courthouse, remanded in custody, and driven a further 352 kilometres (219 miles) to a prison. The van's air conditioning was not working and the temperature was 47 °C (117 °F) that day. Ward had a cut on his head from falling and third-degree burns to his stomach from lying on the metal floor after he fell. It was noticed by the Prison transport contractors G4S driving the vehicle that Ward was unconscious but they did not stop the van to check on him. He died shortly afterwards.

The mode of transport used in Ward's death had already been warned about prior to his death. The response to the circumstances of the death was in part immediate.

== Inquest and response ==
Ward's death was the subject of a coronial inquest. The inquest found the two guards who accompanied him, the company in charge of the prison transfer service (G4S) and the WA Department of Corrective Services contributed to Ward's death.

Compensation for his family after his death was delayed, and involved a number of government authorities The delays caused significant loss of confidence in both the government and its capacity to have safe delivery of prison transport in isolated areas of Western Australia. In 2010 the family were compensated.

By 2011, some further responses were occurring, including the Department of Corrective Services pleading guilty to his death in May 2011.

== See also ==
- Aboriginal deaths in custody
- Royal Commission into Aboriginal Deaths in Custody
