= Latitude Hill (Great Victoria Desert) =

Mountain in Western Australia

Coordinates: 26°20′8″S 128°56′40″E

Latitude Hill is a hill in the Great Victoria Desert, Western Australia. It is located at, about five kilometres (3 mi) west of the South Australian border, and 160 kilometres (100 mi) south-south-east of Giles. It is the location of a mining tenement named "Latitude Hill (Musgrave)", owned by Integra Mining.
