= Shire of Ngaanyatjarraku =

Coordinates: 26°08′06″S 126°34′44″E

- Local government area
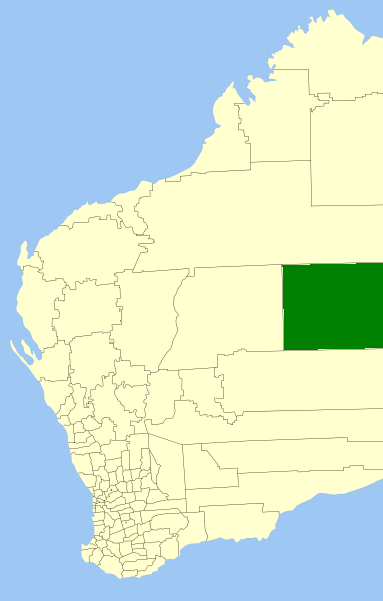
- Location in Western Australia

- Interactive map of Shire of Ngaanyatjarraku
- Country: Australia
- State: Western Australia
- Region: Goldfields-Esperance
- Council seat: Warburton

Government
  - Shire President: Damian McLean
  - State electorate: Kalgoorlie, Kimberley
  - Federal division: O'Connor

Area
  - Total: 160,732.9 km^{2} (62,059.3 sq mi)

Population
  - Total: 1,358 (LGA 2021)
- Website: Shire of Ngaanyatjarraku
LGAs around Shire of Ngaanyatjarraku
East Pilbara	East Pilbara	Northern Territory
Wiluna	Shire of Ngaanyatjarraku	Northern Territory
Laverton	Laverton	South Australia

The Shire of Ngaanyatjarraku is a remote local government area in Western Australia near the Northern Territory/South Australian border. It is 1,542 km (958 mi) from Perth.

It was formed on 1 July 1993 following a report of the Local Government Boundaries Commission in 1992. The Shire of Wiluna was divided with the eastern area becoming the new Shire.

It is a community of interest within the traditional lands of the Ngaanyatjarra people of the Central Desert of Western Australia. The 99-year leases held by the Ngaanyatjarra Land Council on behalf of the traditional owners also form the boundaries of the Shire of Ngaanyatjarraku.

The Shire has 560 km (350 mi) of gravel road and is far from bitumen roads.

The Federal Court of Australia on 29 June 2005 consented to the native title claim over approximately 187,700 km^{2} (72,500 sq mi) (about the size of Syria) of land in the Central Desert Region in the Shires of Laverton and Ngaanyatjarraku.

Ngaanyatjarra is the first language of most residents (65%, see below) with the other language significantly represented being Pitjantjatjara.

== Population ==
The 2021 ABS census indicated that the region's 1,358 residents comprised 48.5% males and 51.5% females, with 84.5% of the population being Indigenous Australians. The Ngaanyatjarraku community has a greater proportion of younger people than the overall Australian population and a lesser proportion of older people, reflected by the median age of 30 years of age compared with 38 Australia-wide.

Some other statistics:

- 84.5% of the population identify as Aboriginal Australian
- 71.4% (970) speak Ngaanyatjarra at home
- 9.9% speak English only at home (cf 72.0% nationwide)

== Communities and localities ==
The Shire of Ngaanyatjarraku covers 159,948 square kilometres (61,756 sq mi) and is the local government authority responsible for the provision of services to the communities. There are 10 small local centres within the Ngaanyatyarra Lands.

The communities and localities of the Shire of Ngaanyatjarraku with population and size figures based on the most recent Australian census:

Locality	Population	Area	Map
Gibson Desert South	4 (SAL 2021)	93,574 km^{2} (36,129 sq mi)	
Irrunytju	133 (SAL 2021)	18.8 km^{2} (7.3 sq mi)	
Kanpa Community	0 (SAL 2021)	7.9 km^{2} (3.1 sq mi)	
Mantamaru Community	124 (SAL 2021)	62.6 km^{2} (24.2 sq mi)	
Ngaanyatjarra-Giles	43 (SAL 2021)	62,276.2 km^{2} (24,045.0 sq mi)	
Papulankutja Community	162 (SAL 2021)	20.8 km^{2} (8.0 sq mi)	
Patjarr Community	39 (SAL 2021)	24.9 km^{2} (9.6 sq mi)	
Tjirrkarli Community	4 (SAL 2021)	800 km^{2} (310 sq mi)	
Tjukurla Community	41 (SAL 2021)	39.1 km^{2} (15.1 sq mi)	
Wanarn Community	117 (SAL 2021)	285.2 km^{2} (110.1 sq mi)	
Warakurna Community	185 (SAL 2021)	51.8 km^{2} (20.0 sq mi)	
Warburton	511 (SAL 2021)	2,794.5 km^{2} (1,079.0 sq mi)	

Kiwirrkurra and Yilka (Cosmo Newbery) lie outside the Lands, but are served by the Shire.

Giles Weather Station is also within the Shire.

== Council statistics ==
- Location: Gibson / Great Victoria Deserts
- Length of Sealed Roads (km): 12.6
- Length of Unsealed Roads (km): 1,444
- Population: 1,335 (2006 Census)
- Educational Institutions
  - Colleges 1
  - Primary & High Schools (K −10) 8

== Ngaanyatjarra Council (Aboriginal Corporation) ==
The associated Ngaanyatjarra Council operates

- Air services (contracted to Missionary Aviation Fellowship (MAF))
- Tertiary education (Ngaanyatjarra Community College, Warburton)
- Communities
- Land Management
- Native Title Representative Body
- Ngaanyatjarra Agencies and Transport Services Inc (NATS)
- Ngaanyatjarra Services (Aboriginal Corporation)
- Roadhouses
  - Tjukayirla
  - Warakurna
  - Warburton
- Service Stations
  - Caltex Alice Springs fuel franchise supplies Caltex fuel and petroleum products to all Ngaanyatjarra communities, workshops and roadhouse facilities.
  - Caltex Roadhouse – Alice Springs

== Heritage-listed places ==
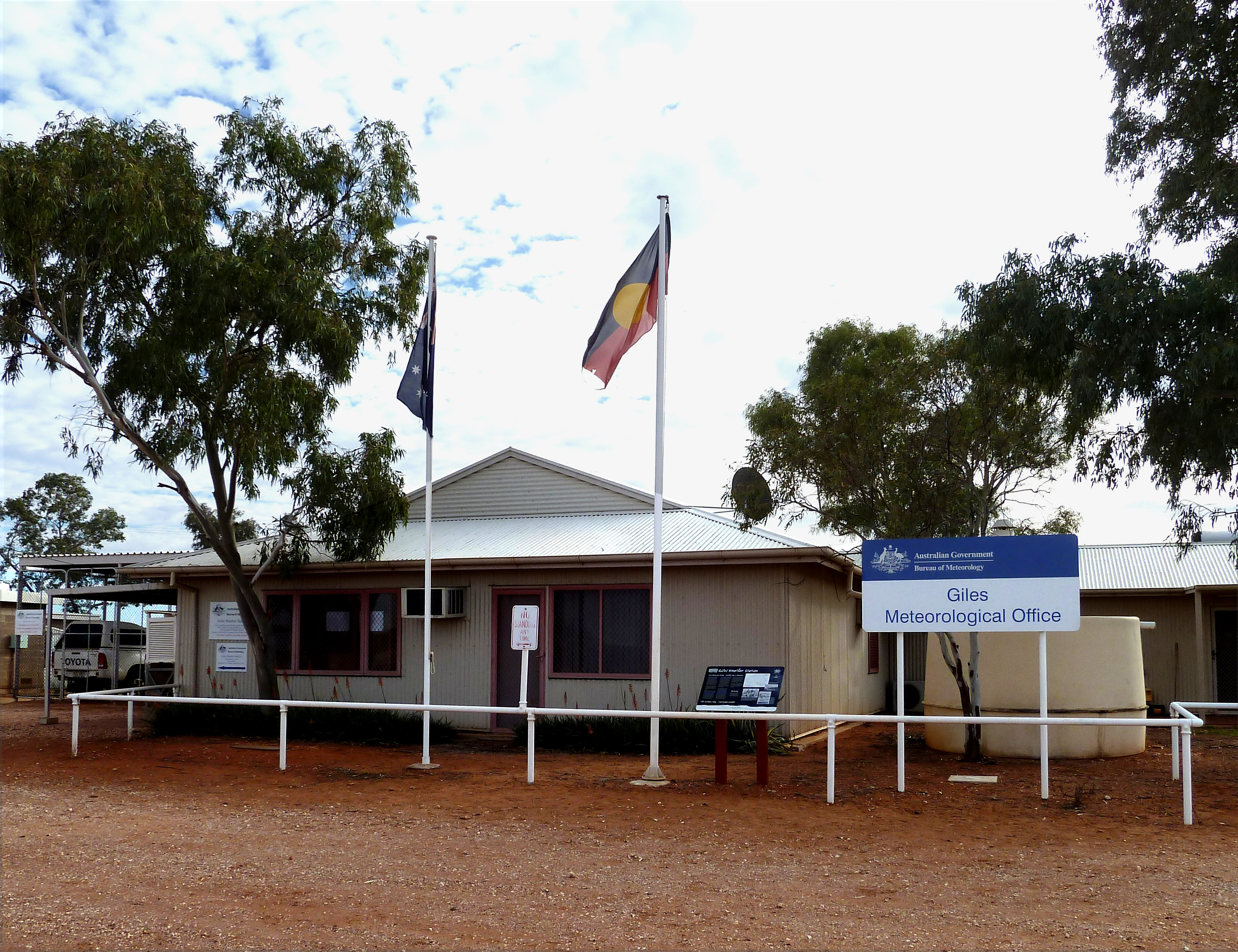
The Giles Weather Station

As of 2023, two places are heritage-listed in the Shire of Ngaanyatjarraku, the Giles Meteorological Station and the Warakurna Multi-Function Police Facility, neither of which are on the State Register of Heritage Places.
