= Wingellina, Western Australia =

Community in Western Australia

Wingellina
- Town
- Interactive map of Wingellina
- Coordinates: 26.07°S 128.93°E
- Country: Australia
- State: Western Australia
- LGA: Shire of Ngaanyatjarraku
- Location: 1,700 km (1,100 mi) north east of Perth; 236 km (147 mi) east of Warburton; 712 km (442 mi) south west of Alice Springs

Government
  - State electorate: North West Central
  - Federal division: O'Connor

Area
  - Total: 18.8 km^{2} (7.3 sq mi)
- Elevation: 676 m (2,218 ft)

Population
  - Total: 133 (SAL 2021)
- Time zone: UTC+8:00 (AWST)
- Postcode: 0872

Wingellina or Irrunytju Community is a small Indigenous Australian community in Western Australia located about 1,700 kilometres (1,056 mi) north east of Perth near the Western Australian-South Australian border in the Goldfields–Esperance region of Western Australia. The local language of Wingellina is Pitjantjatjara.

Surrounded by large granite hills with mulga and mallee country, the community maintains many traditional activities such as hunting and gathering bush tucker as well as making many carved wooden artefacts.

The community is situated 12 kilometres (7.5 mi) southwest of the Surveyor Generals Corner near the border in the Gibson Desert and Great Victoria Desert between the Northern Territory, South Australia and Western Australia.

== History ==
The community was established in the 1980s and was composed mainly of people from the Warburton mission. These people still have spiritual and ancestral ties to many parts of the region. Like other communities in the area, many came from South Australia because of rocket testing at Woomera.

On 1 July 2024, the community switched from Australian Central Standard Time (UTC +9:30) to the regular time zone for Western Australia, Australian Western Standard Time (UTC+08:00).

== Town planning ==
Wingellina Layout Plan No.1 has been prepared in accordance with State Planning Policy 3.2 Aboriginal Settlements. It currently exists in draft format only, having not been endorsed by the community. The map set is viewable at Planning Western Australia's website.

== Native title ==
The community is located within the determined Ngaanyatjarra Lands (Part A) native title claim (WC04/3).
