= Cosmo Newbery =

Community in Western Australia

Cosmo Newberry
- Town
- Interactive map of Cosmo Newberry
- Coordinates: 27.99°S 122.89°E
- Country: Australia
- State: Western Australia
- LGA: Shire of Laverton
- Location: 1,036 km (644 mi) east of Perth; 85 km (53 mi) north east of Laverton
- Established: 1920

Government
  - State electorate: Kalgoorlie
  - Federal division: O'Connor

Area
  - Total: 12,245.8 km^{2} (4,728.1 sq mi)
- Elevation: 507 m (1,663 ft)

Population
  - Total: 62 (ILOC 2021); 143 (SAL 2021)
- Postcode: 6440

Cosmo Newbery (also spelt Cosmo Newberry) is a small Aboriginal community in Western Australia, 1,036 km (644 mi) east of Perth between Laverton and Warburton in the Goldfields-Esperance region of Western Australia. In the 2021 census, Cosmo Newberry had a total population of 143, including 65 Aboriginal and Torres Strait Islander people.

== History ==
The town is named after James Cosmo Newbery, an industrial chemist noted for his work on improving the chlorination method of gold extraction.

The area was originally leased by two returned soldiers as a cattle station, then as a penal colony for a short time, then later became a government ration depot. The town was first settled in 1920. By 1953 the Uniting Church set up a mission but eventually, in 1976, gave the land back to the Aboriginal people living in the area at that time. The town operated for 11 years and was then abandoned for 4 years. In 1989 four families moved back into the town, quickly followed by others. The town now has a health clinic, school, a hall, windmills, communication centre, fuel station and shop.

The town is one of the stops along the Great Central Road that tracks through the Great Victoria Desert and eventually connects with the Gunbarrel Highway; there is a roadhouse operating in the town.

== Native title ==
The community is located within the Yilka and Yilka #2 and Sullivan Family (WCD2017/005) native title determination.

== Governance ==
The community is managed through its incorporated body, Cosmo Newberry Aboriginal Corporation, incorporated under the Aboriginal Councils and Associations Act 1976 on 31 January 1991.

== Town planning ==
Cosmo Newberry Layout Plan No.1 has been prepared in accordance with State Planning Policy 3.2 Aboriginal Settlements. Layout Plan No. 1 was endorsed by the community on 19 May 2000 and by the Western Australian Planning Commission on 21 August 2001.

The Layout Plan map-set and background report can be viewed at Planning Western Australia's web site.
