= Giles Weather Station =

Remote weather station in Western Australia

Giles
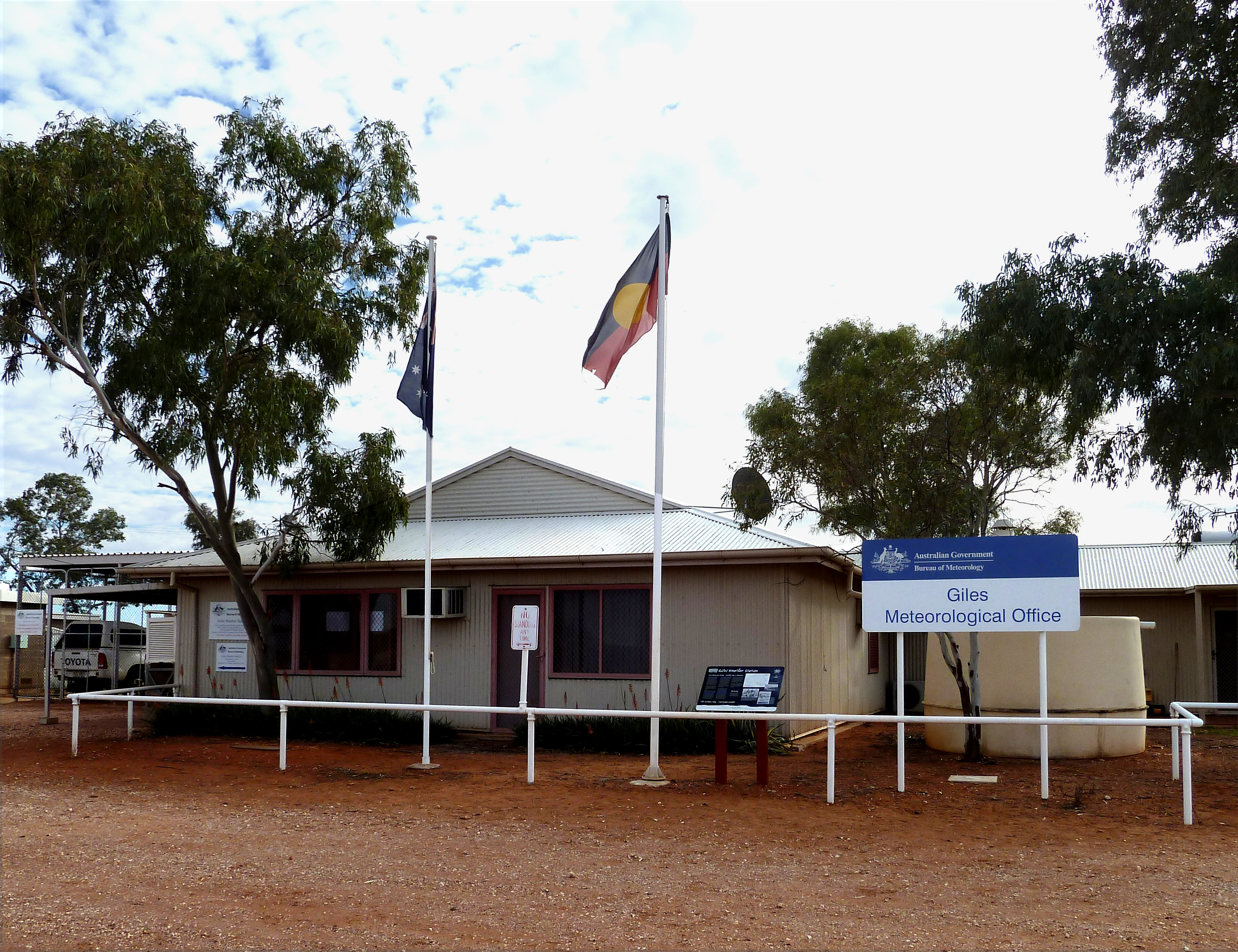
- Giles Weather Station in 2011

- Coordinates: 25°02′0″S 128°18′0″E
- Country: Australia
- State: Western Australia
- LGA: Shire of Ngaanyatjarraku
- Location: 1,746 km (1,085 mi) from Perth; 470 km (290 mi) from Alice Springs
- Established: 1956

Government
  - State electorate: North West Central
  - Federal division: O'Connor
- Elevation: 592 m (1,942 ft)

Population
  - Total: 3 (2018)
- Time zone: UTC+8 (AWST – official; +9:30 ACST used in weather reports)
  - Summer (DST): UTC+8 (AWST – official; +10:30 ACDT used in weather reports)
- Postcode: 0872 (as Ngaanyatjarra-Giles delivery area)
- Mean max temp: 29.5 °C (85.1 °F)
- Mean min temp: 15.9 °C (60.6 °F)
- Annual rainfall: 290.9 mm (11.45 in)

Giles Weather Station (also referred to as Giles Meteorological Office or Giles) is located in the locality of Warakurna, Western Australia near the Northern Territory border, about 750 kilometres (470 mi) west-south-west of Alice Springs and 330 kilometres (210 mi) west of Uluru. It is the only staffed regional weather station in mainland Australia, having previously been the only one within an area of about 2,500,000 square kilometres (970,000 sq mi) by 2008, and is situated mid-continent and near the core of the subtropical jetstream. This means it plays an important role as a weather and climate observatory for the country, particularly eastern and southeastern Australia, and particularly for rainfall predictions. The station is on the Great Central Road in the locality of Warakurna and the nearest township is the Warakurna Aboriginal settlement (population 180), 5 kilometres (3 mi) North. Giles is within the Shire of Ngaanyatjarraku and is in the foothills of the Rawlinson Ranges.

== Operation and facilities ==
A staff of three operates the remote station on four-monthly tours. The Ngaanyatjarra lands, of which this station is a part, previously used both Australian Western Standard Time (UTC+8:00) and Australian Central Standard Time (UTC+09:30) with Warakurna using the latter time zone, but On 1 July 2024, they switched to exclusively use Australian Western standard time (AWST). However, as of 2026, the station reports its weather using Australian Central Standard Time in line with South Australia, including daylight saving. Giles Airport, a 1,600-metre (5,200 ft) airstrip services the station and the Warakurna community.

Tourists are invited to watch the daily release of the weather balloon at 7AM Australian Western Standard Time to see the release process and learn more about their work, before the balloon is launched fifteen minutes later. Additionally there is a museum that visitors can browse, a remnant of the Blue Streak Rocket and Len Beadell's grader on display.

== History ==
Giles is named after English explorer Ernest Giles, the first European to travel through the area in 1874.

Surveyor and roadbuilder Len Beadell, who worked for the Weapons Research Establishment (now known as the Defence Science and Technology Group), selected the site for a meteorological station in December 1955. It was needed to forecast weather conditions suitable for nuclear weapons testing at Emu Field and Maralinga. The location was strongly opposed by Walter MacDougall since it lay on tribal land. Beadell surveyed and built Giles Airport, and chose the name Giles during construction of the Gunbarrel Highway which links Carnegie Station and Giles. Beadell's grader, which is estimated to have travelled over 30,000 kilometres (19,000 miles) in the course of making the roads, was retired in 1963 and is preserved on display at Giles.

Later, the weather station provided support for rocket testing programs at Woomera, as Giles was close to the centre-line of fire from the launch site. Wreckage from the first Blue Streak missile, launched from Woomera on 5 June 1964, is on display at the station.

Docker River, 100 kilometres (62 miles) north-east and just across the state border in the Northern Territory, was established by the government as an aboriginal settlement for local people in the 1960s. Overcrowding there and at Warburton created a need for a new community which became Warakurna in the mid-1970s.

In 1972, control of the station was transferred from the Department of Defence to the Bureau of Meteorology.

A Landline story in 2018 stated that Giles would soon become the last mainland regional weather station to be permanently staffed, with all the others being automated. This was set to be the case by the end of 2023.

== Climate ==
Giles Weather Station has a hot desert climate (Köppen: BWh) with very hot summers with irregular rainfall and mild, dry winters. Giles has high insolation, with 194.3 clear days and 3491.4 sunshine hours annually. Rainfall is highly variable; recorded annual values have ranged from 38.0 millimetres (1.50 in) in 1961 to 843.4 millimetres (33.20 in) in 2001. The periodic southward movement of the monsoon trough and ex-tropical cyclones cause heavy rain events in the wetter months from November to March. Dry spells often occur, particularly in winter; the longest period without rain was 156 days from 18 April to 20 September 1961.

Climate data for Giles Meteorological Office (25°02'S, 128°18'E, 598 m AMSL) (1956–present and extremes)
Month	Jan	Feb	Mar	Apr	May	Jun	Jul	Aug	Sep	Oct	Nov	Dec	Year
Record high °C (°F)	45.7 (114.3)	44.4 (111.9)	44.6 (112.3)	38.9 (102.0)	33.9 (93.0)	29.9 (85.8)	30.8 (87.4)	36.1 (97.0)	38.2 (100.8)	41.6 (106.9)	43.9 (111.0)	46.8 (116.2)	46.8 (116.2)
Mean daily maximum °C (°F)	37.3 (99.1)	36.2 (97.2)	34.0 (93.2)	29.5 (85.1)	23.8 (74.8)	20.3 (68.5)	20.3 (68.5)	23.0 (73.4)	27.7 (81.9)	32.0 (89.6)	34.4 (93.9)	36.0 (96.8)	29.5 (85.2)
Mean daily minimum °C (°F)	23.6 (74.5)	22.8 (73.0)	20.7 (69.3)	16.4 (61.5)	11.3 (52.3)	8.0 (46.4)	6.9 (44.4)	8.8 (47.8)	13.1 (55.6)	17.3 (63.1)	20.0 (68.0)	22.0 (71.6)	15.9 (60.6)
Record low °C (°F)	11.7 (53.1)	9.8 (49.6)	8.9 (48.0)	5.4 (41.7)	1.8 (35.2)	−1.6 (29.1)	−2.5 (27.5)	−1.4 (29.5)	2.0 (35.6)	4.2 (39.6)	7.0 (44.6)	9.5 (49.1)	−2.5 (27.5)
Average precipitation mm (inches)	34.8 (1.37)	43.2 (1.70)	34.6 (1.36)	17.4 (0.69)	19.9 (0.78)	18.4 (0.72)	10.0 (0.39)	9.5 (0.37)	11.0 (0.43)	15.9 (0.63)	29.3 (1.15)	46.8 (1.84)	290.9 (11.45)
Average precipitation days (≥ 1.0 mm)	4.1	3.8	3.1	1.9	2.3	2.0	1.4	1.2	1.6	2.2	3.4	4.7	31.8
Average afternoon relative humidity (%)	21	25	24	24	30	31	29	22	17	16	18	23	23
Average dew point °C (°F)	7.0 (44.6)	8.3 (46.9)	6.1 (43.0)	3.8 (38.8)	2.4 (36.3)	0.8 (33.4)	−1.3 (29.7)	−2.8 (27.0)	−2.7 (27.1)	−1.2 (29.8)	2.3 (36.1)	5.9 (42.6)	2.4 (36.3)
Mean monthly sunshine hours	313.1	271.2	288.3	273.0	263.5	249.0	279.0	306.9	306.0	325.5	309.0	306.9	3,491.4
Mean daily sunshine hours	10.1	9.6	9.3	9.1	8.5	8.3	9.0	9.9	10.2	10.5	10.3	9.9	9.6
Source: Bureau of Meteorology
