= Kaltukatjara =

Community in the Northern Territory, Australia

Kaltukatjara (Docker River) Northern Territory
- Coordinates: 24°52′27″S 129°05′01″E
- Population: 355 (2006 census)
- Established: 1968
- Postcode(s): 0872
- Location: 1,390 km (864 mi) S of Darwin; 495 km (308 mi) by air southwest of Alice Springs; 670 km (416 mi) by road southwest of Alice Springs; 7 km (4 mi) east of Western Australian border
- LGA(s): MacDonnell Region
- Territory electorate(s): Namatjira
- Federal division(s): Lingiari
Mean max temp	Mean min temp	Annual rainfall
37.2 °C; 99 °F	6.8 °C; 44 °F	284.2 mm 11.2 in

Kaltukatjara, also known as Docker River, is a remote Indigenous Australian community in the Northern Territory of Australia. It is southwest of Alice Springs, west of the Stuart Highway, near the Western Australia and Northern Territory border. The township is on a wadi called the Docker Creek on the north side of the west end of the Petermann Ranges in the southwest corner of the Northern Territory of Australia.

At the 2006 census, Kaltukatjara had a population of 355.

== History ==
A permanent settlement at "Docker River" was established in 1968 to relieve pressure on the Warburton settlement and provide an opportunity for Aboriginal people to live closer to their homelands.

PY Media states that Kaltukatjara acquired its European name "Docker River" from explorer Ernest Giles, as well as other history, as follows:

The site that is now Kaltukatjara was originally named Docker River by Ernest Giles during his expedition of 1872.

Pastors Duguid and Strehlow surveyed the area in the 1930s with a view to establishing a settlement for the people in the area. It was decided not to proceed with this at that time. During the 30s and 40s Luther(a)n missionaries told the Pitjantjatjara people of the Kaltukatjara area to go to Areyonga (then an outstation of Hermannsburg mission) where they would be supplied with food and clothing. Although many Anangu moved in of their own free will, some stayed in the Petermanns.

In the 1960s Areyonga Anangu strongly desired to move back to the area around Docker River and with government assistance a permanent settlement was established there in 1967-8. Over 300 Anangu moved to establish the new settlement.

By the proclamation of the Aboriginal Lands Rights (N.T.) Act, 1976, Anangu in the region gained freehold title to these traditional lands an area of 44,970 square kilometres.

The settlement was funded as an outstation during the 1980s.

In 2009, feral camels had become a major problem for local residents. Around 6,000 animals entered the town searching for water. Preparations for an emergency cull of using a sharpshooter were underway.

== Geography ==
Kaltukatjara lies on the Tjukaruru Road which becomes the Great Central Road when it crosses into Western Australia 7 kilometres to the west.

== Climate ==
Based upon the climate records of the nearest weather station at Giles across the border to the west in Western Australia, Kaltukatjara experiences summer maximum temperatures of an average of 37.2 degrees Celsius in January and a winter maximum average temperature of 19.9 degrees Celsius in July. Overnight lows range from a mean minimum temperature of 23.5 degrees in January to 6.8 degrees in June.

Annual rainfall averages 284.2 millimetres.

== Demographics ==
The 2001 ABS Census recorded that there were 297 people living in the community, an increase of 20 on the 277 people disclosed in the 1997 Census.

The people speak Pitjantjatjara and Ngaatjatjarra, and largely identify as Anangu.

The 2001 Census revealed that Kaltukatjara was second only to its northern neighbour Kintore in the having the highest proportion of its population engaged in health and community services (26.3%).

== Governance ==
Before 2008-07-01, Kaltukatjara was served by the Kaltukatjara Community Council, composed of twelve residents who are elected annually. The Council served as the local government and qualified as a "local government area". On 2008-07-01, it became part of the MacDonnell Region.

== Facilities ==
Water for the Kaltukatjara supply system is obtained from three bores, one located near the ground tanks and one approximately 1.5 km west of the community. There are 3 ground tanks and 1 raised tank in the community. Water quality is of a high standard with chlorine needed only on rare occasions.

Kaltukatjara has a sewerage system and some houses are fitted with their own septic tanks.

Electricity is provided by three diesel power generators.

Roads within the township are sealed, but the Petermann Road (the main road to the community) is unsealed.

As of 2022 Kaltukatjara has an airstrip, general store (with petrol supplies), Tjarlirli Art centre and gallery, recreation hall, aged care facility, health centre, school, two public telephones, an Australian Rules football oval and basketball court. By 2017 the airstrip had been paved, along with the access road from town.

There is a Lutheran church with a resident pastor, overseen by the Lutheran Church's Finke River Mission board.
