= Rawlinson Ranges =

Mountain range in Western Australia

Coordinates: 24°50′S 127°50′E

Purli Yurliya or Rawlinson Ranges is a mountain range in the far east of central Western Australia, to the west of the Petermann Ranges, with which it is commonly associated. Both features were given their European names by Ernest Giles, the first European explorer to visit the area.

The range runs roughly east from Lake Christopher for approximately 40 kilometres (25 mi). The Giles Weather Station is located a few kilometres further east.

The area has been considered a possible site of the fabled Lasseter's Reef.
