= Laverton, Western Australia =

Laverton
- Town
- Interactive map of Laverton
- Coordinates: 28°37′40″S 122°24′11″E
- Country: Australia
- State: Western Australia
- LGA: Shire of Laverton
- Location: 957 km (595 mi) NNE of Perth; 124 km (77 mi) ENE of Leonora
- Established: 1898

Government
  - State electorate: Kalgoorlie
  - Federal division: O'Connor

Area
  - Total: 11,482.3 km^{2} (4,433.3 sq mi)
- Elevation: 461 m (1,512 ft)

Population
  - Total: 407 (UCL 2021)
- Postcode: 6440
- Mean max temp: 27.3 °C (81.1 °F)
- Mean min temp: 13.2 °C (55.8 °F)
- Annual rainfall: 232.5 mm (9.15 in)

Laverton, originally known as British Flag, is a town in the Goldfields region of Western Australia, and the centre of administration for the Shire of Laverton. The town of Laverton is located at the western edge of the Great Victoria Desert, 957 kilometres (595 mi) north-northeast of the state capital, Perth, and 124 kilometres (77 mi) east-northeast of the town of Leonora, with an elevation of 461 metres (1,512 ft).

About 20% of the population is of Aboriginal descent. The area is semi-arid, with a mean annual rainfall of 233 millimetres (9.2 in). It is also quite warm, with mean daily maximum temperatures ranging from 17 °C (62 °F) in July to 36 °C (97 °F) in January.

Laverton is the westernmost town on the Outback Way – a proposed highway which goes through the Northern Territory to Winton in outback Queensland.

== History ==
A number of early explorers travelled over the Laverton area, including John Forrest, David Carnegie and Frank Hann. Gold was discovered in the British Flag area in 1896 and many prospectors and miners moved into the area. Among them was Dr Charles W. Laver, who became an enthusiastic supporter and promoter of the region.

One of the most successful mines was Craiggiemore, and by 1897 a residential and business area known as British Flag had sprung up on the west side of the mine. In March 1898 a townsite was approved as Laverton, in honour of Laver. In 1899, the residents sought to have a townsite surveyed, but by then the original Craiggiemore location had become unsuitable, so a new site was chosen about 3 kilometres (1.9 mi) north of the original lots. The new site was surveyed in July 1899 and the town of Laverton gazetted in July 1900.

Laverton was the terminus of a branch line of the Kalgoorlie to Leonora railway line, with the junction at Malcolm.

By the late 1960s, Laverton was in decline, mainly because of the very low price of gold. In 1968 a Poseidon prospector Ken Shirley discovered nickel-bearing rocks at Windarra, 24 kilometres (15 mi) northwest of Laverton. In 1969 Poseidon began drilling Windarra. In September rumours of a nickel strike prompted the Poseidon bubble. The deposit was developed by Western Mining and its partners into the Windarra Nickel Project, which mined and processed nickel ore from 1974 to 1991.

== Modern industry ==
Gold mines in the Leonora - Laverton region

Laverton is primarily a mining area. There are two major operating gold mines in the district: the Wallaby Mine near Granny Smith, owned and operated by Gold Fields, and the Sunrise Dam Gold Mine, owned and operated by AngloGold Ashanti. Both open pit and underground mining is conducted at these mines. The Murrin Murrin laterite nickel project is located 55 kilometres (34 mi) to the west, midway between Laverton and Leonora. The area has a long history of pastoralism with sheep, cattle and goats, and a substantial area of land is used in this way.

== Demographics ==
According to census results from the Australian Bureau of Statistics, the population of the Laverton urban centre fell 23%, from 439 to 340 in the 15 years from 2001 to 2016. Over this same period, the population of Indigenous Australians decreased from 37.6% (165 people) to 20.8% (71 people) of the town.

== Climate ==
Laverton has a borderline hot arid climate (Köppen BWh)/hot semi-arid climate (BSh), with sweltering summers and pleasant winters. Rainfall is low throughout the year, typically coming from strong southern frontal systems in early winter or remnant tropical cyclones from the Pilbara in late summer. Since records started in 1899, the wettest calendar year has been 2000 with 525.6 millimetres or 20.69 inches, and the driest 1928 with 65.6 millimetres or 2.58 inches. The wettest month has been February 1995 with 233.6 millimetres or 9.20 inches, and the wettest day 17 February 2011 with 120.2 millimetres or 4.73 inches.

Climate data for Laverton (1991-2020; rainfall from BOM 012046; temperatures from Laverton Aero [012305])
Month	Jan	Feb	Mar	Apr	May	Jun	Jul	Aug	Sep	Oct	Nov	Dec	Year
Record high °C (°F)	47.6 (117.7)	45.6 (114.1)	43.1 (109.6)	39.6 (103.3)	35.1 (95.2)	27.8 (82.0)	29.7 (85.5)	33.6 (92.5)	36.7 (98.1)	41.3 (106.3)	44.7 (112.5)	45.5 (113.9)	47.6 (117.7)
Mean daily maximum °C (°F)	35.6 (96.1)	34.0 (93.2)	30.7 (87.3)	27.0 (80.6)	22.3 (72.1)	18.6 (65.5)	18.6 (65.5)	20.9 (69.6)	24.8 (76.6)	28.9 (84.0)	31.6 (88.9)	34.0 (93.2)	27.2 (81.0)
Mean daily minimum °C (°F)	21.6 (70.9)	20.8 (69.4)	18.4 (65.1)	15.1 (59.2)	10.3 (50.5)	7.0 (44.6)	5.9 (42.6)	7.3 (45.1)	10.6 (51.1)	14.5 (58.1)	17.4 (63.3)	19.9 (67.8)	14.1 (57.4)
Record low °C (°F)	12.0 (53.6)	12.3 (54.1)	8.0 (46.4)	4.3 (39.7)	0.3 (32.5)	−2 (28)	−3.3 (26.1)	−1.5 (29.3)	1.3 (34.3)	4.2 (39.6)	5.6 (42.1)	10.9 (51.6)	−3.3 (26.1)
Average rainfall mm (inches)	41.6 (1.64)	52.4 (2.06)	37.8 (1.49)	23.2 (0.91)	16.6 (0.65)	19.2 (0.76)	16.0 (0.63)	11.5 (0.45)	7.9 (0.31)	15.3 (0.60)	16.7 (0.66)	26.6 (1.05)	285.0 (11.22)
Average rainy days (≥ 1 mm)	3.7	4.2	4.0	3.5	2.9	3.4	3.1	2.2	1.8	2.3	3.2	3.6	37.9
Source 1: Australian Bureau of Meteorology
Source 2: Australian Bureau of Meteorology

== See also ==
- Laverton Airport
