= Warburton, Western Australia =

Community in Western Australia

Warburton
- Town
- Interactive map of Warburton
- Coordinates: 26°08′00″S 126°35′00″E
- Country: Australia
- State: Western Australia
- LGA: Shire of Ngaanyatjarraku
- Location: 288 km (179 mi) west of Kaltukatjara (Docker River); 560 km (350 mi) northeast of Laverton; 750 km (470 mi) northeast of Kalgoorlie; 1,050 km (650 mi) southwest of Alice Springs; 1,500 km (930 mi) east-northeast of Perth
- Established: 1933

Government
  - State electorate: North West Central
  - Federal division: O'Connor

Area
  - Total: 2,794.5 km^{2} (1,079.0 sq mi)
- Elevation: 459 m (1,506 ft)

Population
  - Total: 511 (SAL 2021)
- Postcode: 6431
- Mean max temp: 30.0 °C (86.0 °F)
- Mean min temp: 15.0 °C (59.0 °F)
- Annual rainfall: 242.5 mm (9.55 in)

Warburton, Warburton Ranges or Milyirrtjarra (in the Ngaanyatjarra dialect) is an Aboriginal Australian community in Western Australia, just to the south of the Gibson Desert and located on the Great Central Road (part of the Outback Way) and Gunbarrel Highway. At the 2016 census, Warburton had a population of 576.

== History ==
The settlement was established as an Aboriginal mission under the auspices of the UAM (United Aborigines Mission) in 1934 by Will Wade, his wife and his children. It was named after explorer Peter Warburton, the first European to cross the Great Sandy Desert.

The Ngaanyatjarra people of the Western Desert cultural bloc were nomadic people, but with the arrival of missionaries in 1933, they were drawn to the mission. By 1954, around 500 to 700 Aboriginal people lived at the mission. There was a school where they were taught in English, and traditional culture discouraged. Domestic skills were taught to women and girls, and the men collected dingo or became shearers or builders.

More people were attracted to work at the copper mine which opened nearby, and by the 1970s there were few Aboriginal people living as nomads in the bush. In 1973, the UAM handed control of the settlement to the Aboriginal people represented by the Ngaanyatjarra Council, while the Aboriginal Affairs Planning Authority of the Government of Western Australia became responsible for economic development.

The town was hit by a flash flood in February 2011. Water levels in some parts of town reached as high as 2 metres (7 ft) resulting in 60 homes being evacuated. Water flowed through 15 homes to a height of 30 centimetres (12 in) and two people had to be rescued from a stranded four-wheel drive vehicle that had water reach window level.

== Warburton Ranges controversy ==
In 1957, the "Warburton Ranges controversy" or "Warburton Ranges crisis" arose, after it was reported in 1956 that at least 40 Aboriginal people had been discovered to be ill and malnourished in the Central Desert.

The matter came into public consciousness after, in partnership with the British Government, the Commonwealth government had started testing nuclear weapons in the desert, and the Government of Western Australia raised concerns about the Western desert people living nomadically in the area. The response from the Commonwealth was that Aboriginal welfare was a state government matter. Activists protested and many concerned members of the public wrote letters to the Prime Minister of Australia, Sir Robert Menzies, as well as their local MPs. An enquiry into the state of the Aboriginal people by a select committee followed, with their report tabled in the Western Australian Parliament in December 1956, officially called the Report of the Select Committee appointed to Enquire into Native Welfare Conditions in the Laverton-Warburton Range Area (or the Grayden Report, after chairman William Grayden). It reported that many of the Wongi people (referring to the Wangkatha, a group of eight Aboriginal peoples) of the Warburton Ranges region suffered from malnutrition, blindness, disease, burns and other injuries, and that abortions and infanticide were common. Mainstream newspapers brought the matter to public attention after the Communist Party of Australia's newspaper Tribune published a damning assessment of the report, and letters to the editors flooded in.

In response to the publicity, three separate groups visited the area:

- a group of journalists led by Rupert Murdoch, then editor of The News (Adelaide), to an area up to the Rawlinson Ranges in the north;
- a group of Western Australian Department of Health officials, who covered the ground as far as the Laverton area in the west; and
- a group of anthropologists, including Ronald and Catherine Berndt, who travelled southwards as far as the transcontinental railway.

Murdoch rejected the findings outright, saying in an article "These fine native people have never enjoyed better conditions", accompanied by a photograph of a well-fed, happy family group – failing to mention that the photo was four years old. The anthropologists said that the report had been exaggerated, and that malnutrition was not as widespread as it claimed, but argued that the status of Aboriginal reserves need examination. Being the Aboriginal people's "most tangible asset", mineral rights should not be granted in their land by the government.

In response to Murdoch's repudiation of the report, Grayden set out to return to the area in February 1957, this time with Pastor Doug Nicholls and armed with a movie camera. The resulting film, titled Manslaughter, was screened in Adelaide, Perth, Sydney, and in country towns, shocking audiences with its depiction of malnourished children. More White Australians wrote to the Prime Minister and rejected the federal government's response and Murdoch's report, and the Save the Aborigines Committee was established in Melbourne (a precursor to the Victorian Aborigines Advancement League. The incident proved a spur to a range of activism, including plans by the Anti-Slavery and Aborigines' Protection Society, based in London, in conjunction with the Victorian Council for Aboriginal Rights (CAR) and the Aboriginal-Australian Fellowship in New South Wales, in collaboration with Jessie Street, a leading Australian suffragette. Anna Froland of the Women’s International League for Peace and Freedom's Melbourne branch, was a leading figure in keeping the issue alive, arguing that both federate and state governments were responsible for the welfare of the country's Aboriginal peoples.

Soon a national movement grew, promoted by Shirley Andrews, the Secretary of the Victorian Council for Aboriginal Rights, Charles Duguid, the President of the Aborigines' Advancement League of South Australia, and Stan Davey, Secretary of the Victorian Aborigines Advancement League. The national movement was created in Adelaide in February 1958, when activists from all over Australia formed the Federal Council for Aboriginal Advancement (now FCAATSI).

== Geography ==
Warburton is the centre of a very large and extremely isolated Aboriginal reserve, Ngaanyatjarra, which stretches east to the Northern Territory border. Beyond there the first major settlement is Yulara, near Uluru. The closest town is Laverton 560 kilometres (350 mi) south west along the Great Central Road.

Warburton is situated on the Elder Creek.

The area around Warburton continues to be of interest for mining exploration, predominantly for copper and nickel, but also uranium and gold.

== Town planning and demographics ==
Warburton Layout Plan No.1 was prepared in accordance with State Planning Policy 3.2 Aboriginal Communities, and was endorsed by the community on 9 December 2003 and the Western Australian Planning Commission on 29 June 2004.

The demographics of the population are likely matched by the overall data indicated for the Shire of Ngaanyatjarraku 2016 Census. The 2016 Census indicated a population of 576 residents, 84.9% of whom were Indigenous Australians.

== Arts and culture ==
The Indigenous people of Warburton belong to the Western Desert cultural bloc. It is also in the area of the Papunya Tula art movement, which was founded in 1971–72 and whose name derives from derives from Papunya, a settlement located about 240 km (150 mi) north-west of Alice Springs in the Northern Territory. Artworks by Papunya Tula artists are represented in many major art galleries, museums, institutions and private collections both in Australia and around the world. The main language spoken is Ngaanyatjarra. According to the 2006 census, English was the only language spoken at home by 9.2% of Indigenous persons usually resident in Warburton while Ngaanyatjarra (78.5%) and Wangkatha (2.3%) were the only two other Indigenous languages spoken.

=== Wilurarra Creative Centre ===
Wilurarra Creative Centre is a community facility which is activated by a year-round program, for people aged between 17 and 30 years. Within Wilurarra Creative's Centre people work on a range of different practices including music, fashion performance, land and cultural practice, digital media, print media and art. Wilurarra Creative engages with the demand from Warburton's young people for the activities that link the reality of contemporary cultural context within which Ngaanyatjarra life operates.

The centre was built in 1994, the first dedicated music recording studio in the Ngaanyatjarra region, and its programs have been across various art and cultural forms, subject matter and involving a range of community people. In 2007, a video produced by Warburton Youth Artists Nerida Lane and Prudence Andy won the prestigious Heywire Award. The Wilurarra Creative program is based on empowerment, equality and collaboration. Wilurarra also utilises the democratising power of YouTube. The Studio and its programs are currently funded by the Federal Attorney General's Department and occur in the town of Warburton on the Ngaanyatjarra Lands.

=== Tjulyuru Cultural and Civic Centre ===
The Tjulyuru Cultural and Civic Centre houses the Tjulyuru Regional Arts Gallery, which is reputed to be the largest collection of community-controlled Aboriginal Australian art in the world, also known as the Warburton Collection. The gallery exhibits Aboriginal arts and crafts from Warakurna Artists, Papalunkutja Artists, Kayili Artists, Tjanpi Weavers and Wilurarra Creative. The Warburton Arts Project was commenced in 1990 to preserve local tradition and culture, with the new cultural centre opening in October 2000. It includes a performing arts venue, and is a regional centre for Ngaanyatjarra culture.

=== Rainbow cave ===
The rock art site known as the "Rainbow cave" has been painted layer upon layer over the years, using imagery which is used to teach children. Stewart Davies and Tommy Simms are two of the artists who painted the cave in the early 2000s.

== Facilities ==
Warburton is in the Shire of Ngaanyatjarraku. Information on travel and tourism in the area can be found on their website. The town has an air strip, one community store, health clinic, school, youth drop-in centre, open air swimming pool, sports field, gallery and coffee shop (open Sunday mornings), and roadhouse. The town is serviced by Australia Post and the Flying Doctor Service.

A haemodialysis unit opened in the community in 2013. Patients can return to Warburton permanently or for extended visits and be treated. The service is run by Purple House in partnership with the Ngaanyatjarra Health Service.

Ngaanyatjarra Community College was opened in August 1996 to provide a range of adult education options for the community. The only current service offered at the college is a telecentre.

Warburton is a "dry" community where the use and import of alcohol is prohibited under local by-laws.

Tourists and visitors need a permit from the Ngaanyatjarra Council to enter the town and use any of the highways in the area.

== Climate ==
Warburton has a hot desert climate (BWh) with long, hot summers and short, warm winters. January is the hottest month of the year, with a mean maximum temperature of 38.0 °C (100.4 °F) and a mean minimum of 23.3 °C (73.9 °F). July is the coolest month with a mean maximum temperature of 20.9 °C (69.6 °F) and a mean minimum temperature of 5.8 °C (42.4 °F).

Average rainfall is 242.5 millimetres (9.55 in), with December tending to be the wettest month and September the driest. Warburton is therefore more affected by the tropical rain systems from the north of Australia rather than the rain-bearing cold fronts arriving from Antarctica towards the south of Australia.

Climate data for Warburton Airfield
Month	Jan	Feb	Mar	Apr	May	Jun	Jul	Aug	Sep	Oct	Nov	Dec	Year
Record high °C (°F)	47.7 (117.9)	46.3 (115.3)	44.8 (112.6)	40.1 (104.2)	35.7 (96.3)	30.0 (86.0)	31.0 (87.8)	37.8 (100.0)	40.0 (104.0)	43.9 (111.0)	44.4 (111.9)	47.4 (117.3)	47.7 (117.9)
Mean daily maximum °C (°F)	38.0 (100.4)	36.8 (98.2)	34.4 (93.9)	29.6 (85.3)	24.4 (75.9)	20.8 (69.4)	20.9 (69.6)	23.6 (74.5)	28.2 (82.8)	32.1 (89.8)	34.5 (94.1)	36.8 (98.2)	30.0 (86.0)
Mean daily minimum °C (°F)	23.3 (73.9)	22.5 (72.5)	20.4 (68.7)	15.5 (59.9)	10.5 (50.9)	6.7 (44.1)	5.8 (42.4)	7.5 (45.5)	11.6 (52.9)	16.1 (61.0)	19.0 (66.2)	21.7 (71.1)	15.0 (59.0)
Record low °C (°F)	13.9 (57.0)	13.0 (55.4)	9.0 (48.2)	3.3 (37.9)	0.0 (32.0)	−1.8 (28.8)	−5.0 (23.0)	−3.4 (25.9)	0.0 (32.0)	2.2 (36.0)	6.9 (44.4)	9.1 (48.4)	−5.0 (23.0)
Average rainfall mm (inches)	31.0 (1.22)	32.6 (1.28)	30.0 (1.18)	17.4 (0.69)	14.6 (0.57)	17.7 (0.70)	11.3 (0.44)	8.3 (0.33)	5.5 (0.22)	15.6 (0.61)	24.4 (0.96)	33.1 (1.30)	241.5 (9.5)
Average rainy days (≥ 0.2mm)	4.4	4.0	4.0	3.1	3.4	3.5	2.9	1.9	1.6	3.0	4.3	5.2	41.3
Source: Bureau of Meteorology

== See also ==
- Mr Ward
