= Beadell =

Beadell is a surname. Notable people with the surname include:

- Len Beadell (1923–1995), Australian surveyor and road builder
- Robert Beadell (1925–1994), American classical composer

== See also ==
- 3161 Beadell, a main-belt asteroid
- Anne Beadell Highway, an unsealed track of Western Australia
- Mount Beadell, a mountain of Western Australia
