= Connolly Basin crater =

Impact crater in Western Australia

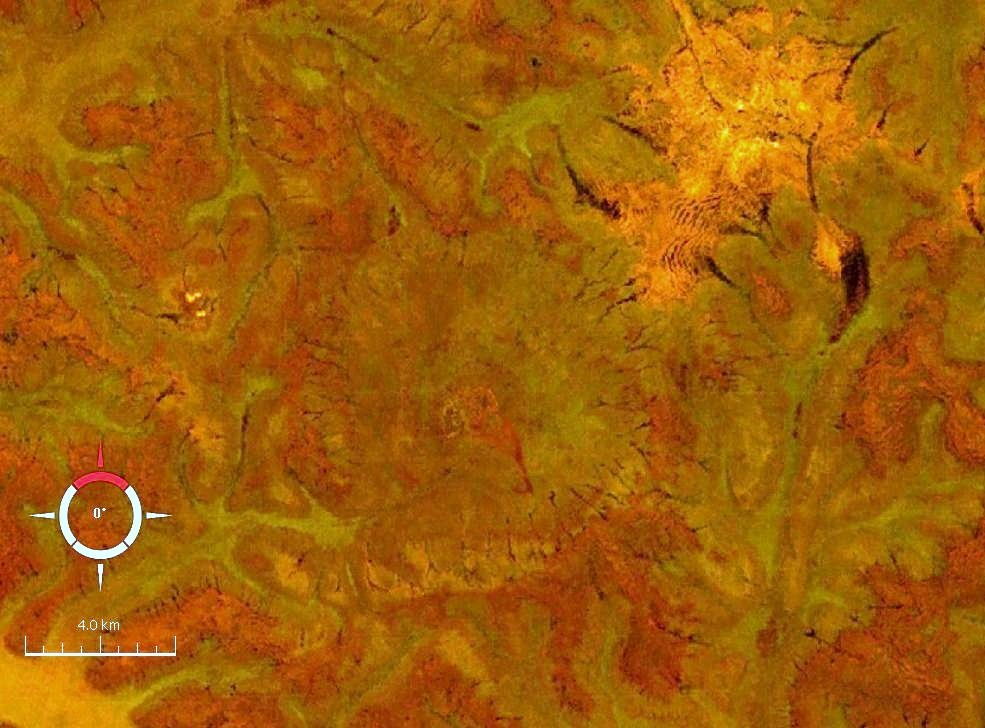
- Landsat image of the Connolly Basin crater (circular feature in centre); screen capture from NASA World Wind

- Location within Western Australia
- Location: Gibson Desert, Western Australia, Australia; 23°32.3′S 124°45.4′E

Impact crater structure
- Confidence: Confirmed
- Diameter: 9 km (5.6 mi)
- Depth: 25–30 m (82–98 ft)
- Age: <60 Ma; Paleocene
- Exposed: Yes
- Drilled: No
- Access: Talawana Track

Connolly Basin is a 9 km-diameter impact crater located in the Gibson Desert of central Western Australia. It lies adjacent to the Talawana Track 45 km west of the junction (Windy Corner) with the Gary Highway, but is difficult to access due to the remoteness of the area. It was originally thought to be a diapir (salt dome); an impact origin was first proposed in 1985.^{,}

== Description ==
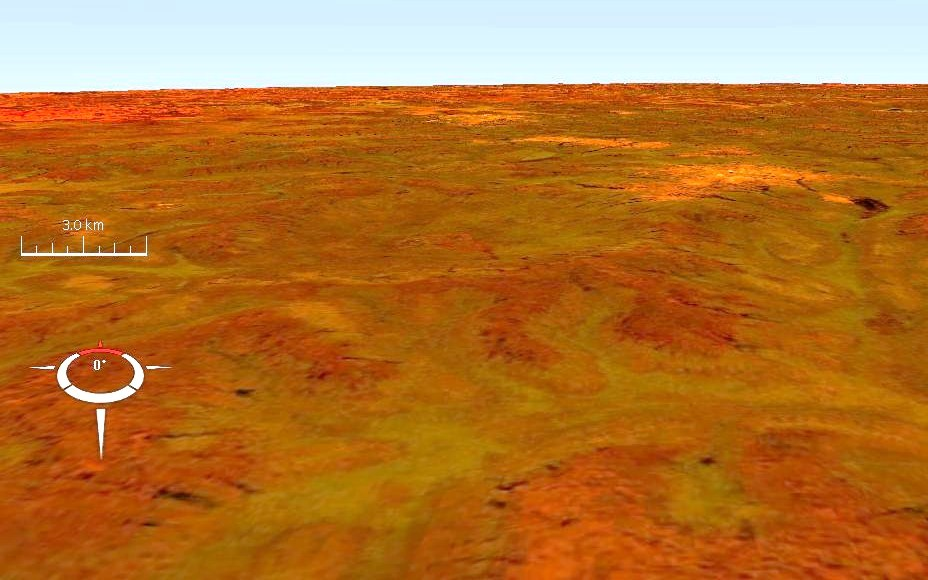
Oblique Landsat image draped over digital elevation data (x10 vertical exaggeration), Connolly Basin crater (circular depression in centre); screen capture from NASA World Wind

The depression has a topographic rim 25–30 m high, while the centre displays a slight circular rise about 1 km in diameter and 5 m high exposing strongly deformed and steeply dipping bedrock interpreted as a central uplift.^{,} Sedimentary rocks comprising the rim are of Early Cretaceous to Palaeogene age, while uplifted rocks in the centre are likely of Early Permian age, all part of the Canning Basin; the impact event itself is inferred to be of Paleocene (early Paleogene) age or later.^{,}
