= Maralinga to Emu Road =

Maralinga to Emu Road South Australia
- A map of the Maralinga to Emu Road (purple)
- Coordinates: 28.637309°S 132.195021°E (North end); 30.158876°S 131.576610°E (South end)

General information
- Type: Track
- Length: 198 km (123 mi)
- Built by: Len Beadell

Major junctions
- North end: Anne Beadell Highway; Emu, South Australia
- South end: Emu Road; Maralinga, South Australia

Location(s)
- Region: Eyre Western

Restrictions
- Permits: 2 required
- Facilities: none

Maralinga to Emu Road is a remote unsealed outback track that links Maralinga to Emu in the western region of South Australia. It was built by Len Beadell for the Weapons Research Establishment of Salisbury, South Australia in 1955.

== History ==
Following two successful atomic bomb tests at Emu in October 1953, a new site with better access for men and equipment was needed. Beadell had selected and surveyed the sites for Woomera and Emu, so he was asked once again to locate a more suitable site for further nuclear tests. He carried out a solo 800-kilometre (500 mi) reconnaissance in the southern Great Victoria Desert, locating a suitable site 39 km (24 mi) north north-east of Watson siding on the Trans-Australian Railway.

Beadell spent most of 1954 and the first half of 1955 carrying out survey work for the establishment of the township of what was to become Maralinga. When the work was completed, it was necessary to link the old bomb testing field and the new one by road, so Beadell carried out a survey north to Emu in early August 1955, naming Observatory Hill on the way. Once back at Maralinga, he assembled a team with a bulldozer and grader and they began building a road to Emu, beginning on 19 August 1955.

The team was later dubbed the Gunbarrel Road Construction Party by Beadell as a joke, but the name stuck and passed into folklore. When the road was within 23 km (14 mi) of Emu, the bulldozer was recalled to Maralinga. Another had been left at Emu following the bomb test two years earlier, so it was obtained to complete the road to Emu, which occurred on 17 September 1955.

=== Today ===
Maralinga to Emu road is closed to traffic, in its entirety, to everyone.

=== Footnote ===
After construction of a road from Mabel Creek to Emu in early 1953 (see Anne Beadell Highway), this road was effectively the second road built by Beadell. He had bulldozed a track from the centreline of the firing range to intercept the Mabel Creek to Emu road in late 1953. The builder of the 39 km (24 mi) section from Watson siding to Maralinga is not documented in references used, and is additional to the length built by Beadell.

== See also ==
- Anne Beadell Highway
- British nuclear tests at Maralinga
- Maralinga Tjarutja
- Vokes Hill Corner to Cook Road
