= Sandy Blight Junction Road =

Track in the Northern Territory and Western Australia

Sandy Blight Junction Road Northern Territory–Western Australia
- Sandy Blight Junction Road

General information
- Type: Track
- Length: 331 km (206 mi)
- Built by: Len Beadell

Major junctions
- NNE end: Sandy Blight Junction
- SSW end: Great Central Road

Location(s)
- Region: Central Australia

Restrictions
- Permits: 2 required
- Fuel supply: None
- Facilities: Bore water (23°45′06″S 128°54′28″E)

The Sandy Blight Junction Road is a remote outback track in Australia joining the Great Central Road, Western Australia and Gary Junction Road, Northern Territory. It was built under the direction of legendary surveyor Len Beadell as part of a network of roads for the Weapons Research Establishment at Woomera, South Australia. It is located approximately 500 km (310 mi) west of Alice Springs.

== History ==
Following construction of the Gunbarrel Highway (completed in 1958), Beadell and the Gunbarrel Road Construction Party were tasked to survey and build a road connecting it with a proposed east-west road some 300 km (190 mi) further north. The requirement was related to future National Mapping Council surveys for the Woomera Rocket Range.

On 31 March 1960, Beadell selected a stand of desert oak trees 30 km (19 mi) south-east of Giles as the commencement point for the road. From there the road steered north-east past Schwerin Mural Crescent (named by Ernest Giles in 1874) then veered north towards Walter James Range. When examining this area Beadell discovered a small rock basin containing crystal-clear water, Bungabiddy (or Pangkupirri) Rock Hole. He ensured that his new road passed close by the water hole for the benefit of future travellers.

A problem confronting Beadell was to find a way around Lake Hopkins, a large salt lake consisting of many muddy patches linked by narrow connections. His preference was to head north-east towards Sir Frederick Range, but after much trial and error, he was forced to the west, and it took until mid May to bypass the obstacle. On reaching Sir Frederick Range, Beadell had his team bulldoze a side track to the highest point as access to the site for a future Trig station.

Just beyond this point, Beadell discovered a series of Aboriginal petroglyphs on a smooth rock surface located in a creek bed. Neatly carved spirals, concentric circles, shapes of animal and bird tracks were revealed to him, the only ones of this type he had seen. The track then veered to the east, passed south of further obstacles (Lake Macdonald and Bonython Range) and headed towards Davenport Hills. It was on this section that the border between Western Australia and the Northern Territory was crossed. Beadell determined the latitude and longitude using his theodolite for astronomical observations, and marked the border with four desert oak poles and associated aluminium plates on 10 June.

Construction of the track continued past Davenport Hills (22 June) and the Tropic of Capricorn (25 June), which was marked with a pole and aluminium plate. The team arrived at Mt Leisler on 29 June. Beadell had spent some time near Mt Leisler looking for a tree which had been blazed by the explorer William Tietkens in May 1889, and when he discovered its position, made the road pass nearby, marking the location with his trademark signpost.

By 4 July the road had passed the northern end of Kintore Range to the present position of a T-junction with the future east-west Gary Junction Road, and continued north for another 26 km (16 mi). Up until then, the road was simply known as the north road, and on 7 July work was halted while Beadell was recalled to Adelaide. During his trip to rejoin the crew he was smitten with a severe eye ailment known as Sandy blight (Trachoma). Despite concerted efforts by the doctor and padre at Woomera to persuade him to rest, he continued on. The condition caused him great difficulty with star observations, so he decided that the T-junction would be called Sandy Blight Junction. On 27 August 1960, the precise location of the junction was fixed, and the name Sandy Blight Junction Road came into general use. The section to the north was never used.

As soon as it was finished, Beadell and team began work on their next assignment, the Gary Junction Road.

== Points of interest ==
The Sandy Blight Junction Road is considered to be one of the most picturesque tracks in outback Australia, and was Beadell's favourite. Its present-day southern terminus is 27 km (17 mi) west of Kaltukatjara (Docker River) and 77 km (48 mi) east of Warakurna Community (Giles). The original start point has been bypassed by more recent construction of the Great Central Road. Beadell placed eleven signposts and one large rock (200 mile mark) at significant points along the road. Most of the signs have since been replaced with replicas, as many original plates have been taken as souvenirs.

At Bungabiddy rockhole (of which there were two pools) he was unable to touch the bottom when in the water, so he presumed that it was deep enough to be permanent water. Beadell may have thought he was the first European to sight this feature, but a notorious dingo bounty hunter named Paddy de Conlay had carved his name and the date "1936" on a rock nearby.

During a reconnaissance in the Davenport Hills vicinity, Beadell sighted an animal he had never seen before. He was a fairly accomplished artist, so when he returned to his Land Rover, he drew a sketch of the animal from memory. When the sketch was shown to zoologists later, the animal was instantly recognised as the Black-footed Rock-wallaby, Petrogale lateralis.

The dirt road can be heavily corrugated, there are no food or fuel facilities along the track, but there is a bore water hand pump available for passing travellers. A turnoff to the community of Tjukurla is marked by a giant stiletto shoe, brightly painted in indigenous motifs by local artists. Tietkens' blazed tree is visible near Mt. Leisler, however it has fallen over. When Beadell rediscovered the tree in 1960, it was still standing with leaves on its branches. Just east of Kintore Range near Sandy Blight Junction, Beadell discovered a pile of huge granite boulders, reminiscent of the Devils Marbles south of Tennant Creek. Photographs he took appear in his book Beating About the Bush.

The nearest available fuel to the southern end is at Kaltukatjara (Docker River) on the Great Central Road, and to the north is at Kintore near Sandy Blight Junction. Two permits are required to travel on the road, one for the Western Australian section and one for the Northern Territory section, with prescribed travel conditions for both. Additionally, a permit is required for travel on the Great Central Road.

== Gallery ==
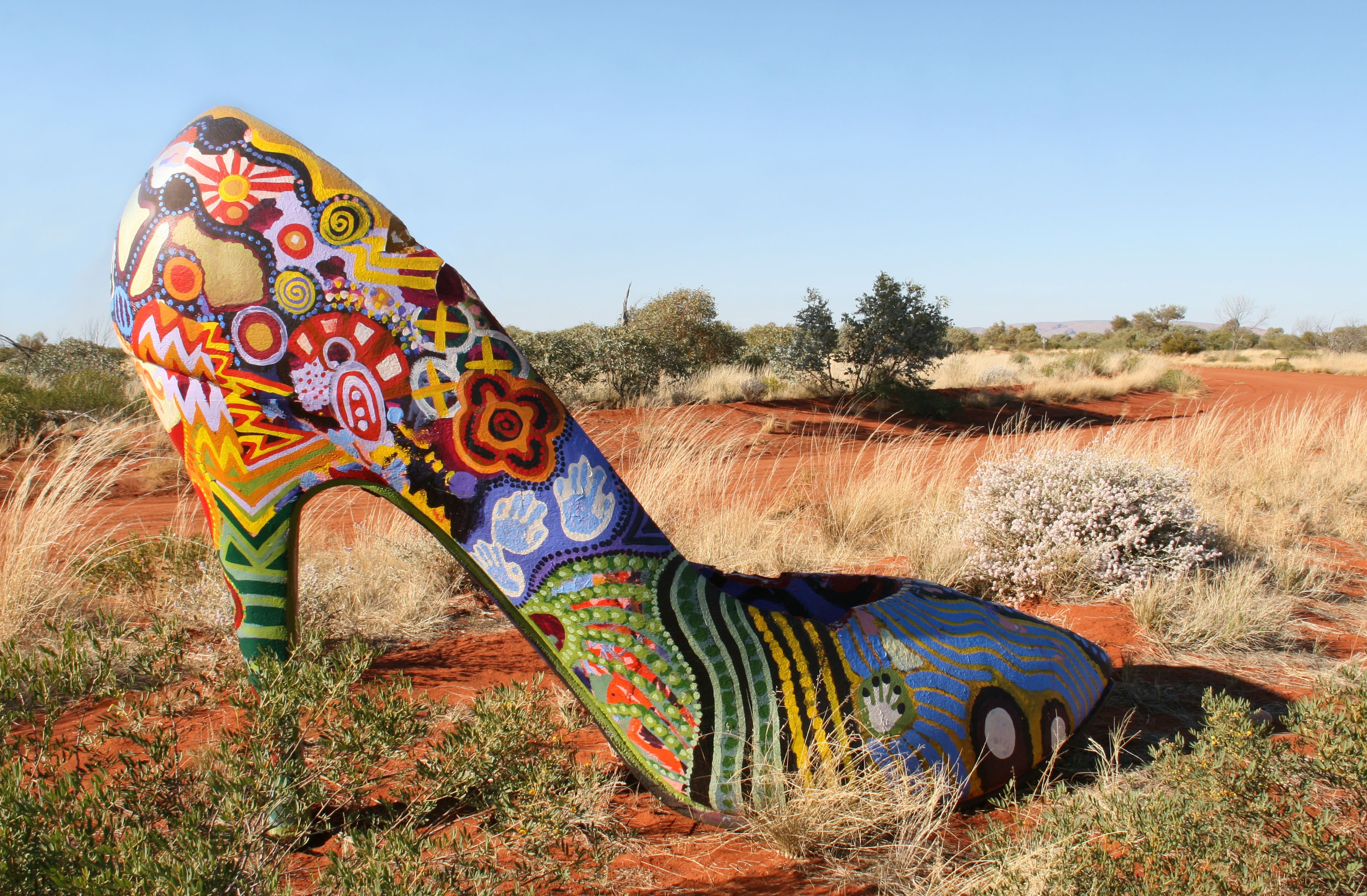
Giant stiletto at the turnoff to Tjukurla

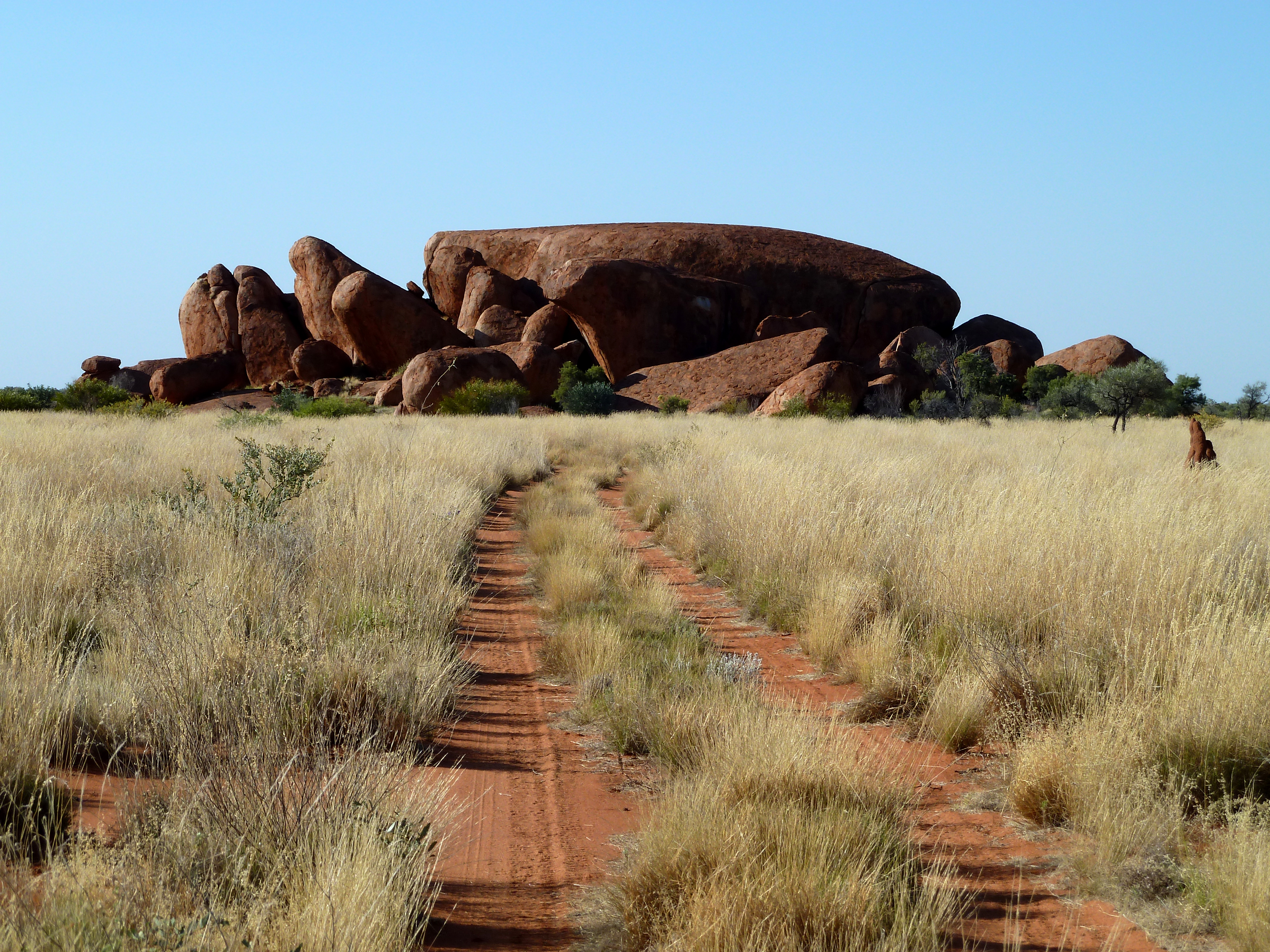
Rock formation near Kintore

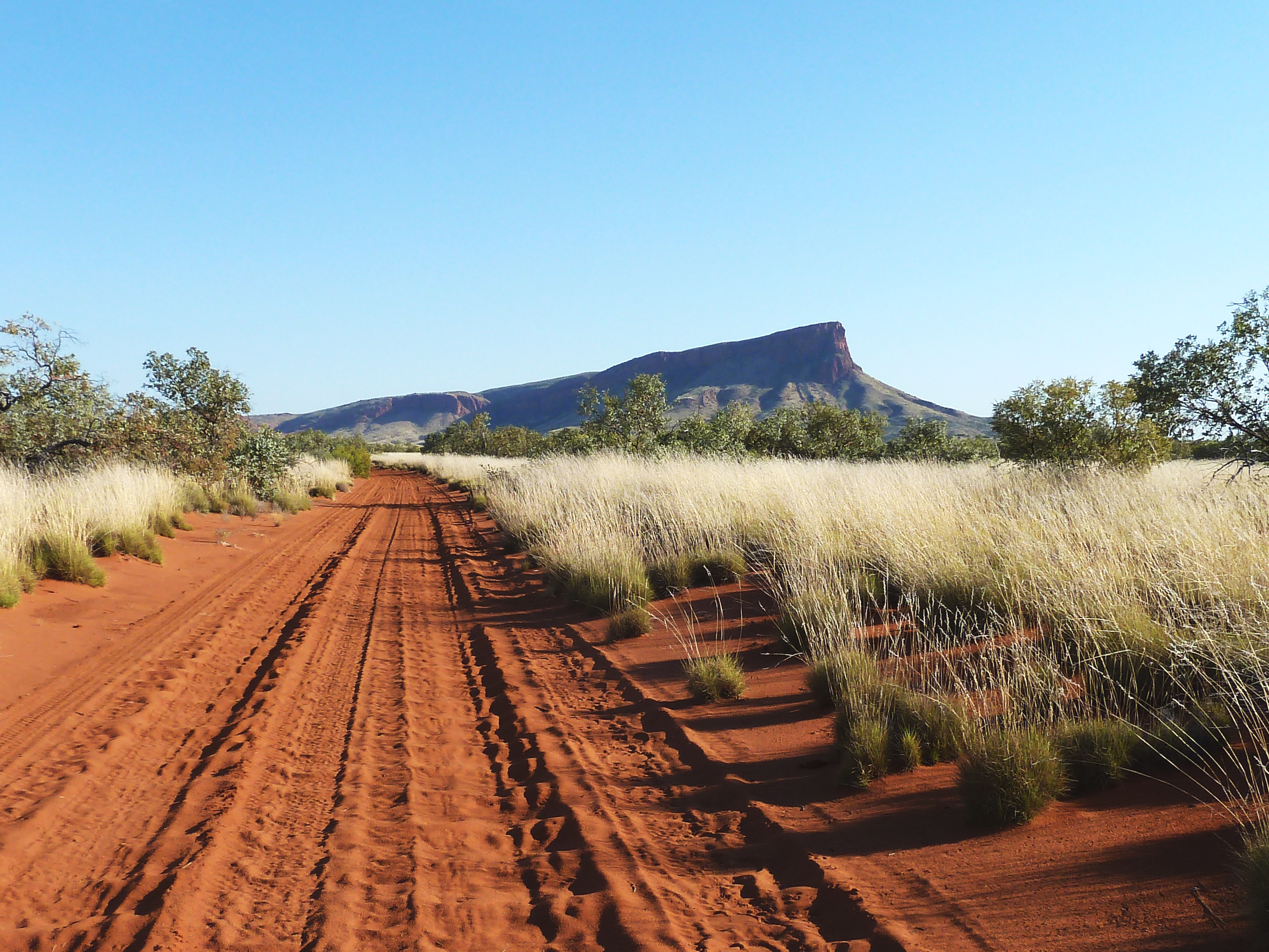
Mt. Leisler viewed from the Sandy Blight Junction Road

== See also ==
- Gary Highway
