= Acacia minutissima =

Scientific classification
- Kingdom: Plantae
- Clade: Tracheophytes
- Clade: Angiosperms
- Clade: Eudicots
- Clade: Rosids
- Order: Fabales
- Family: Fabaceae
- Subfamily: Caesalpinioideae
- Clade: Mimosoid clade
- Genus: Acacia
- Species: A. minutissima

Binomial name
- Acacia minutissima Maslin

Synonyms
- Acacia maitlandii variant; Acacia minutissima Maslin manuscript name; Acacia sp. Talawana (B.R.Maslin 8540) WA Herbarium

Species of legume

Acacia minutissima is a species of flowering plant in the family Fabaceae, and is endemic to inland parts of Western Australia. It is a diffuse, intricately and openly branched shrub with asymmetrically elliptic to triangular phyllodes, spherical heads of bright, golden yellow flowers, and firmly papery, linear pods rounded over the seeds.

== Description ==
Acacia minutissima is a diffuse, intricately and openly branched, sometimes semi-prostrate shrub that typically grows to a height of 0.3–1.5 m (1 ft 0 in – 4 ft 11 in) and 1–3 m (3 ft 3 in – 9 ft 10 in) wide, the stem usually dividing just above ground level to form horizontally spreading branches. Its bark is light grey and slightly roughened, with glabrous ribbed, light brown or reddish brown branchlets near their ends ageing to grey. The phyllodes are asymmetrically elliptic to triangular with the narrower end towards the base, 3–6 mm (0.12–0.24 in) long, 2–3 mm (0.079–0.118 in) wide, with a distinct, glabrous cusp 0.5–1 mm (0.020–0.039 in) long and 2–3 mm (0.079–0.118 in) wide on the end. The lower ends of the phyllodes are shallowly convex or straight, with a central midrib and a gland at or above the centre of the upper margin. There are persistent, erect stipules 0.5–1 mm (0.020–0.039 in) long and often enveloped in resin at the base of the phyllodes. The flowers are borne in a spherical head in axils on a glabrous red peduncle 6–8 mm (0.24–0.31 in) long, each head with 40 to 50 golden yellow flowers. Flowering occurs from about July to September, and the pods are linear to narrowly oblong and flat, 10–40 mm (0.39–1.57 in) long, 3–4 mm (0.12–0.16 in) wide, glabrous, firmly papery and rounded over the seeds.

== Taxonomy ==
Acacia minutissima was first formally described in 2008 by Bruce Maslin in the journal Nuytsia from specimens he collected 41.5 km (25.8 mi) east of the Balfour Downs homestead turnoff on the Talawana Track to the Canning Stock Route in 2006. The specific epithet (minutissima) is derived from the Latin words meaning 'very small', in reference to the size of the phyllodes.

== Distribution and habitat ==
This species of wattle grows in sand or loam, on plains or in the swales between dunes, often with spinifex, in discontinuous populations between Balfour Downs Station and east to the vicinity of Kumpupintil Lake, in the Gibson Desert, Great Sandy Desert, Little Sandy Desert and Pilbara bioregions of Western Australia.

== See also ==
- List of Acacia species
