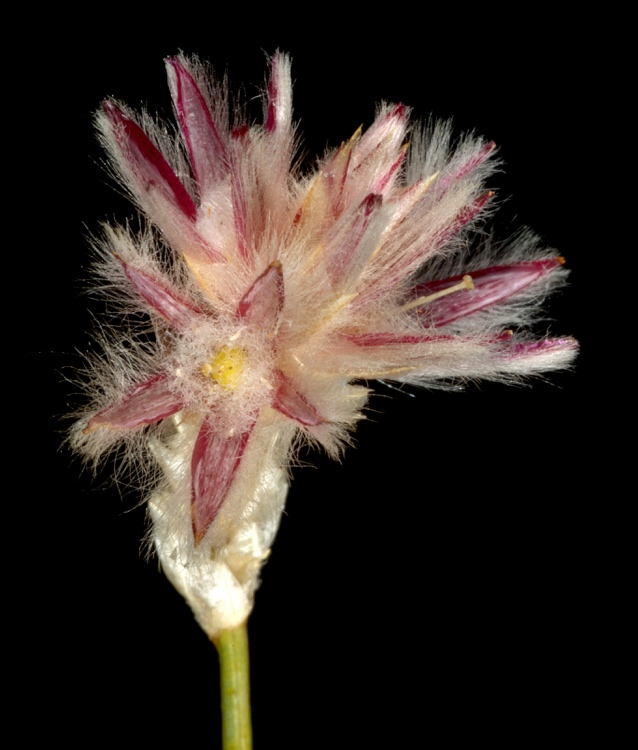
- North of the Talawana Track to Rudall River National Park

Scientific classification
- Kingdom: Plantae
- Clade: Tracheophytes
- Clade: Angiosperms
- Clade: Eudicots
- Order: Caryophyllales
- Family: Amaranthaceae
- Genus: Ptilotus
- Species: P. aphyllus

Binomial name
- Ptilotus aphyllus Benl

= Ptilotus aphyllus =

Species of grass-like plant

Ptilotus aphyllus is a species of flowering plant in the family Amaranthaceae and is endemic to the a small area of inland Western Australia. It is a leafless perennial, except when young, and spikes of purple flowers fading to pink and pale orange.

== Description ==
Ptilotus aphyllus is a shrubby perennial with many slender branches that typically grows up to 1 m (3 ft 3 in) high and 45 cm (18 in) wide. Young plants have egg-shaped to linear leaves 6–13 mm (0.24–0.51 in) long and 1.5–2 mm (0.059–0.079 in) wide, older plants have leafless, rush-like stems. The flowers are borne in spikes of up to 15, 7–16 mm (0.28–0.63 in) wide on a hairy rachis. There are hairy bracts 3.2–4 mm (0.13–0.16 in) long and hairy bracteoles 3.8–5 mm (0.15–0.20 in) long and 2.5–3.3 mm (0.098–0.130 in) long at the base of the flowers. The tepals are purple, fading to pink and pale orange, the outer tepals 6.7–8.2 mm (0.26–0.32 in) long and the inner tepals 6.2–7.6 mm (0.24–0.30 in) long. There are five fertile stamens and the ovary is hairy. Flowering occurs from March to May.

== Taxonomy ==
Ptilotus aphyllus was first formally described in 1980 by Gerhard Benl in the journal Nuytsia from specimens collected by Alex George north of Mundiwindi in 1962. The specific epithet (aphyllus) means 'without leaves'.

== Distribution and habitat ==
This species of Ptilotus grows in red sand soils on sand dunes mainly along the western edge of the Great Sandy Desert and in the Gascoyne and Pilbara bioregions of inland Western Australia.

== Conservation status ==
Ptilotus aphyllus is listed as "not threatened" by the Government of Western Australia Department of Biodiversity, Conservation and Attractions.

== See also ==
- List of Ptilotus species
