= Connie Sue Highway =

Track in Western Australia

Connie Sue Highway Western Australia
- Connie Sue Highway (blue and white)

General information
- Type: Track
- Length: 650 km (404 mi)

Major junctions
- NNE end: Warburton
- SSW end: Rawlinna

Location(s)
- Region: Goldfields–Esperance

Restrictions
- Permits: 1 required for Warburton
- Fuel supply: Warburton
- Facilities: Warburton

The Connie Sue Highway is an outback unsealed track that runs between the Aboriginal community of Warburton on the Great Central Road and Rawlinna on the Trans-Australian Railway. It lies entirely in the state of Western Australia, crosses the Great Victoria Desert and Nullarbor Plain, and is approximately 650 km (400 mi) long.

== History ==
The Warburton-Rawlinna road was pioneered as part of a network of roads for the Weapons Research Establishment at Woomera, South Australia. Surveying began in July 1962, when Len Beadell, with wife Anne and baby Connie Sue, left Adelaide and travelled via the Stuart Highway and the Gunbarrel Highway to Warburton. From there they bushbashed roughly 300 km (190 mi) south in his Land Rover, until reaching the approximate latitude of the Anne Beadell Highway, which was under construction from the east. Turning east, they drove another 150 km (93 mi) through the Great Victoria desert to a point west of Serpentine Lakes to join up with his Gunbarrel Road Construction Party (GRCP). They ran out of fuel and water about 10 km (6.2 mi) short of their destination, but with the aid of radio and flares, were joined by their team.

Beadell and family then began a reconnaissance west towards Neale Junction, followed by the GRCP. After two weeks of intense activity during August, the Anne Beadell Highway reached Neale Junction. From there, Beadell and party then commenced building a new road north towards Warburton. Just north of Neale Junction, Beadell's infant daughter Connie Sue was observed standing up for the first time in her tea-chest bassinet. It was decided there and then that the Warburton-Rawlinna road would be known as the Connie Sue Highway. The 320 kilometre section of new road reached Warburton on 15 September. After obtaining supplies, the construction team turned south and by early October were back at Neale Junction. Beadell then began surveying south towards Rawlinna to make the southern half of the new Connie Sue Highway. The GRCP with bulldozer and grader followed Beadell's tracks, constructing the road as they went. By the end of October the road was completed, and the Beadell family returned to Adelaide via the Eyre Highway.

== Additional details ==
Approximately halfway along the route is Neale Junction, 172 km (107 mi) west of Ilkurlka, where the highway intersects with another outback road, the Anne Beadell Highway.

The road, like many Len Beadell built, is a "highway" in name only. It is remote and does not carry regular traffic. There is no available ground water and it is one of the longest stretches in Australia between fuel pumps. The only place on the highway that sells fuel is Warburton. There is no fuel for sale at Rawlinna. The closest available is more than 100 km (62 mi) to the south, at Caiguna or Cocklebiddy, on the Eyre Highway.

The track is not considered suitable for unprepared travellers. A free permit is required to travel on track in the Ngaanyatjarrak determination area and to enter Warburton. Obtaining a permit for the track requires a minimum of five working days turnaround.

== Gallery ==
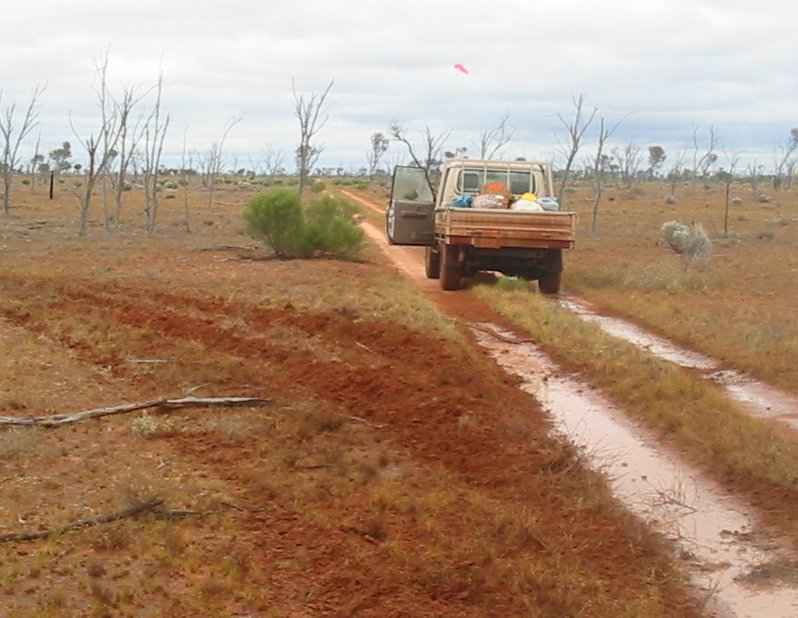
Connie Sue Highway after heavy rain

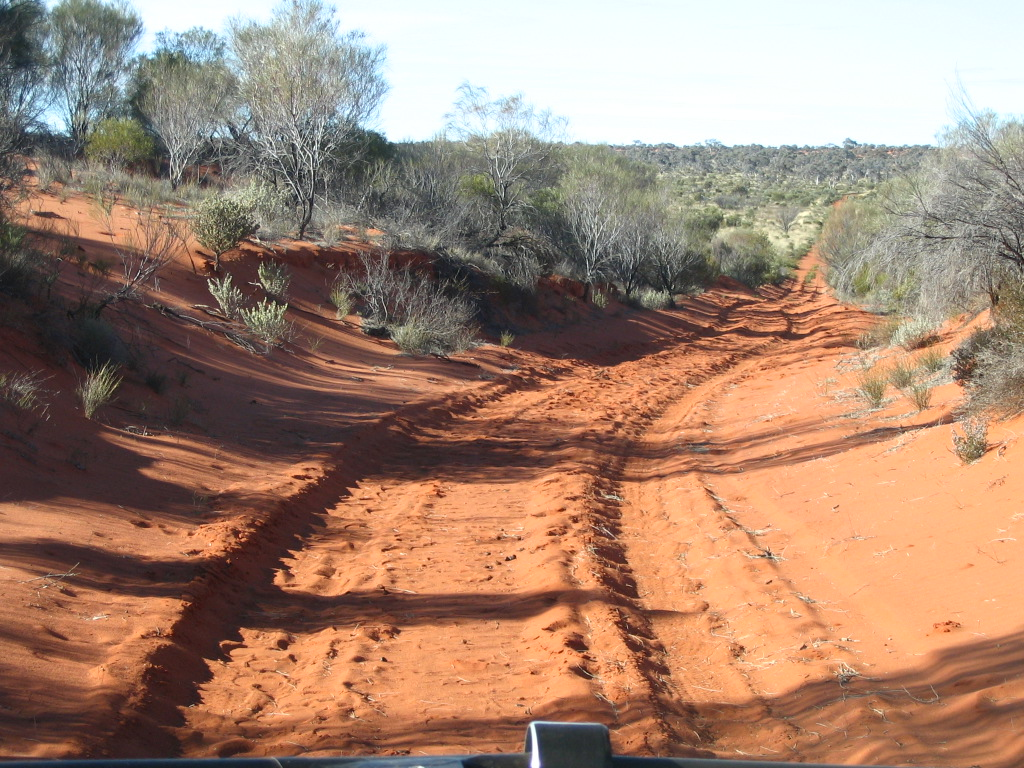
View of the Connie Sue Highway in 2007

== See also ==
- Highways in Australia
- List of highways in Western Australia

== Notes ==
- Hema Maps Australia's great desert tracks. Eight Mile Plains, Qld. : Hema Maps, 2005. 3rd ed. Scale 1:1,250 000; Lambert conformal conic proj. (E 119°00'--E 129°20'/S 024°35'--S 032°30') ISBN 1-86500-161-9
