= Gunbarrel Road Construction Party =

Team of Australian road builders

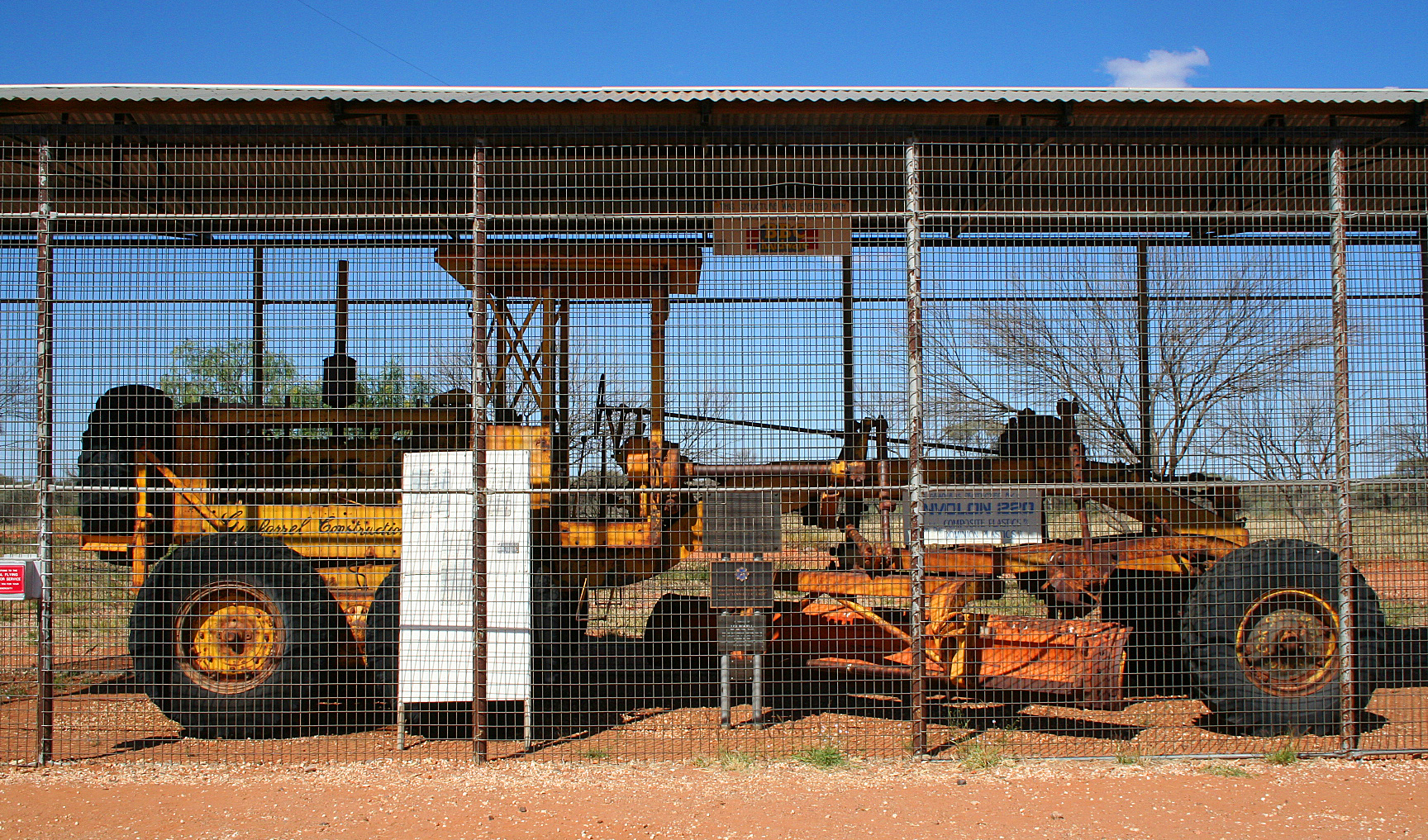
The original grader of the Gunbarrel Highway

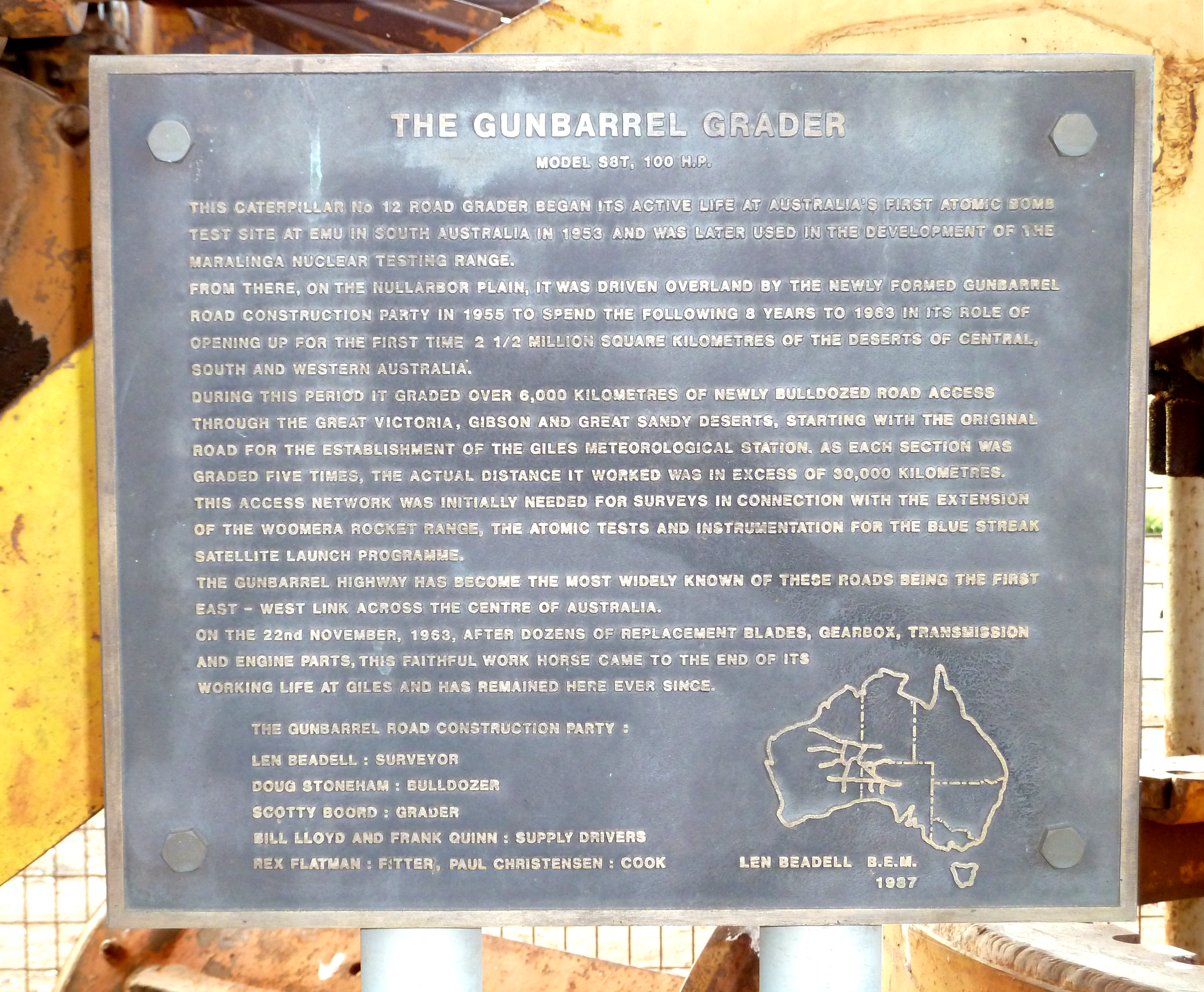
A plaque on the Caterpillar No.12 grader at Giles Weather Station, Western Australia

The Gunbarrel Road Construction Party (GRCP) was the name bestowed upon a team of road builders by Len Beadell in 1955, after which the well known outback track Gunbarrel Highway was named. Over a period of eight years, Beadell and the GRCP built more than 6,000 kilometres of dirt roads in remote areas of central Australia for the Weapons Research Establishment at Woomera, South Australia.

By the time they had completed their work in December 1963, the GRCP had built eleven major roads in twenty-four separate stages across South Australia, the Northern Territory and Western Australia.

== Background ==
In Len Beadell's book Beating about the Bush, he explained how the name of the party was derived. During many kilometres of driving around sand-ridges and spinifex hummocks, the mental picture of a corkscrew kept appearing before his mind's eye, when the word "straight" described what was desired. Suddenly the word "gunbarrel" representing something very straight materialised in his mind, so on return to camp, he announced to his team that they were to be known as the Gunbarrel Road Construction Party. This was well received by the men, and the name passed into folklore. He later joked, "It didn't matter that when we got to the sandhills, a more suitable name might have been 'The Corkscrew Road Construction Party'".

Beadell's usual method for building roads was to carry out a solo reconnaissance in his Land Rover, bush-bashing through virgin scrub, referring to a magnetic compass for direction, and the vehicle's odometer for distance. When he had determined a feasible path he would return to camp and guide a bulldozer by standing on top of his vehicle while flashing reflected sunlight from a mirror towards the driver. Beadell joked that the bulldozer driver followed the flashing mirror for eight years and never caught it. If large sandhills intervened, flares fired from a pistol were substituted. Some reconnaissance forays took many days, hundreds of kilometres, and usually several punctured tyres. He used a theodolite to observe stars, the sun and the moon to accurately calculate his position which he termed an "astrofix".

If the path ahead consisted of thick scrub or trees, the bulldozer made the first pass with the blade above ground level to knock the scrub down, then returned with blade lowered to clear the debris. The next pass partially overlapped the first to widen the road. A grader would then make up to five passes over the freshly cleared track, followed by a "cherry-picker" to remove sticks, roots, or stones by hand.

Beadell had built two roads prior to the formation of the GRCP. The first was from Mabel Creek station (west of Coober Pedy) to Emu Field (Feb-Mar 1953), the second was from Maralinga to Emu Field (Aug-Sep 1955). Bill Lloyd was then a member of his road building team. In November 1955 the first members of the GRCP, all hand-picked by Beadell, rendezvoused near Coober Pedy with their vehicles and equipment to start work.

The convoy consisted of three trucks, two Land Rovers, a grader, a bulldozer and several trailers. Led by Len Beadell, the convoy made its way to Victory Downs just over the border in the Northern Territory to begin construction of the Gunbarrel Highway, the first east-west road across central Australia.

== Personnel ==
The original personnel of the GRCP were:

- Len Beadell - Surveyor and Leader
- Doug Stoneham - D8 Bulldozer
- Scotty Boord - Grader
- Bill Lloyd - Supply driver
- Rex Flatman - General mechanic
- Willy Appleton - Cherry-picker
- Paul Christensen - Cook

There were subsequent changes in the composition of the GRCP which included Frank Quinn as supply driver, Shorty Williams as grader driver, Eric Graefling as Cherry-picker. Two other cooks were briefly employed, Cyril Koch and Tom Roberts, but Paul Christensen was the longest serving cook.

On completion of road building in November 1963, the Gunbarrel Road Construction Party's grader, a Caterpillar No 12 Model S8T, was retired from duty at Giles Weather Station. It was driven to Giles by Doug Stoneham when the Talawana Track was finished. Doug Stoneham had left the GRCP in 1960 to get married, but returned in 1963 to operate the grader. In 1988 Len Beadell drove the grader into its final home for preservation, a steel cage.

The D8 Caterpillar bulldozer that was used to build the Gunbarrel Highway was left at Carnegie Station by Doug Stoneham when the road was finished. Other D7 cable bulldozers were used to build subsequent roads. The whereabouts of the D8 dozer was a mystery for some years, but when an article in Australian Geographic was published in 1995, its owner Bill McLay from Perth WA recognised a photograph of it. Dick Smith the founder of Australian Geographic, purchased it from Mr McLay.

== See also ==
- Anne Beadell Highway
- Connie Sue Highway
- Gary Highway
- Gary Junction Road
- Gunbarrel Highway
- Mount Davies Road (includes Kintore Avenue)
- Sandy Blight Junction Road
- Talawana Track
- Vokes Hill Corner to Cook Road
