= Vokes Hill Corner to Cook Road =

Unsealed outback track in Australia

Vokes Hill Corner to Cook Road South Australia
- A map of the Vokes Hill Corner to Cook Road (purple)
- Coordinates: 28.564935°S 130.686784°E (North end); 30.612658°S 130.412549°E (South end)

General information
- Type: Track
- Length: 268 km (167 mi)
- Built by: Len Beadell

Major junctions
- North end: Anne Beadell Highway; Vokes Hill Corner, South Australia
- South end: Cook Road; Cook, South Australia

Location(s)
- Region: Eyre Western

Restrictions
- Permits: 1 required
- Fuel supply: none

Vokes Hill Corner to Cook Road is a remote unsealed outback track that links Vokes Hill Corner on the Anne Beadell Highway to Cook on the Trans-Australian Railway in the far west of South Australia. It was built by Len Beadell for the Australian Government's Weapons Research Establishment in late 1961.

== Background ==
The Vokes Hill Corner to Cook road was built as part of a series of roads that were constructed to support the Woomera Rocket Range project during the 1950s and 1960s. The road provided access to the Trans-Australian Railway line for ease of re-supply, while construction of the Anne Beadell Highway was still taking place. It also completed a loop together with the Maralinga to Emu Road so that Native Patrol Officers could monitor the movements of Aboriginal people through the desert.

Reconnaissance for the road was made difficult as the direction of sand ridges was across the path of Beadell's vehicle, and the northern half of the track was through thick mulga scrub. It was not until Beadell reached the Nullarbor Plain that the ground became firmer and more open. Construction from Vokes Hill Corner began on 23 September 1961 and reached Cook on 20 November 1961. En route the road passed three native wells that Beadell had re-located, namely Waldana, Churina and Bringyna.

Vokes Hill was named during an expedition by explorer Richard Maurice in July 1901. His general hand and cook on the journey was William Paul Voake.

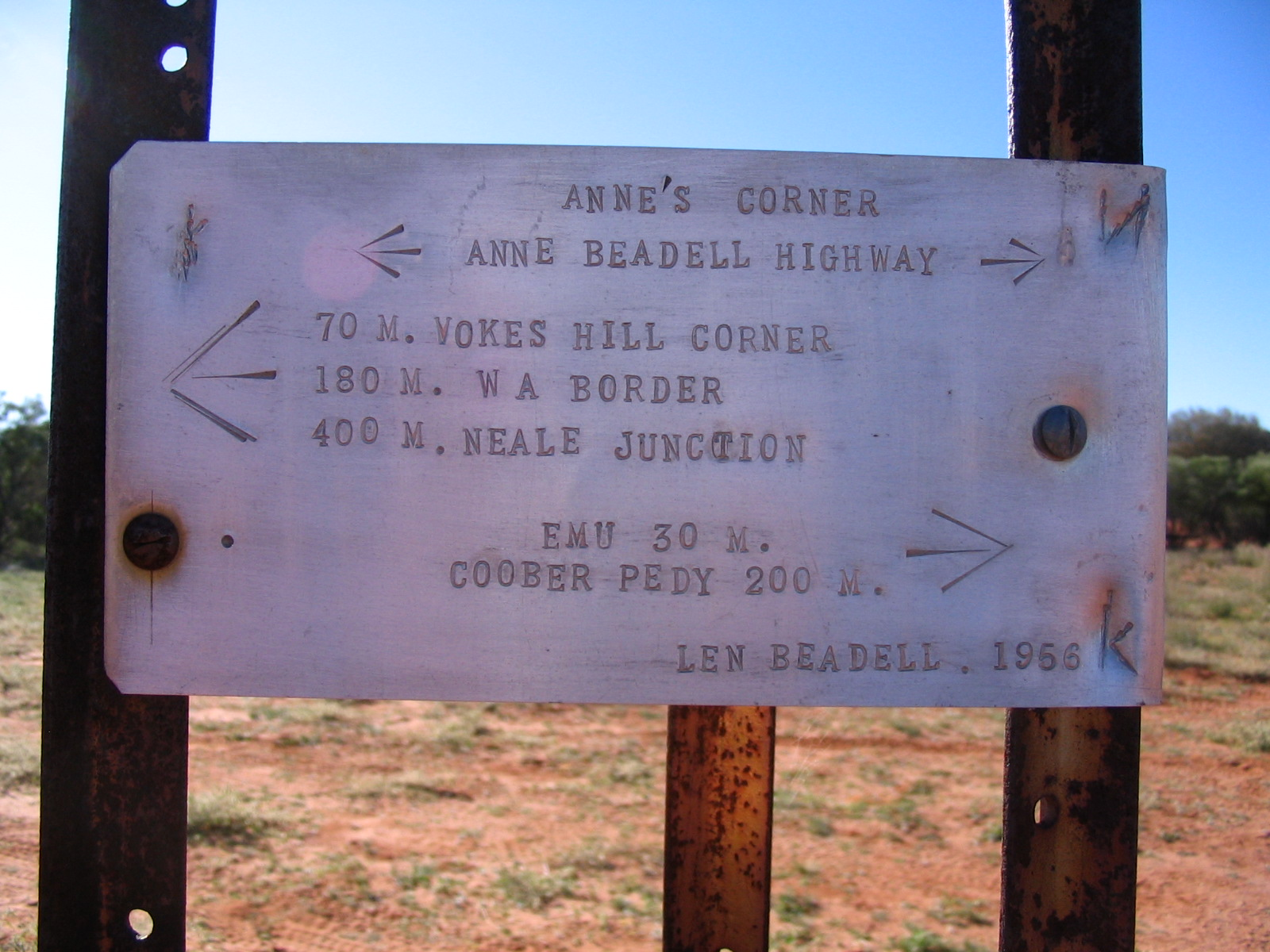
Sign at Anne's Corner showing distance (miles) to Vokes Hill Corner

== See also ==
- Anne Beadell Highway
- British nuclear tests at Maralinga
- Maralinga Tjarutja
