= Talawana Track =

Remote track in Western Australia

Talawana Track Western Australia
- Map of the Talawana Track in WA

General information
- Type: Track
- Length: 596 km (370 mi)
- Opened: 1963
- Built by: Len Beadell, Gunbarrel Road Construction Party

Major junctions
- WNW end: Jigalong turn
- ESE end: Windy Corner

Restrictions
- Permits: may be required
- Fuel supply: none

The Talawana Track is a remote unsealed track that runs between Windy Corner on the Gary Highway and the Marble Bar Road in Western Australia, a distance of 596 kilometres. The majority of it was built by Len Beadell and the Gunbarrel Road Construction Party in 1963 as part of a series of connecting roads for the Woomera rocket range in South Australia. It was the final road they built.

== Reconnaissance ==
The Gunbarrel Road Construction Party (GRCP) arrived at Callawa Station 22 July 1963, having completed 1350 kilometres of the new Gary Junction Road from Liebig Bore in the Northern Territory. Beadell's Land Rover and most of the other vehicles made their way to Port Hedland for badly needed maintenance, prior to commencing work on the next road. Once the vehicles were serviced, they made their way to Marble Bar, where Beadell parted company with the crew, as they were returning along the Gary Junction Road to regrade it, while Beadell set off in a southerly direction to begin a 600 km reconnaissance for the new track.

Beadell travelled via Nullagine, Ethel Creek Station, Billanooka (sic) and Walgun to the ruins of the abandoned Talawana homestead, where he arrived 2 August 1963. He then drove east into the Gibson Desert spinifex, and crossed the remnants of the Rabbit-proof fence. He discovered a survey marker placed by Alfred Canning who had been there 70 years earlier while building the fence. A major obstacle that lay across the path was the McKay Range, which Beadell struggled to traverse. After he found a way through, he came to a crystal clear water hole, and noticed fresh human footprints near the edge. Further on he saw smoke rising above the spinifex, so he approached the smoke, switched the engine off, and waited for a meeting with an unknown tribe which he knew would come. Soon after, two Aborigines appeared while others kept their distance. Anthropologists were very interested in this discovery, and Beadell was able to take a small study group back to the spot at a later date.

Well 23 on the Canning Stock Route was the next objective, but he was unable to find it though being close. To save time, he continued on to Karara Soak (sic) where he discovered the location of Well 24. This left 200 kilometres to travel through featureless sand and spinifex before he arrived on the cleared path of the Gary Highway. It was 7 August when he settled down to wait for the GRCP to arrive from the north, and for the next five days, the wind was so strong that he was barely able to leave the shelter of his vehicle. This led to his naming of the future corner where he camped, "Windy Corner".

== Road making ==
When the GRCP arrived at Windy Corner, the clutch on the grader was inoperative, so it was decided to tow it behind a three ton truck to Giles for repairs. This resulted in a six-week delay to progress. The original mechanic Rex Flatman was flown to Giles from Maralinga to carry out the repairs. Meanwhile, Beadell flew back to Adelaide as his young boy Gary was to be christened. Once the grader was repaired, work on the Talawana road recommenced on 24 September, with Doug Stoneham as the driver.

Progress was good to Well 24, so Beadell went ahead to search for Well 23 once more. He found it almost immediately, but further problems arose with the gearbox on the grader. The point was 160 kilometres from their destination, and another month's delay resulted. Beadell planned to drive to Rawlinna on the Trans-Australian Railway, to pick up the mechanic and parts, but when 120 kilometres from camp, the gearbox in the Land Rover lost several cogs, and he was restricted in gear selection. This caused a change in plan whereby he drove to Warburton to await the mechanic's arrival by air. It was during two weeks here that Beadell started writing his first book Too Long in the Bush. When the Rover's gearbox was repaired, they proceeded to the broken down grader and repaired its gearbox. Road-building restarted on 30 October and Talawana was reached on 6 November 1963. From there Beadell drove to Ethel Creek to meet with anthropologists, who he took back to visit the unknown tribe, and Stoneham with the rest of the crew regraded the Talawana track on their way back to Giles. Thus road-building by Beadell and the GRCP on behalf of the Woomera rocket range had ended following eight years of desert work, isolation, heat, dust, and flies.

== Supplementary information ==
The length of track made by the GRCP from Windy Corner to the abandoned Talawana ruins was 451 kilometres, where it joined existing station tracks. Access to the southern end of Rudall River National Park is via the Talawana track, at a turn 129 km west of Well 24 on the Canning Stock Route. The Talawana Track and Canning Stock Route are coincident between wells 23 and 24. When Beadell first came to the area in 1963, there was no evidence of the stock route's previous existence apart from the old wells and associated wood and metalwork fittings.

Survey of the Talawana track was unusual in that Beadell began at the opposite end from where work started. His reason was that over the years, he had noticed that parallel sand ridges often came together at the western extremity, resulting in an insurmountable trap. He decided to approach from the western end, which kept him in open ended valleys between the dunes. From the beginning of construction of the Gary Highway in April 1963, the bulldozer had been dispensed with, so all subsequent road construction relied on the grader.

According to Mark Shephard's biography of Beadell, Len preferred to call his last road the Windy Corner Road.

== See also ==
- Gunbarrel Highway
- Jigalong Community, Western Australia
- Karlamilyi National Park
