= Gary Highway =

Track in Western Australia

Gary Highway Western Australia
- Gary Highway in Western Australia

General information
- Type: Track
- Length: 323 km (201 mi)

Restrictions
- Fuel supply: Kunawaritji
- Facilities: None

The Gary Highway is a remote unsealed track in central Western Australia running through the Gibson Desert and the Great Sandy Desert. It was built by Len Beadell's Gunbarrel Road Construction Party in April and May 1963 and named after Beadell's son, who was born in February that year. It connects the Gunbarrel Highway from Everard Junction in the south, to the Gary Junction Road at Gary Junction in the north. It is one of only two north-south tracks in the central deserts of Western Australia, the other being the Sandy Blight Junction Road, also built by Len Beadell.

== Points of interest ==
The Gary Highway passes several interesting points in its 323-kilometre (201 mi) desert crossing:

- Veevers crater, accessible by a track 16 kilometres (9.9 mi) to the east. The visitors' book contains entries from the original team who identified the crater. This meteorite explosion crater is one of only 15 known worldwide, and only 3 in Western Australia. A good description can be found in the Australian Government Heritage site.
- Tropic of Capricorn, with several marker signs in different places, due to the shift of the tropics over time caused by the varying tilt of the Earth's axis, relative to its orbital plane.
- Windy Corner, the junction at the end of the Talawana Track. The origins of the name "Windy Corner" can be read in Beadell's 1983 book End Of An Era.
- McDougall Knoll, which is a good lookout point. There are notes from visitors contained in a tin can jammed in the cairn.
- The junction of the Eagle Highway, which is very overgrown most of its length.
- Patience Well, a well visited and named by David Carnegie in 1896, 15.2 kilometres (9.4 mi) to the east of Windy Corner.
- The Gibson Desert Nature Reserve, which includes McPhersons Pillar. This is 30 km off the track but is a spectacular landmark with excellent views over the Gibson Desert and access to Mulgan Rockhole.
- Charlies Knob.
- Everard Junction on the Gunbarrel Highway, where there is a visitors book.

== Description ==
The track is single lane, relatively clear of scrub, but corrugated over its entire length. It is mostly straight, except for a section from 22.85°S to 22.88°S where the track diverts around sand dunes. It was navigable (Sep 2007) with a hard surface of sand and gravel. The southern end has several wash-aways in the Gibson Desert Nature Reserve.

The approximate length of the track is 425 kilometres (264 mi), including side trips to Veevers Crater and McPhersons Pillar. It is very remote with both ends being hundreds of kilometres from any settlements or supply points. An HF radio or satellite phone should be carried as there are no facilities along this track and travellers should be self-sufficient in fuel, food, water and vehicle support. The nearest northern supplies are at Kunawarritji near Well 33 on the Canning Stock Route and Kiwirrkurra on the Gary Junction Road, or to the south some 300 kilometres (190 mi) south east of Everard Junction at Warburton Roadhouse or Carnegie Station to the west.

== Gallery ==
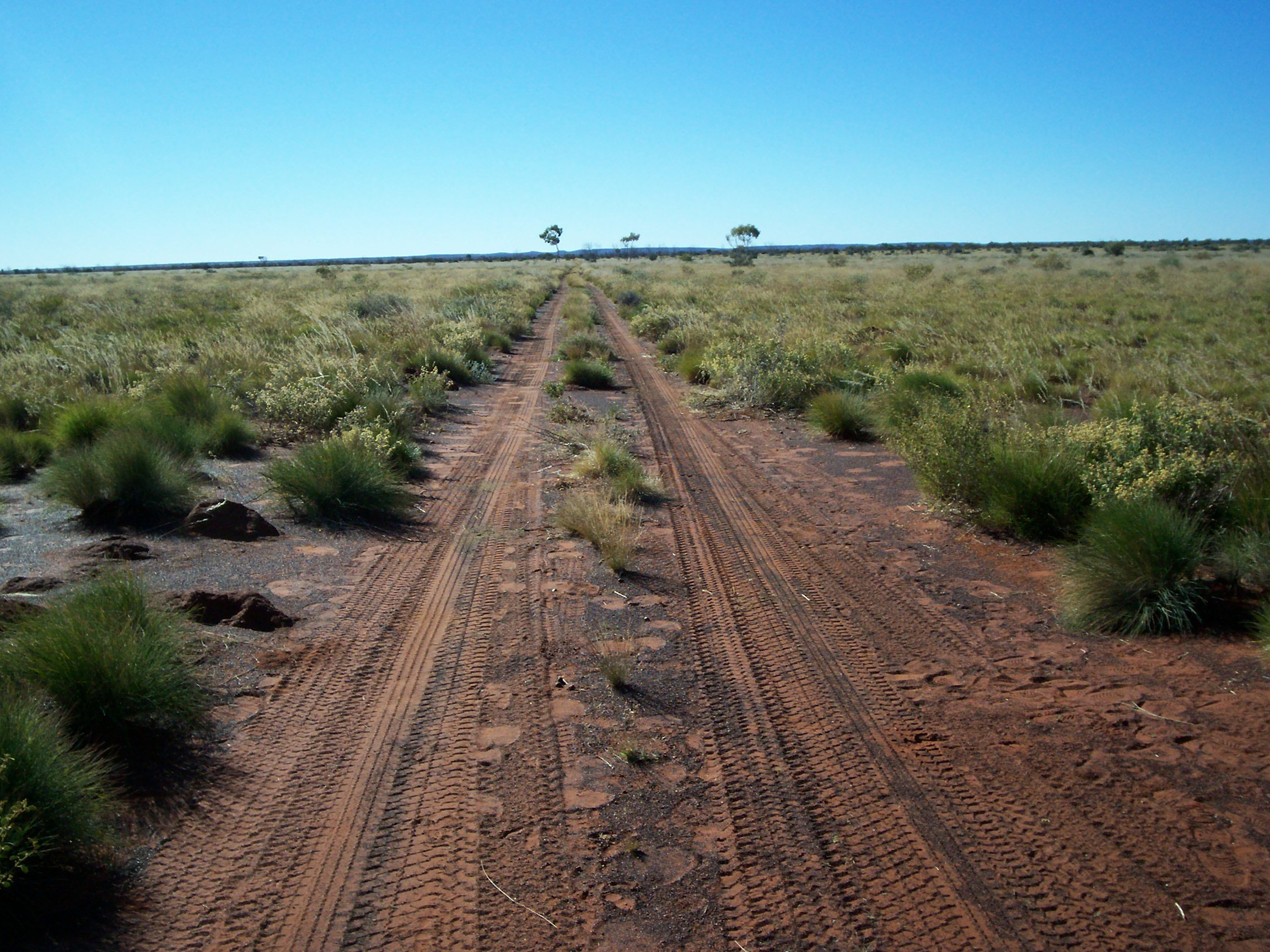
Gary Highway from Everard Junction

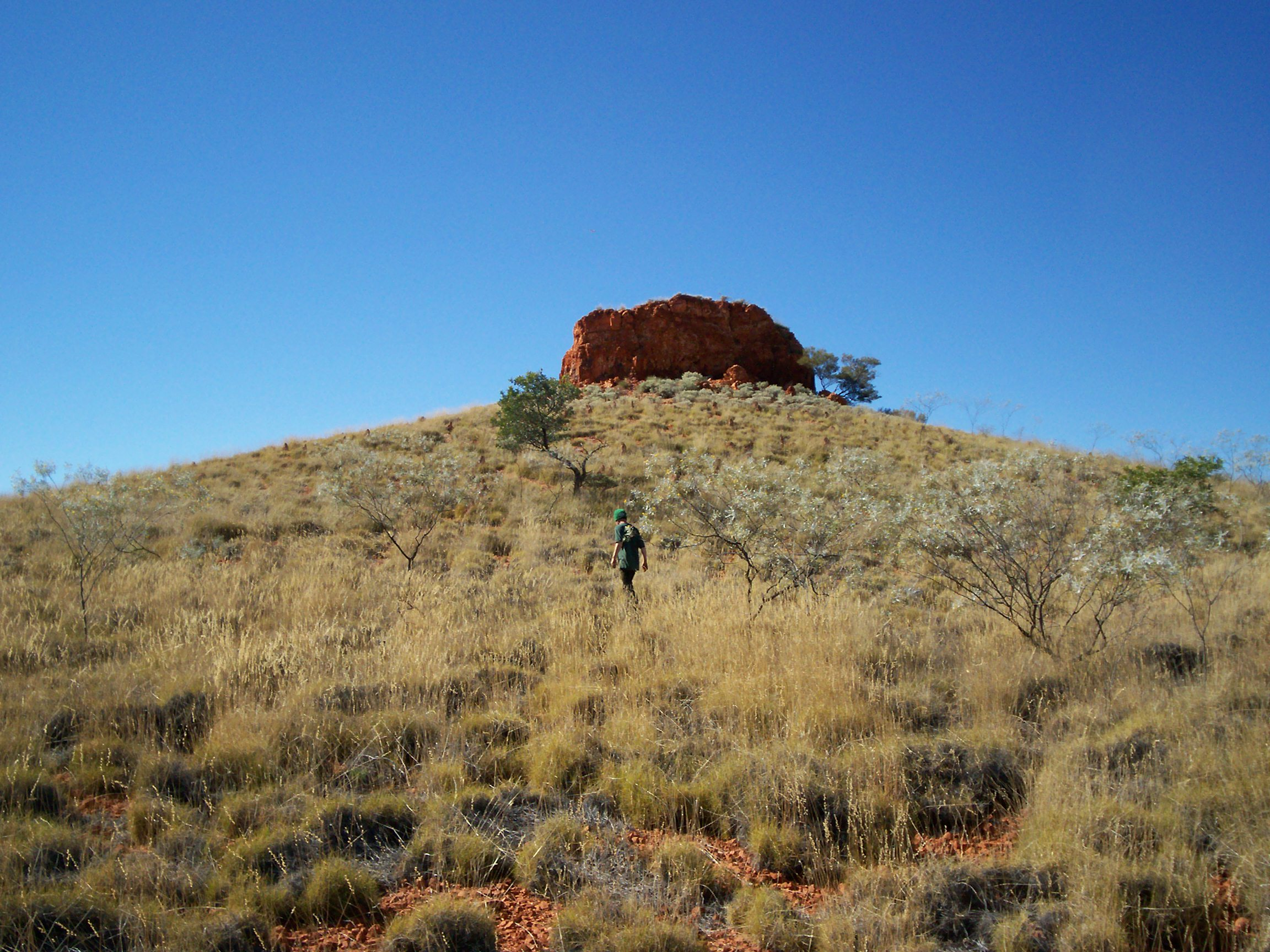
McPhersons Pillar

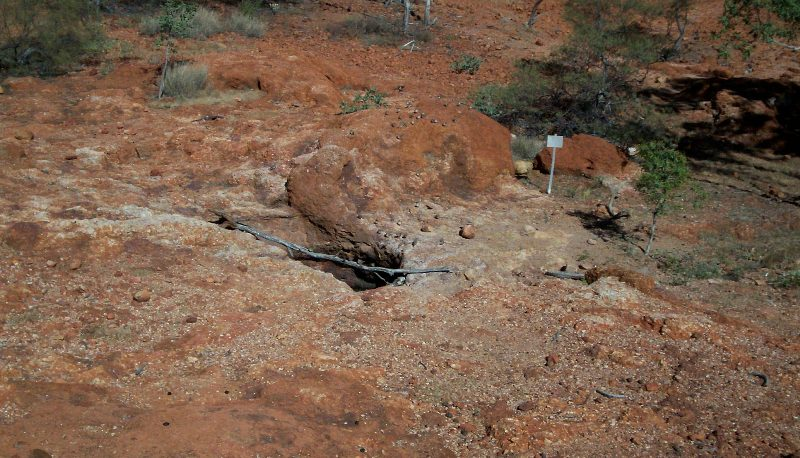
Mulgan Rockhole

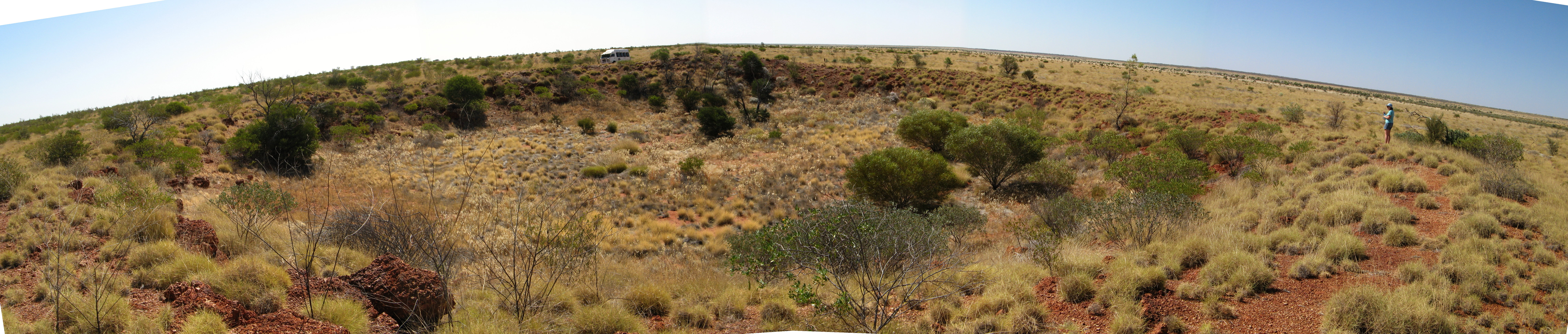
A panorama of Veevers Meteorite Crater
