= Anne Beadell Highway =

Australian outback track

Anne Beadell Highway Western Australia–South Australia
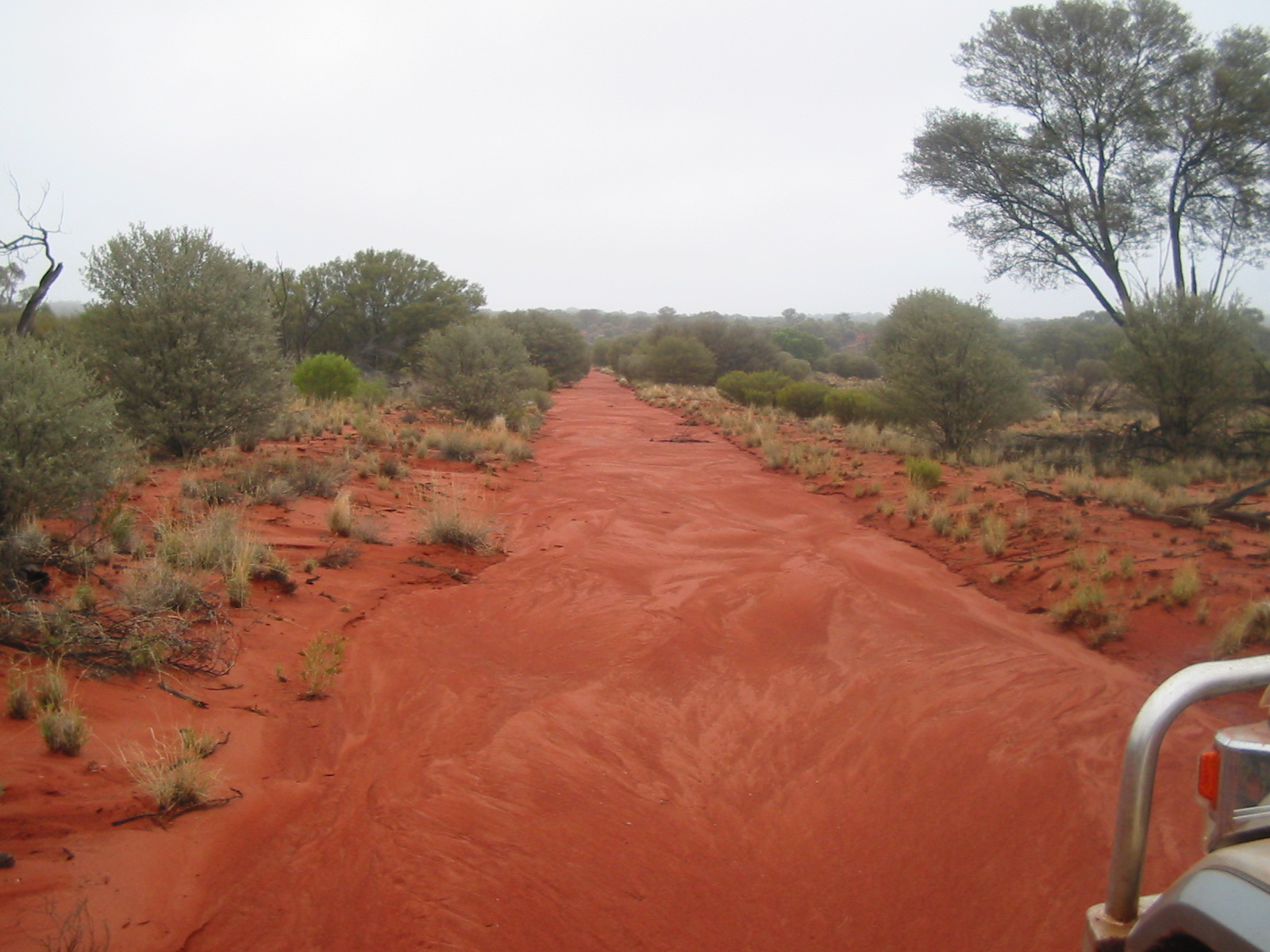
- The Anne Beadell Highway in South Australia. Heavy rain has washed out corrugations
- Coordinates: 28.621174°S 122.418494°E (West end); 29.019122°S 134.721836°E (East end)

General information
- Type: Track
- Length: 1,325 km (823 mi)

Major junctions
- West end: Laverton–Leonora Road; Laverton, Western Australia
- Connie Sue Highway
- East end: Stuart Highway; Coober Pedy, South Australia

Location(s)
- Region: Goldfields–Esperance (WA), Eyre Western, Far North (SA)

Restrictions
- Permits: 4 required
- Fuel supply: Ilkurlka 28.350412°S 127.518027°E
- Facilities: Ilkurlka

Anne Beadell Highway is an outback unsealed track linking Coober Pedy, South Australia, and Laverton, Western Australia, a total distance of 1,325 km (823 mi). The track was surveyed and built by Len Beadell, Australian surveyor, who named it after his wife.

The track passes through remote arid deserts and scrub territory of South Australia and Western Australia, which often have summer temperatures approaching 50 °C (122 °F). Sand dunes predominate for most of the track.

== Map and overview ==
The Anne Beadell Highway (in purple). Map details as of 1972

The road was constructed to provide access for a series of surveys, adding to the overall geodetic survey of unexplored parts of Australia. The information was required for rocket range projects at Woomera. Construction was completed in five stages, spanning nine years from 1953 to 1962. The first stage from Mabel Creek station near Coober Pedy, west towards Emu Field, was built in February and March 1953 to provide access for British atomic tests at Emu Field. This stage preceded the formation of Beadell's Gunbarrel Road Construction Party and was the first road built by Beadell.

The second stage was begun in July 1957 in the reverse direction, from Anne's Corner towards Emu Field, after Beadell had completed the Mount Davies Road in the north-west of South Australia. The third stage started in August 1961, running westward from Anne's Corner to Vokes Hill. In April 1962 the fourth stage proceeded west from Vokes Hill, beyond Serpentine Lakes towards the future Neale Junction where the construction party arrived in August.

From Neale Junction during August and September 1962, the north–south Connie Sue Highway was constructed between Warburton and Rawlinna. The fifth stage of the Anne Beadell Highway was then commenced and was completed at Yamarna near Lake Yeo when it joined an existing track to Laverton in November 1962.

Beadell put considerable effort into rediscovering Vokes Hill while surveying the track, as a new device called a Tellurometer was being introduced. It used radio waves for distance measurement, and required elevated points for its operation.

== Fuel and supplies ==
The track is suitable for only well-provisioned and experienced four-wheel drivers. There are no settlements between Coober Pedy and Laverton.

A roadhouse named Ilkurlka in Western Australia, opened in 2003, is 167 km (104 mi) west of the Western Australia – South Australian state border. It is at the intersection of the Madura Loongana Track (Aboriginal Business Road) and the Anne Beadell Highway. The roadhouse caters mainly for local Aboriginal communities and may be the most isolated roadhouse in Australia. There are no resupply stops on the 780 km (480 mi) journey between Ilkurlka and Coober Pedy.

== Places of interest ==
Neale Junction, where the Anne Beadell Highway intersects with the Connie Sue Highway, another outback track constructed by Len Beadell, is 172 km (107 mi) west of Ilkurlka.

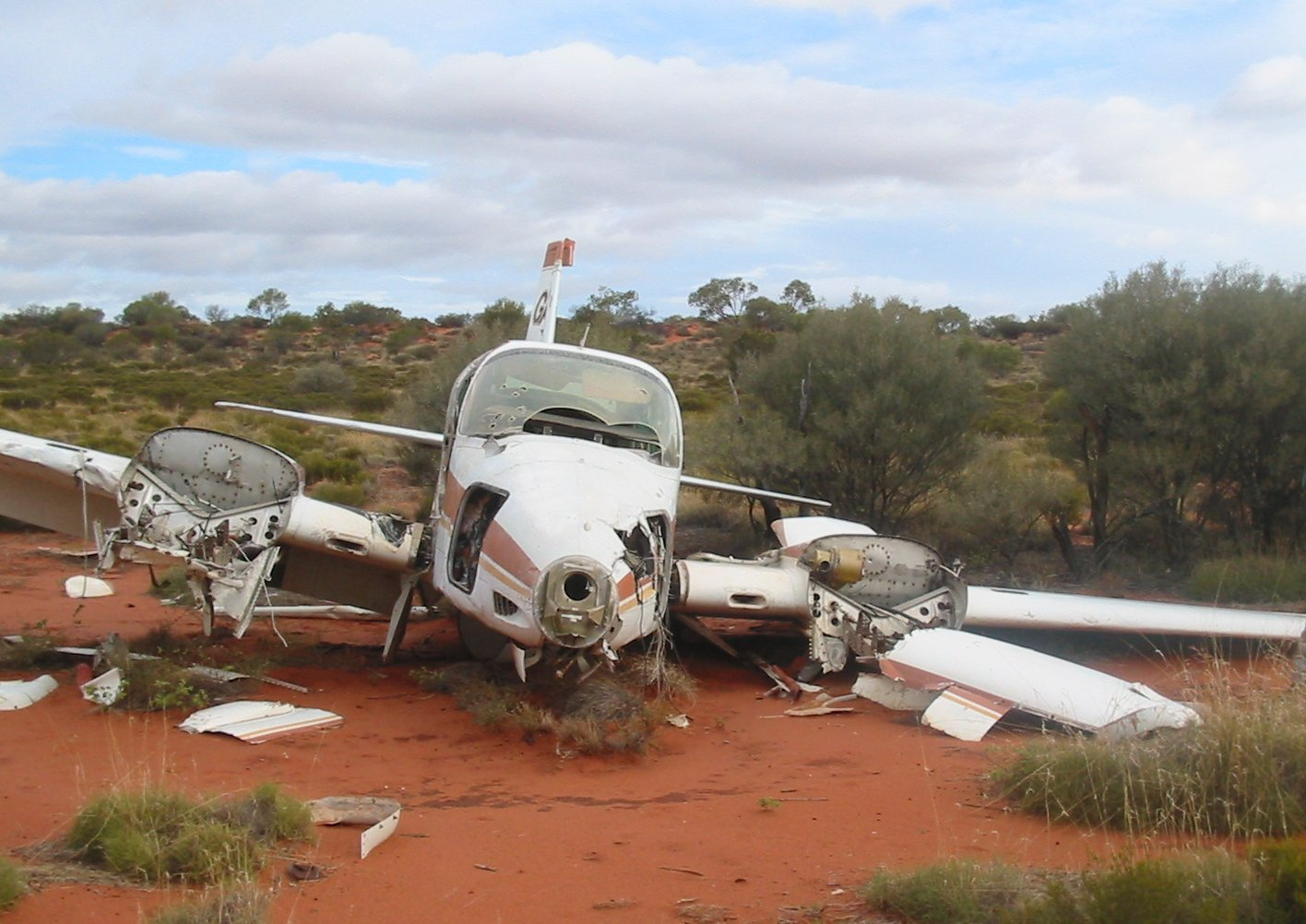
This plane wreck provides a sudden change in scenery on an isolated road (28°16′24.38″S 126°58′17.72″E)

The track passes through the former British atomic test site of Emu Field, rabbit and dog fences, restricted nature conservation areas, and Aboriginal lands, all of which require permits to pass through.

Of interest is the wreck of a light aircraft near the track in Western Australia. The road passes through Mamungari Conservation Park in South Australia, which is one of Australia's fourteen World Biosphere Reserves and the Tallaringa Conservation Park.

== Conditions ==
Because the track is remote and not signposted, satellite navigation is advisable. For communication, high frequency radio or satellite telephone are recommended. In good conditions, it may take five days to complete the journey. Hazards such as flat tyres, breakdowns, and occasional flash floods must be taken into account.

== Major intersections ==
State/Territory	LGA	Location	km	mi	Destinations	Notes
Western Australia	Laverton	Laverton	0	0.0	Great Central Road (Outback Highway) – Leonora	Western terminus of highway
Western Australia	Laverton	Neale Junction	373	232	Connie Sue Highway – Warburton, Rawlinna	
State border			710	440	Western Australia – South Australia state border	
South Australia	Maralinga Tjarutja	Vokes Hill Corner	880	550	Vokes Hill Corner to Cook Road – Cook	
South Australia	Maralinga Tjarutja	Anne's Corner	985	612	Mount Davies Road – Pipalyatjara	
South Australia	Maralinga Tjarutja	Emu Field	1,035	643	Maralinga to Emu Road – Maralinga	
South Australia	Coober Pedy	Coober Pedy	1,325	823	Stuart Highway (A87) – Alice Springs, Port Augusta, Adelaide	Eastern terminus of highway
1.000 mi = 1.609 km; 1.000 km = 0.621 mi: Route transition

== See also ==
- Gunbarrel Road Construction Party
- Highways in Australia
- List of highways in South Australia
- List of highways in Western Australia
