= Gary Junction Road =

Track in the Northern Territory and Western Australia

Gary Junction Road Northern Territory–Western Australia
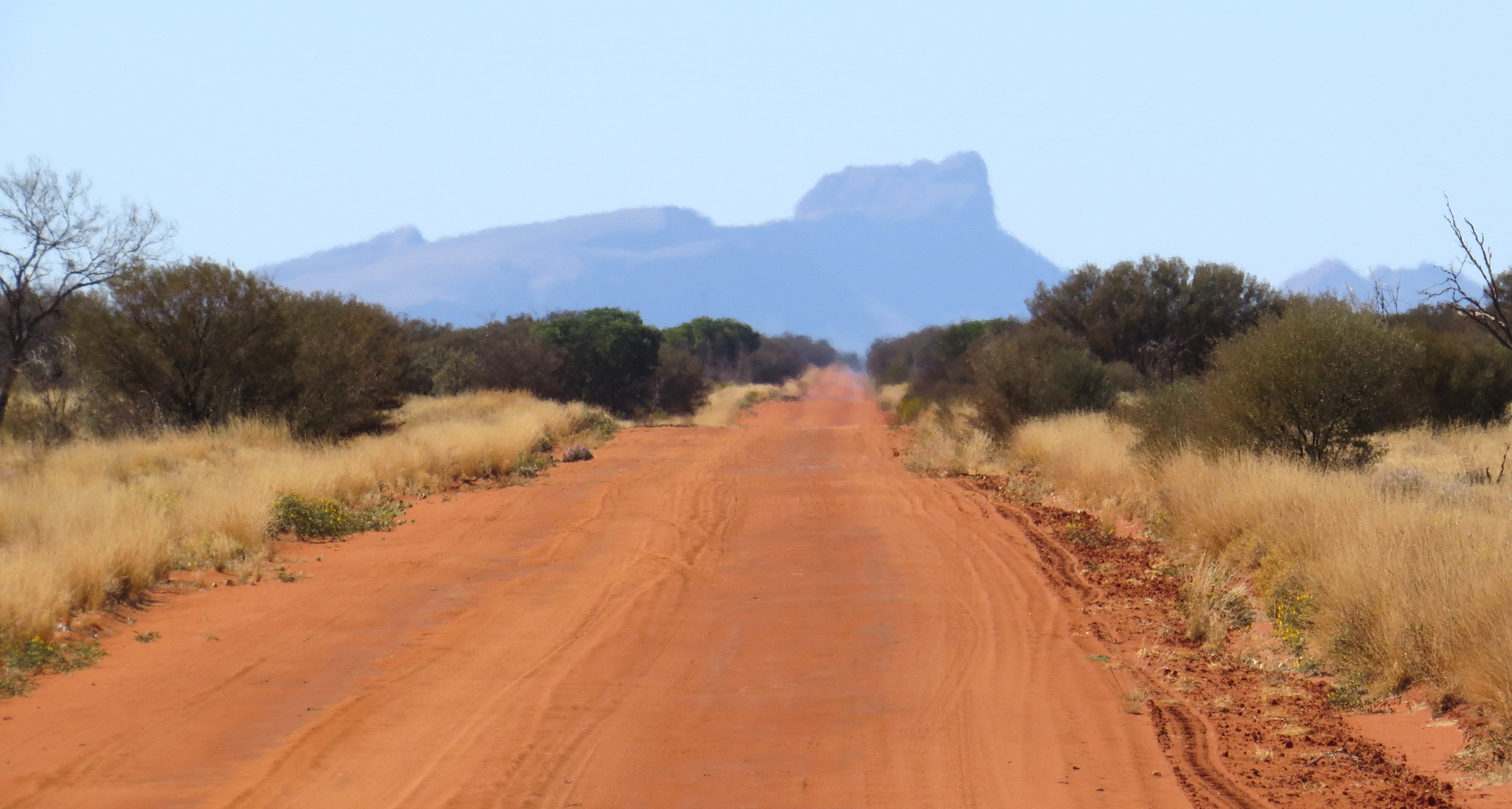
- Looking east along Gary Junction Road towards Mt Liebig

General information
- Type: Track
- Length: 852 km (529 mi)
- Built by: Len Beadell

Major junctions
- ESE end: Tanami Road
- WNW end: Gary Junction

Restrictions
- Permits: 3
- Fuel supply: Papunya, Kintore, Kiwirrkurra, Kunawaritji
- Facilities: Bore water, Jupiter well

The Gary Junction Road is an outback unsealed road in Australia built by Len Beadell in the 1960s as part of a network of roads for the Weapons Research Establishment at Woomera, South Australia. In its original form, the Gary Junction Road ran from Liebig bore in the Northern Territory to Callawa Station in Western Australia. On present day maps, it is depicted as running from the Tanami Road (Narwietooma turnoff) to Gary Junction, just east of the Canning Stock Route, a distance of 852 kilometres. The road was named after Beadell's only son Gary.

Map of the original Gary Junction Road 1350 km in length.

== History ==
Beadell and his Gunbarrel Road Construction Party (GRCP) commenced work immediately after completing the Sandy Blight Junction Road in August 1960. Starting from Sandy Blight Junction, the first stage was built towards an existing bore track near Mount Liebig 180 km to the east (67 km west of Papunya). Liebig bore was reached on 16 September. The party then returned to Sandy Blight Junction to continue the western section, with the ultimate goal being Callawa Station near the north-west coast of Western Australia.

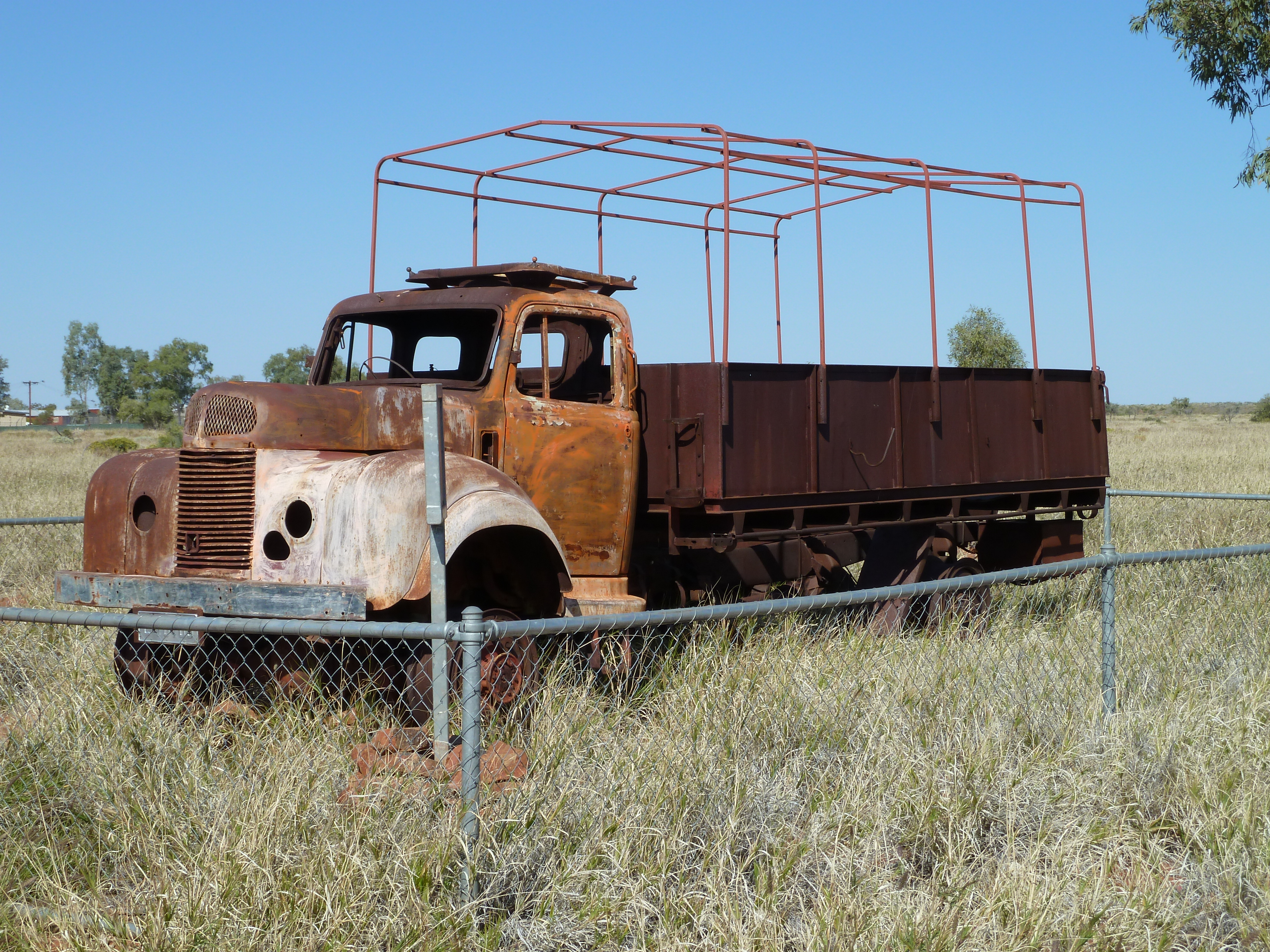
Beadell's burnt out ration truck at Kiwirrkurra Community on the Gary Junction Road

Construction west of the junction began on 5 October, and the border between the Northern Territory and Western Australia was reached on 12 October. Beadell took star sights and placed a signpost displaying the latitude and longitude to mark the border. The road progressed westward and reached the present site of Jupiter Well on 7 November. The location was about 330 km from Sandy Blight Junction. On 8 November the grader broke down with a major transmission failure. Further road making was interrupted, and a lengthy towing operation of 800 km back to Giles began, using the bulldozer to tow the grader, with the water trailer attached behind it. The average speed of the bulldozer train was 3 km per hour, with an estimate of about a month for the journey. Every two hours while the bulldozer was travelling, a halt for greasing the track rollers was required.

Towing had barely begun when the cook's ration truck with all of its supplies caught fire and was burnt out on 12 November. Beadell was forced to make an emergency trip to Alice Springs to obtain replacement food, a return trip of around 3000 km. Meanwhile, the towing operation continued, and the team was reunited 10 km west of Sandy Blight Junction. The slow moving convoy reached Giles on 26 November 1960.

Completion of the Gary Junction Road was delayed by more than two years, and recommenced in 1963 after the GRCP had built the south to north Gary Highway. Construction began on 18 May 1963 from Gary Junction east towards Jupiter Well to link up with the earlier stage. The road progressed to within a few kilometres of the well, but a large sand dune blocked the way. By using the Land Rover as an anchor, a four-wheel drive truck attached to a long winch cable was able to get up the dune, and the remaining vehicles were successively winched, including lastly the grader. A bulldozer was not part of the road making operation at this time. Jupiter Well was reached on 25 May 1963.

== Callawa track ==
Beadell and the GRCP returned to Gary Junction, and on 4 July started work on a road from there 45 km north-west to intercept the Canning Stock Route at Well 35 (Minjoo). After crossing the stock route, they continued through the Great Sandy Desert battling sand dunes and the salt Percival Lakes to join an existing track at Callawa Station. The connection was made 21 July, and although Beadell preferred the name Gary Junction Road, the track became known as the Callawa track to the west of Well 35. The total distance constructed from Mount Liebig to Callawa was 1350 kilometres.

== Supplementary details ==
A new road between Gary Junction and Well 33 was built by Mike Jenkins and is shown on maps as the Jenkins Track. It is 70 km from Gary Junction to Kunawaritji or Well 33 via the track. A road, part of which is called the Telfer Road, now connects Kunawaritji to Port Hedland on the west coast, via Lake Auld and Marble Bar, thus completing a direct link from the west to Alice Springs.

The position at which the grader's transmission failed was to become known as Jupiter Well (22°52′21″S 126°35′59″E). The well was dug by a survey crew from the National Mapping Council in August 1961, and was named after the planet Jupiter when a member of the survey party noticed a reflection of the planet in the still waters of the well at night.

The Callawa Track had a short functional life, as it was replaced soon after by the Wapet Road (or Kidson Track), and has now become overgrown. Recent maps no longer depict the track. In August 2004, Connie Sue Beadell and mother Anne led a party of eight vehicles along the original Callawa track. Apart from the extensive preparation required beforehand, a fuel drop was necessary at the halfway point. Connie said "The tyres were another issue entirely. The party had a total of 70+ punctures for the whole trip, bearing in mind that 5 of the 8 vehicles that started did not finish the entire distance." The Wapet Road joins the Great Northern Highway near Eighty Mile Beach.

The burnt out ration truck was relocated from its original position (22°55′33″S 128°00′53″E) to Kiwirrkurra in June 2004 and partially restored.

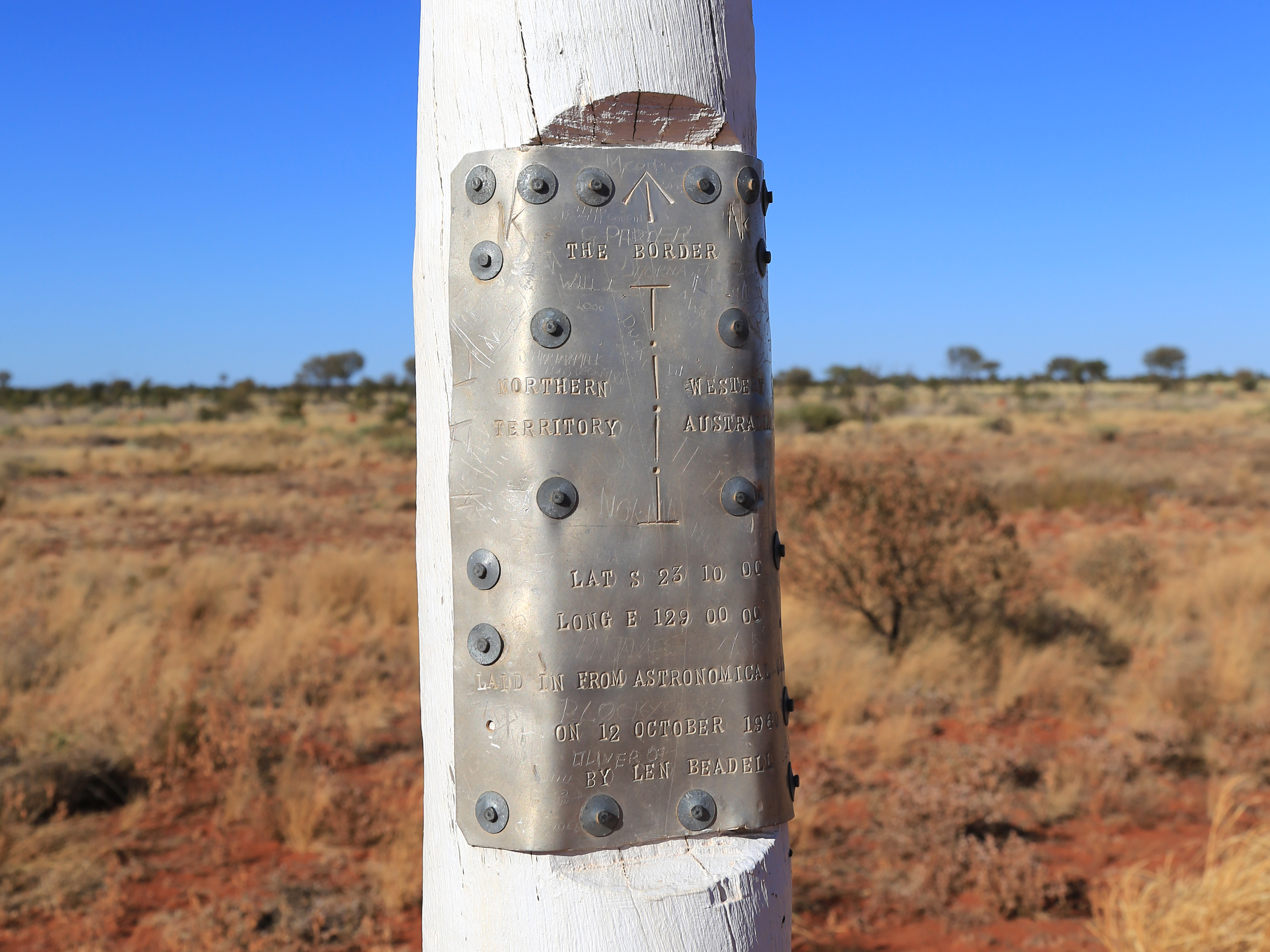
The original border post and plaque on the border of the Northern Territory and Western Australia

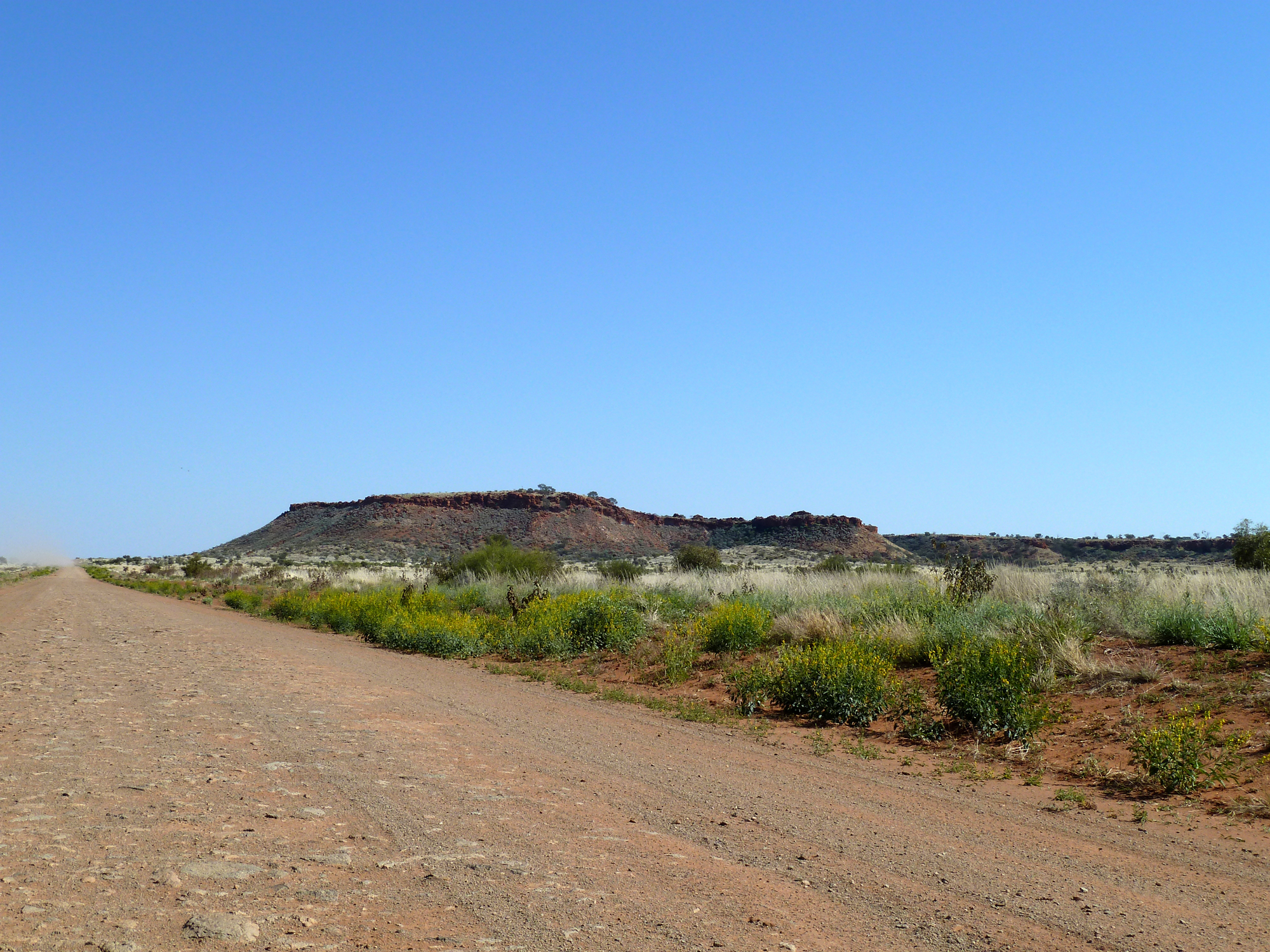
Mount Tietkens on the north side of Gary Junction Road

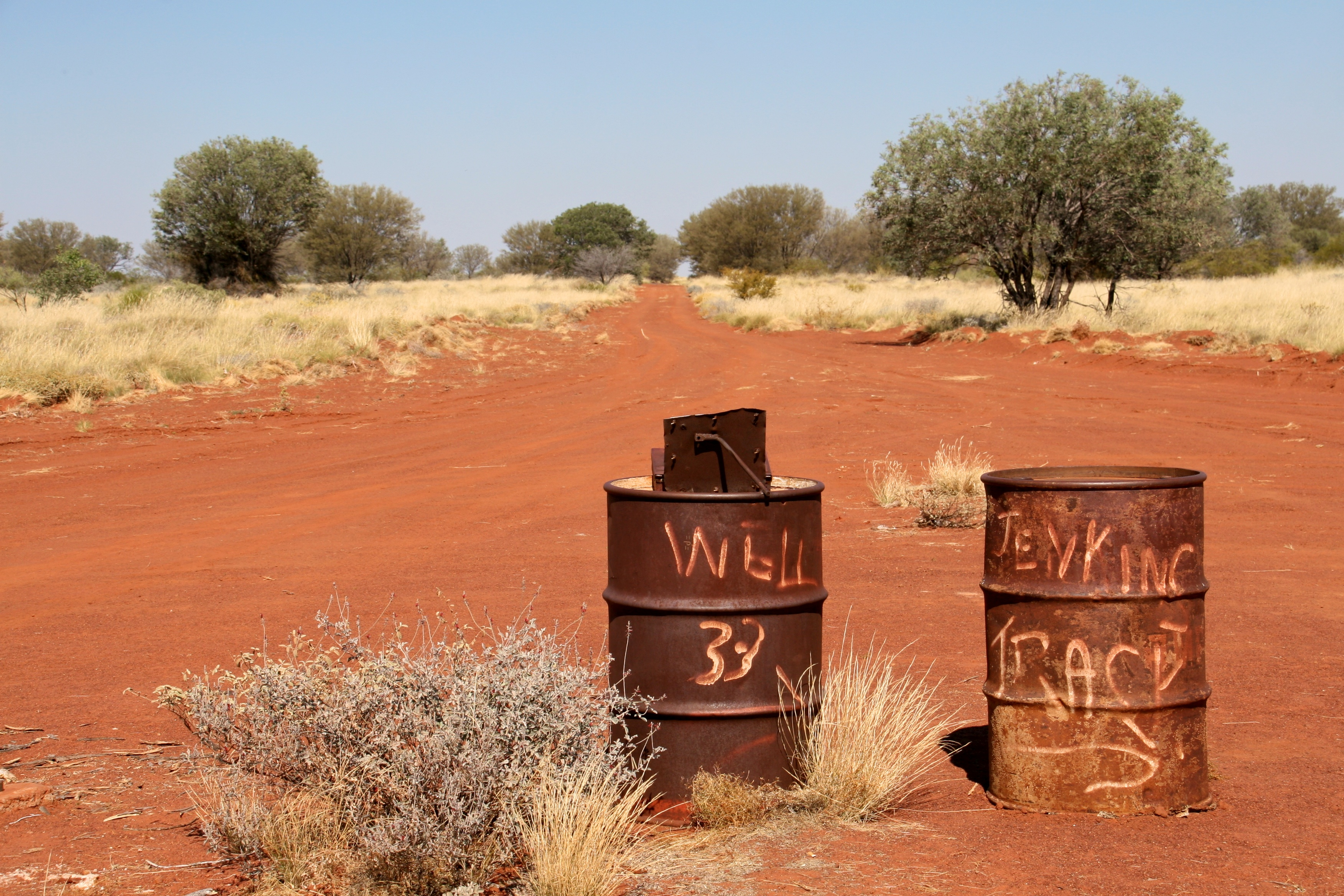
Gary Junction at the northern end of the Gary Highway looking south. The Jenkins track is to the right

== See also ==
- William Tietkens – An early explorer of the area. A mountain near the Gary Junction Road is named after him.
