= Mount Beadell =

Mountain in Western Australia

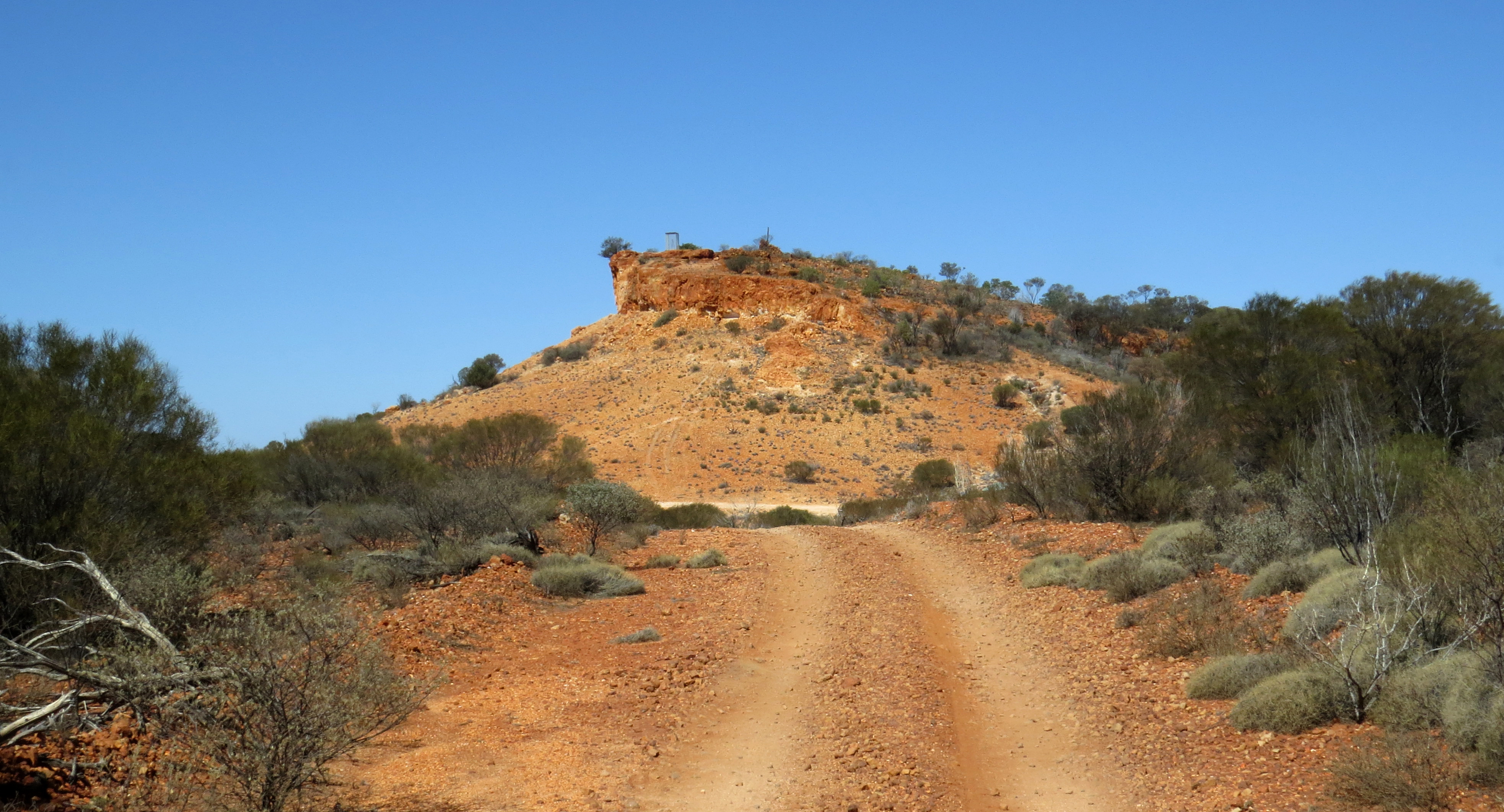
- Mount Beadell viewed from the north-west

Highest point
- Elevation: 527 m (1,729 ft)AHD
- Coordinates: 25°32′7.37″S 125°16′32.71″E

Geography
- Location within Western Australia
- Location: Western Australia, Australia

Mount Beadell (527 metres (1729 ft)) is a mountain located in the Gibson Desert region of Western Australia. It is named after surveyor and explorer Len Beadell, builder of the Gunbarrel Highway. The location is very remote being 155 km (96 mi) west of Jackie Junction and 295 km (183 mi) east of Carnegie Station, the western terminus of the original Gunbarrel Highway.

== History ==
During survey work for the Gunbarrel Highway in May 1958, Beadell found the mountain which was to bear his name. He was always on the lookout for high points in the landscape, necessary for accurate surveys. Bill Johnson, who had known Beadell since their time in the army together, recommended that the feature be named in Beadell's honour. The Surveyor General of Western Australia formally approved the name in August 1958. An official survey mark and beacon was erected on the feature in May 1959. On 12 May 1996, exactly one year after the death of Beadell, a memorial was erected on top of the mountain consisting of a replica theodolite and plaque. The ceremony was attended by about 170 people.

== See also ==
- List of mountains in Australia
