= Len Beadell =

Australian explorer (1923–1995)

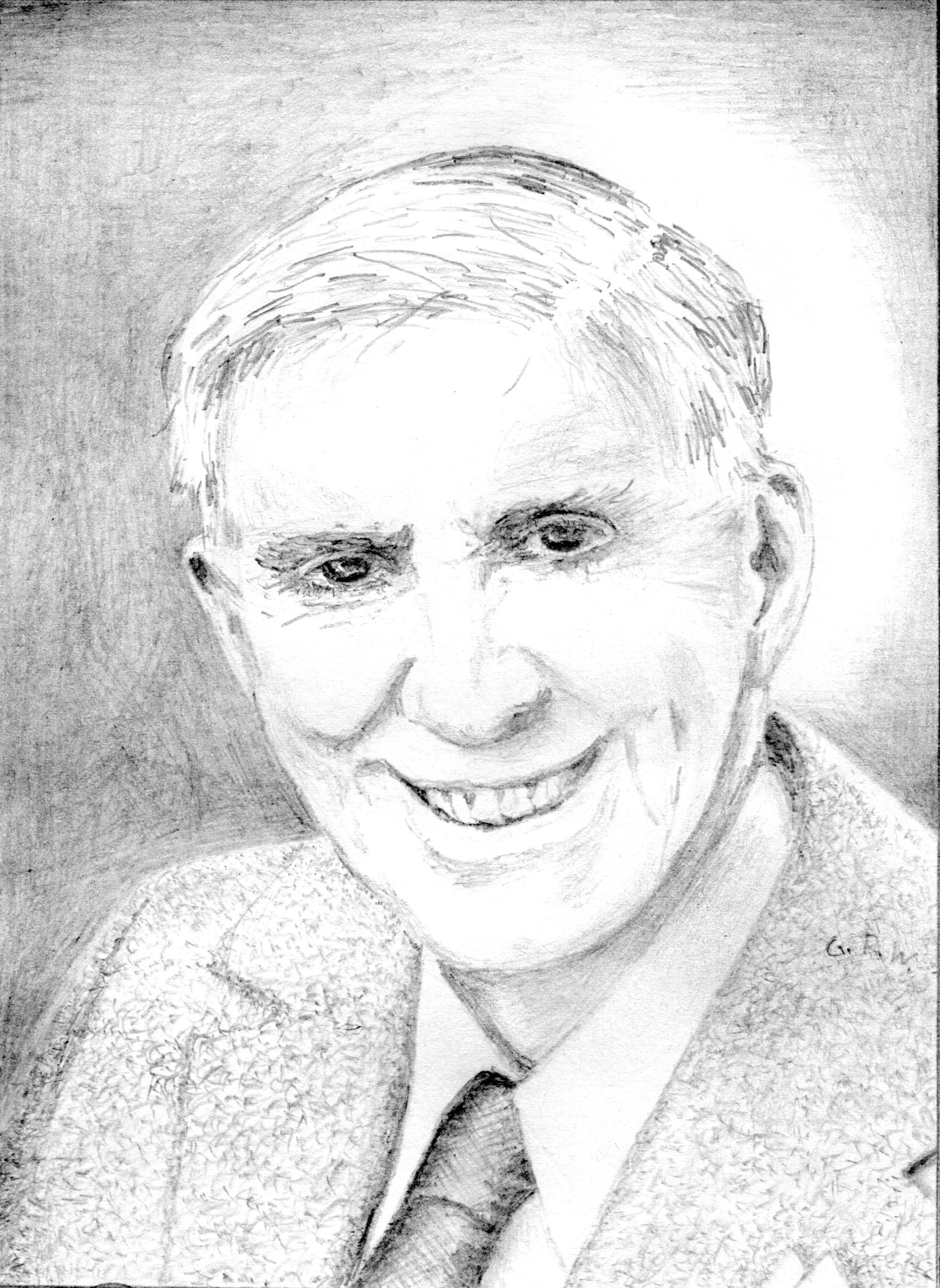
- Len Beadell OAM, BEM, FIEMS
- Born: Leonard Beadell; 21 April 1923; West Pennant Hills, New South Wales, Australia
- Died: 12 May 1995 (aged 72); Elizabeth Vale, South Australia, Australia
- Occupations: Surveyor and engineer
- Known for: Outback road building

Leonard Beadell OAM BEM FIEMS (21 April 1923 – 12 May 1995) was a surveyor, road builder, bushman, artist and author, responsible for constructing over 6,000 km (3,700 mi) of roads and opening up isolated desert areas – some 2.5 million square kilometres (970 thousand square miles) – of central Australia from 1947 to 1963. Born in West Pennant Hills, New South Wales, Beadell is sometimes called "the last true Australian explorer".

== Early life ==
Beadell's paternal grandparents came from England in the mid-1870s. His father Fred Algernon Beadell was born in Sydney and mother Viola Pearl Mackay was from Townsville. They were married in Townsville on 19 December 1914, and soon moved to the Sydney area.

A daughter Phyllis was born in 1917, followed by Len in April 1923. Beadell's primary education began at Gladesville Public School, Ryde in 1928 and continued at Burwood Public School in 1930, both suburbs of Sydney.

At the suggestion of a school friend, Beadell joined the 1st Burwood Scout Troop where he met the scoutmaster John Richmond, who was to have a major influence on Beadell's life. Richmond had served in the army during World War I, and was employed as a draughtsman and surveyor for the Metropolitan Water, Sewerage and Drainage Board in Sydney.

Between 1931 and 1941, Beadell spent most weekends on bush survey trips with other scouts and Richmond, camping and searching for old survey marks. He learnt about the technical aspects of astronomical sightings and how to use a theodolite. In 1938 with a group of six scouts, Richmond took Beadell to Lord Howe Island where they took star sightings and determined that the mapped position of the island was out by about 10 kilometres (6.2 mi) in latitude.

Beadell finished his formal education at Sydney Grammar School in 1939. He went directly to a temporary surveying position with the water board in northern New South Wales, which had been arranged by Richmond.

== War service ==
At the age of 18 in 1941, Beadell received his call up notice for the army, and was keen to enlist. The service period was specified as the length of the war, plus twelve months. His initial service in the Citizen Military Force was in the Australian Army Service Corps at Bathurst, New South Wales, where he spent most of the time driving three ton trucks. In February 1942, he was transferred to the 2nd Australian Field Survey Company, and carried out contour surveys for army maps.

In September 1942, he transferred to the Australian Imperial Force and was transferred to the 2 Aust Field Survey Section, the topographical survey and mapping unit of the New Guinea Force. In October he sailed for New Guinea serving with the survey section, renamed the 8 Aust Field Survey Section AIF in January 1943, for thirteen months. Most of 1943 was spent in the Milne Bay locality. It was here that Beadell developed his artistic skills by watching army topographical draughtsmen, whose job it was to draw maps from information supplied by surveyors. He was transferred to the 2 Section 6 Aust Topographical Survey Company AIF in Australia, returning to Sydney in November 1943 for a period of leave and further survey work in Queensland.

In January 1944 he was promoted to Corporal. In March 1945 he was back in New Guinea at Lae with the unit. The company moved by ship to Wewak where there was a large enemy presence. Their assigned tasks were to map the coastal area, and build a new airstrip. The strip was completed in August 1945, just as the war came to an end. On return to Australia in December 1945 he was posted to the 3 Aust Field Survey Company AIF in Melbourne.

== Survey exploration ==
Len opted to stay in the Army at the end of the Second World War. He was promoted to Acting/Sergeant in May 1946. The 3 Aust Field Survey Company AIF was tasked to provide survey support to a new scientific exploration in the Darwin-Katherine region of the Northern Territory. Len volunteered to delay his discharge from the Army for twelve months to be able to participate in the task. When that assignment was completed in November, he was asked once more to waive his discharge, as another project was in the making. The British and Australian governments had decided to build a rocket testing range in outback South Australia. He volunteered to be part of an Army survey team for that project, being transferred to the 5 Aust Field Survey Company, a 4 Military District Detachment, in February 1947.

The initial survey reconnaissance for the project was conducted by the Director of Military Survey and Officer Commanding 5 Aust Field Survey Company AIF in 1946. The survey detachment of ten men, under the command of Major Lindsay Lockwood who had conducted a detailed survey reconnaissance in 1946, moved in March 1947 to 'The Pines' area in what became known as the Woomera area. There they started an Army program of topographic mapping which continued until 1953, when responsibility for such surveys was transferred to the Department of the Interior. Len was promoted to Temporary/Warrant Officer Class 2 in February 1948, and elected to discharge in December 1948.

Further work was required to select and survey launching pad sites, the centreline of fire for rockets, and the airfield. The site of the future village was chosen, allowing for approach paths of the runway and natural drainage. In November 1949, he was asked to rejoin the project and began further surveying as an employee of the Long Range Weapons Establishment in August 1950. A site for the secret testing of a British atomic bomb was selected by Beadell in 1952. A road from Mabel Creek to the test site Emu Field was built by him in March 1953, his first road.

=== Gunbarrel Highway ===
Beadell's best known road is the Gunbarrel Highway, named after the Gunbarrel Road Construction Party which was assembled by him. He said he tried whenever possible to make the road as straight as a gunbarrel. The road was built with initial reconnaissance and survey by Len (not the case in 1958 when the survey reconnaissance from Warburton to Carnegie was led by the Supervising Surveyor (Geodetic) Australian Division of National Mapping, Mr HA (Bill) Johnson MBE LS FIS Aust), usually alone, pushing through raw scrub in a Land Rover.

He used a theodolite to observe the Sun or stars for latitude and longitude calculations. Once the line of the road had been decided, a bulldozer followed to cut a raw track, clearing away the spinifex and mulga scrub to form a basic level track. This was then graded using a standard road grader.

The Gunbarrel Highway was begun at Victory Downs homestead 316 km (196 mi) by road south of Alice Springs. It then pushed west to the Rawlinson Ranges, skirting south of the Gibson Desert, via the mission at Warburton, to connect to an existing road at Carnegie Station. The total distance was about 1,400 km (870 mi). Len's stories of the building of this road are told in the first of his numerous books Too Long in the Bush, a reading of which will give some insight into the incredible feat that building this road was. Len suffered near starvation, many mechanical breakdowns, countless punctures and other mishaps, all in searing desert heat, but seemingly took it all in his stride with good humour.

=== Later roads ===
Beadell's sense of humour was well known, and he referred to many of his roads as "highways". The description stuck, and maps show the subject roads as highways, despite the reality that they have degraded to single lane unsealed tracks through the remote arid areas of central Australia.

Following the Gunbarrel Highway, Len built further roads by the same method, naming most of them after his family. The Connie Sue Highway for his daughter, the Gary Highway and Gary Junction Road for his son, the Anne Beadell Highway for his wife and Jackie Junction for his youngest daughter. These roads further opened up the inhospitable country, for a variety of purposes. Beadell chose and surveyed the location for the Giles Meteorological Station and airstrip during construction of the Gunbarrel Highway.

=== Bush dentist ===
During a break from construction of the Gunbarrel Highway in June 1957, Beadell convinced a visiting dental surgeon at Woomera, Dr Bruce Dunstan, to give him a crash course on tooth extraction. Beadell had prior experience of the trouble that teeth could cause himself and his crew when days or weeks away from city facilities. This instruction and further assistance from an Alice Springs dentist, Ray Meldrum, equipped him with dental supplies and local anaesthetics sufficient for bush work. Beadell carried out his first extraction in March 1958 on Cyril Koch, a cook, during construction of the Gunbarrel Highway. By the time road building was completed in 1963, Len had pulled 29 teeth, joking that he had 29 notches on his forceps.

== Legacy ==
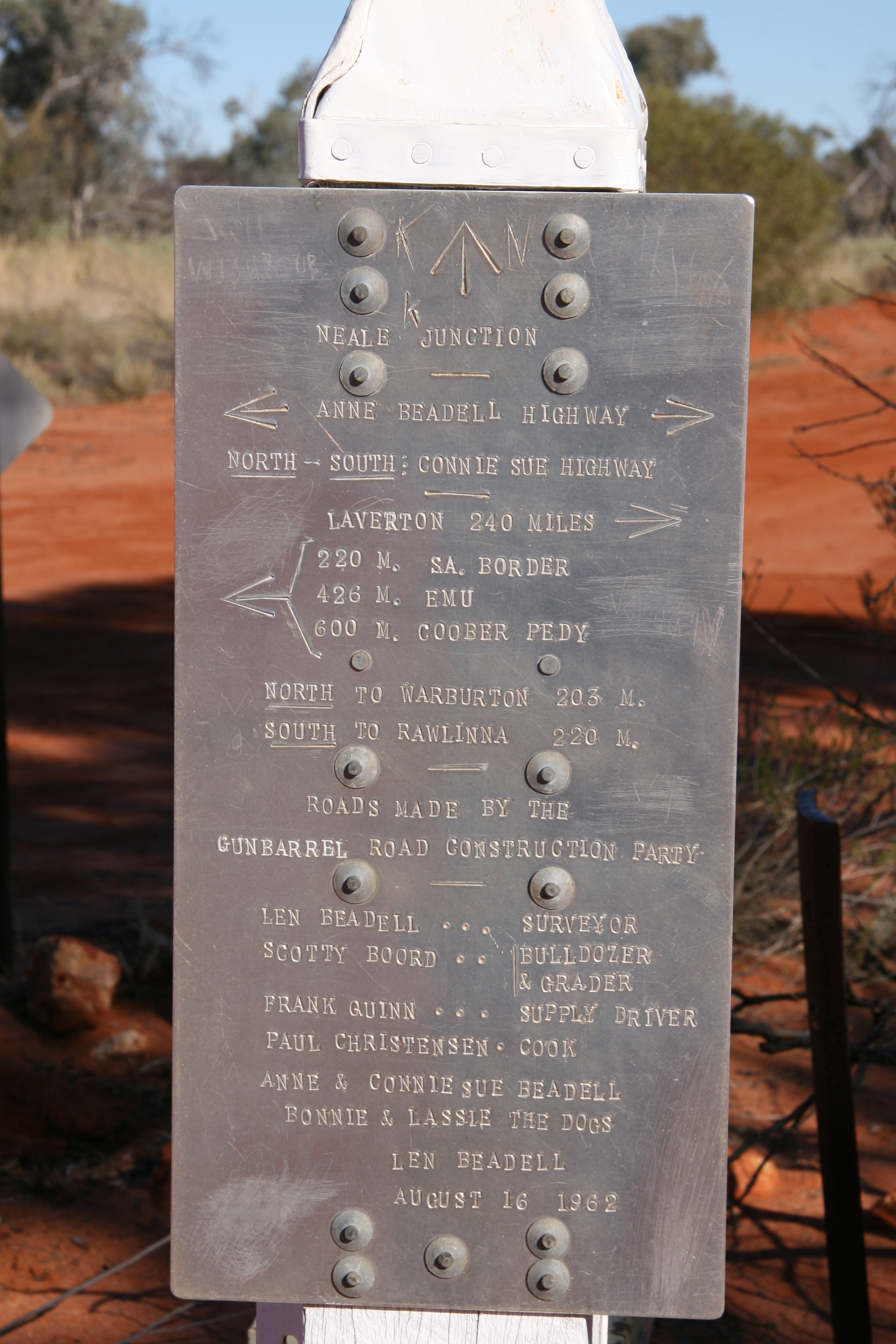
Neale Junction - a Len Beadell marker plate photographed in June 2007

Len Beadell marked "astrofixes" along his roads with aluminium plates on which latitude, longitude and other information was stamped. Many of these have sadly been taken as souvenirs; there is a program underway to replace these with replicas. Len's legacy is also to be seen on many standard Australian road maps of central desert areas, showing such things as "Len Beadell's Tree", and "Len Beadell's Burnt Out Truck". Mount Beadell in Western Australia was formally named after him by the Surveyor General of Western Australia in 1958. There is a stone cairn, memorial plaque, and a replica of his theodolite atop the mountain. (25°32′09″S 125°16′32″E)

In modern times a newer road, the Great Central Road, has superseded some of Beadell's original tracks by taking a more direct route, made possible with more modern heavy equipment. However, all of Len's original roads still exist, and are popular with hardcore four wheel drive enthusiasts. They may be difficult to negotiate and require a great deal of preparation. Almost all of them lie in aboriginal lands which require travel permits.

He was a said to be a good caricaturist and watercolour artist. He drew cartoons of staff working at Maralinga and paintings of Aboriginal people who came to the Maralinga camps.

The Beadell family sell books and memorabilia, and his daughter operates a bush tour business.

Beadell Resources, an Australian resources exploration company formed in 2007 and mostly active in remote Western Australia, named after "The Last Australian Explorer".

== Honours ==
- Len Beadell was awarded the British Empire Medal in 1957 for his work constructing the Gunbarrel Highway.
- He was awarded the Order of Australia medal in 1988 in the Queen's Birthday honours list for his "service to the Public service and to literature".
- He was a Fellow of the Institution of Engineering and Mining Surveyors, Australia, hence his postnominal, FIEMS (Aust.).
- He has an asteroid 3161 Beadell named after him, an honour bestowed because his roads led to the discovery of several important meteorites in the Australian outback.
- The Len Beadell Library, City of Salisbury, Adelaide was renamed in his honour.
- In 1994, Len was named the Australian Geographic Society's Adventurer of the Year.

== Books by Len Beadell ==
- Beadell, Len (1976). Beating about the bush. Adelaide: Rigby. ISBN 0-7270-0226-0. OCLC 5172386.
- Beadell, Len (2001) [1967]. Blast the bush. Frenchs Forest, N.S.W.: New Holland. ISBN 1-86436-736-9. OCLC 223042596.
- Beadell, Len (1971). Bush bashers. Adelaide: Rigby. ISBN 0-85179-153-0. OCLC 148179.
- Beadell, Len (1994) [1983]. End of an era. Sydney: Lansdowne Pub. ISBN 1-86302-405-0. OCLC 38352930.
- Beadell, Len (1975). Still in the bush. Adelaide: Rigby. ISBN 0-7270-0020-9. OCLC 2401985.
- Beadell, Len (1994) [1965]. Too long in the bush. Sydney: Lansdowne Pub. ISBN 1-86302-406-9. OCLC 38352847.
- Beadell, Len (1992) [1979]. Outback highways. Sydney: Weldon. ISBN 1-86302-241-4. OCLC 27620293.
- Beadell, Len (1998) [1997]. Around the world in eighty delays (2nd ed.). North Adelaide: Corkwood Press. ISBN 1-876247-01-0. OCLC 39292475.

== Books about Len Beadell ==
- A Lifetime in the Bush: A biography of Len Beadell by Mark Shephard
- Len Beadell's Legacy: Australia's Atomic Bomb and Rocket Roads by Ian Bayly
