= Frank Neale =

Australian aviator (1895–1979)

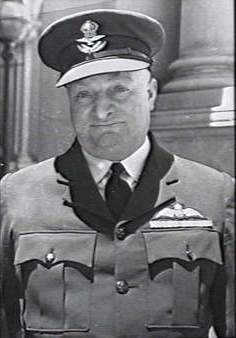
- Squadron Leader Frank Neale in 1942
- Born: 14 September 1895; England
- Died: 24 December 1979 (aged 84); Glen Huntly, Australia
- Known for: Commercial airline pilot Aerial surveys of central and western Australia
- Awards: Air Force Cross
- Aviation career
- Air force: Royal Flying Corps (1917–1918); Royal Air Force (1918–1926); Royal Australian Air Force (c. 1940–1946)
- Battles: First World War; Second World War
- Rank: Wing Commander

Frank Neale, AFC (14 September 1895 – 24 December 1979) was a British-born Australian aviator. Born in England, he served in the Royal Flying Corps and the Royal Air Force during the First World War, then moved to Australia in the mid-1920s to continue a notable career as a pioneer aviator. From 1925 until 1939 he flew thousands of hours covering most of Australia, and ventured overseas a number of times. At the outbreak of the Second World War he joined the Royal Australian Air Force Reserve, rising to wing commander and being awarded the Air Force Cross prior to his discharge in 1946.

== Early service ==
Records in the UK National Archives show Neale's home address was Thornwood, Epping, Essex with next of kin Mrs G. Neale, his mother. His occupation prior to the First World War was Mechanical and Electrical Engineer, and his initial service during the war was in the Army Service Corps Motor Transport as a probationary second lieutenant.

Neale changed to the Royal Flying Corps (RFC) as a pilot, and by the end of the war had flown numerous aircraft types including De Havilland DH4, DH6, DH9, DH9A, B.E.2E, RE8, Armstrong Whitworth F.K.8, Bristol Monoplane, Sopwith Pup, Sopwith Camel, and Avro 504. On 1 April 1918, the RFC merged with the Royal Naval Air Service (RNAS) to become the Royal Air Force, subsequently Neale's official rank became flying officer and he was an assistant Instructor at No. 1 Training Depot Station. During his time with the RFC, Neale met Australian aviator Herbert "Jim" Larkin, with whom he was later associated.

After the war ended, Neale continued with an aviation career and was issued with UK Civilian Pilots Licence No.171. In the early 1920s he set up the Essex Aviation Company with an Avro 504 at Ashingdon, Essex. At this stage he was still an officer in the RAF Reserve, which he relinquished in April 1926, after he had arrived in Australia, leaving a wife and three children in England.

== Australian career ==
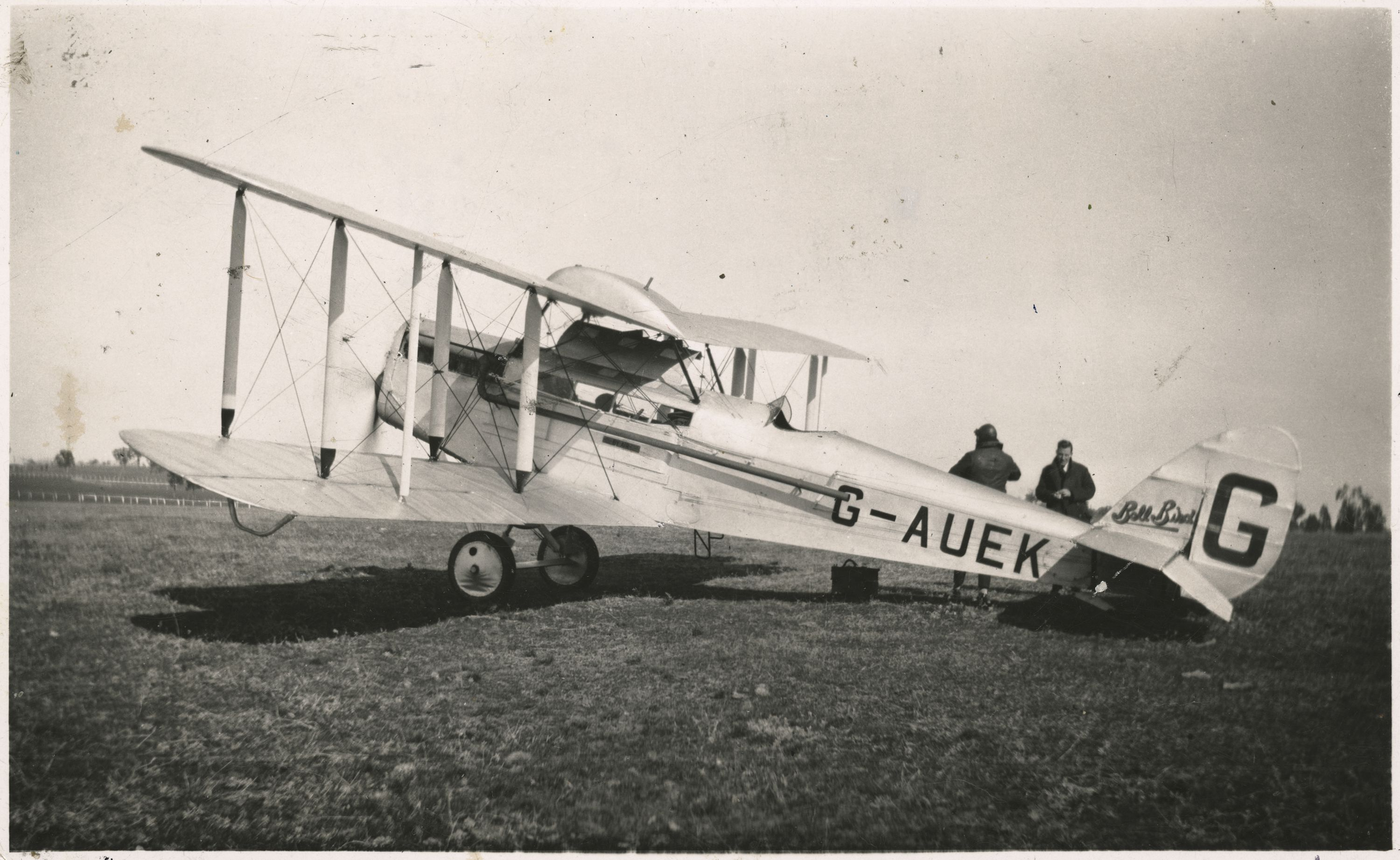
de Havilland DH.50A "Bell Bird"

Neale arrived in Australia at Fremantle (the port for Perth) on 3 February 1925 aboard the Orient liner RMS Ormonde. He had been persuaded to come to Australia by Bert Hinkler, and was contracted as a new pilot for Western Australian Airways. W.A. Airways (as it became known) had a government mail contract on the route from Geraldton to Derby via intermediate ports. Charles Kingsford Smith was one of their first employed pilots, but had left to go out on his own, and Neale filled the vacancy in the north-west of Western Australia, where the company was transitioning from the Bristol Tourer to the de Havilland DH.50.

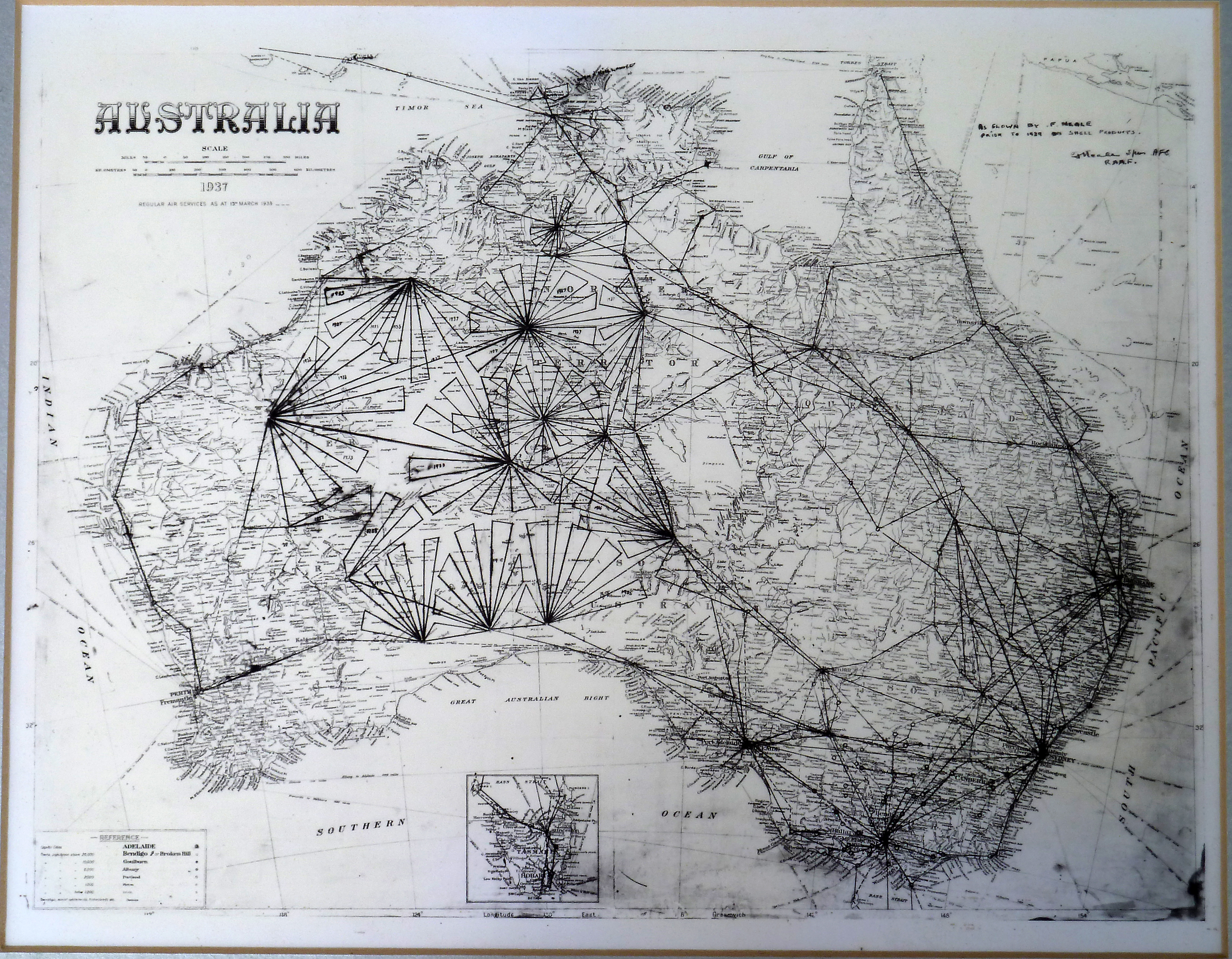
Map of flights by Frank Neale throughout Australia up until 1939

By late 1926 Neale had joined Australian Aerial Services (AAS) managed by Jim Larkin, at Essendon Aerodrome in Melbourne. Larkin identified his aircraft by naming them after Australian birds. In July 1927, Neale was the pilot of the "Satin Bird" on an inland aerial holiday flight carrying a wealthy pastoralist, W.D. Oliver. This began a regular association between Oliver and Neale in succeeding years, covering many thousands of miles on charter flights. Oliver was always on the lookout for grazing land, and one flight over the Simpson Desert proved that the sand dunes ran for hundreds of miles in a south-easterly direction.

In February 1928, Neale's aircraft the "Bower Bird", a Sopwith Wallaby, was forced down at Pialba near Maryborough, Queensland. It was carrying the manager of Hoyts cinemas to Bundaberg to meet up with Bert Hinkler after Hinkler's record breaking flight from England. Contrary to some reports at the time, the aircraft was not wrecked, but was able to be flown out a few days later. In July 1928, two AAS aircraft from Melbourne flew to Palm Valley in Central Australia on a survey flight. The "Wattle Bird" and "Love Bird" were piloted by Jim Larkin and Frank Neale, to investigate the possibility of establishing tourist flights to the area. Nothing came of it however. In 1929, Neale completed several long-distance flights in Australia on behalf of AAS, and carried W.D. Oliver on another aerial holiday in the "Sun Bird".

The Camooweal to Daly Waters service was pioneered by Frank Neale on 20 February 1930. Neale remained on that run until he went south to join Donald Mackay for a series of survey flights covering the greater part of central and western Australia. The aerial surveys were undertaken in the years 1930, 1933, 1935 and 1937. Neale was the chief pilot for all four survey flights. During this period, several new salt lakes were discovered. The largest was named Lake Mackay, and another Lake Neale. The aircraft used for the 1930 series were English built Air Navigation Experimental Company ANEC IIIs, which were converted in Australia by Larkin's Company. A small lake discovered in Western Australia was named Lake Anec after this aircraft type. In June 1930, Frank Neale became the first pilot to land an aircraft at Ayers Rock (Uluru) during one of these survey flights. The organiser of the surveys, Mackay, carried a goodwill letter with him from explorer William Tietkens who was the first person to photograph the same feature. With the onset of the Great Depression in the 1930s, Larkin's companies came under financial pressure, and Frank Neale teamed up with G.C. Matthews operating regular flights across Bass Strait to Tasmania. The aircraft in the first instance was a Saro Cutty Sark registered VH-UNV, a twin engined amphibian. It was replaced in September 1931 by a Saro Windhover with three engines. In January 1933 while flying between King Island and Melbourne, the aircraft suffered a failure of two engines forcing Frank Neale to land on the ocean and taxi 25 miles to the beach. All six occupants survived.

In the intervening years between the Mackay aerial survey flights, Neale was kept busy flying a de Havilland Dragonfly owned by Harry McEvoy, the owner of Fostar Shoe Enterprises. One flight was to China and the Far East, another to England.

== Second World War ==
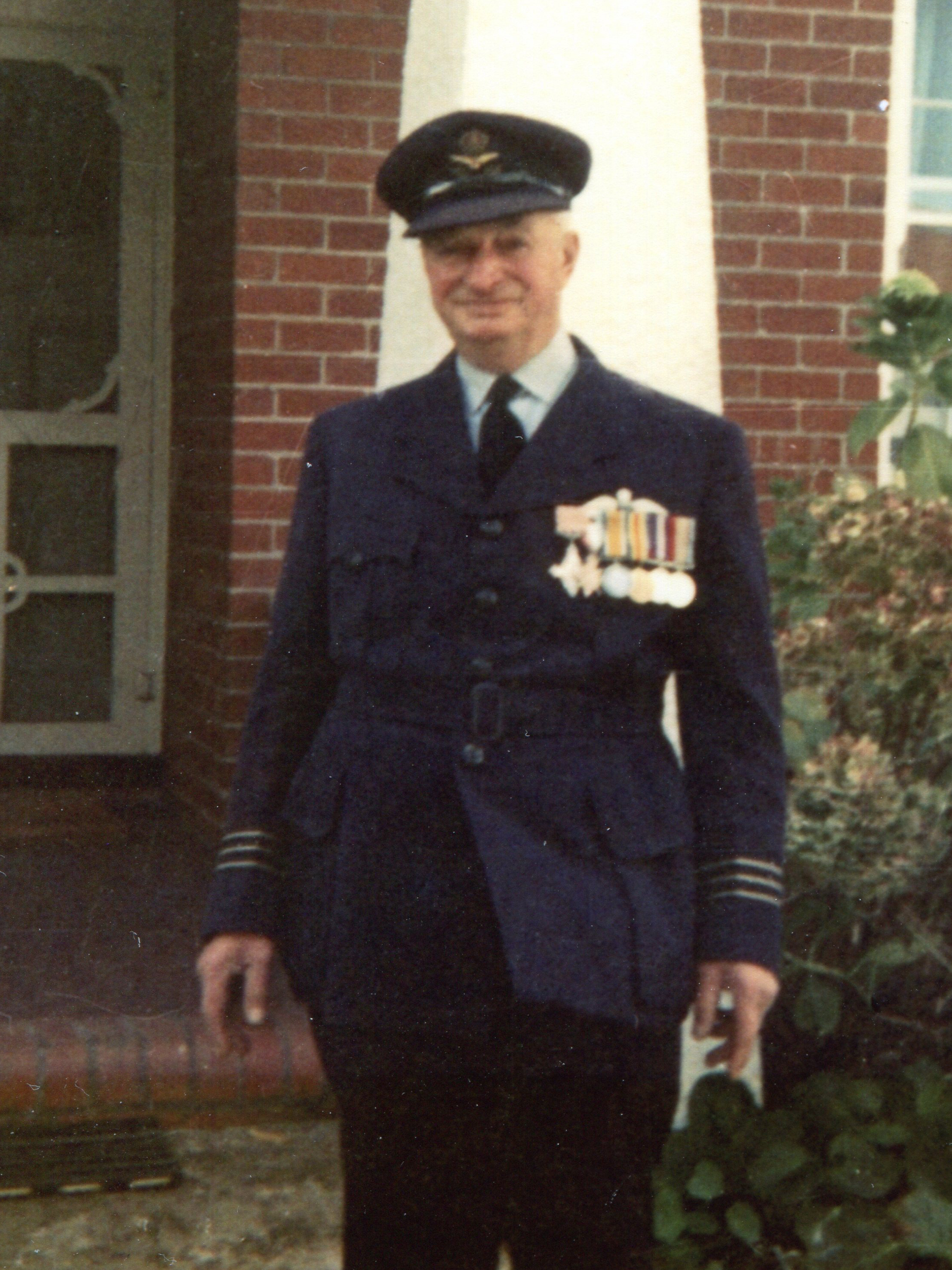
Wing Commander Frank Neale at his home in Hawson Avenue, Glen Huntly c.1976

At the outbreak of the Second World War, Neale joined the Royal Australian Air Force Reserve (RAAF) as a flying officer at No. 1 Communications Unit based in Laverton, Victoria. The unit operated a variety of aircraft for communications and transport of staff, many of which Neale personally flew. By 1941 he had been promoted to flight lieutenant, and in 1942 was a squadron leader in command of the unit. He was awarded the Air Force Cross in June 1942, and had logged 17,400 hours flying. His discharge from the RAAF was effective 11 March 1946, by which time he held the rank of wing commander. He died at his home in Glen Huntly, a suburb of Melbourne, in 1979.

== Legacy ==
- Lake Neale 24°20′30″S 130°01′30″E
- Neale Street, Darwin
- Map 1:250000 SH51-04 Neale
- Neale Junction, intersection of the Anne Beadell Highway and the Connie Sue Highway
- Neale Junction Nature Reserve
- Neale Breakaways

== See also ==
- Larkin Aircraft Supply Company
