= Handasyde H.2 =

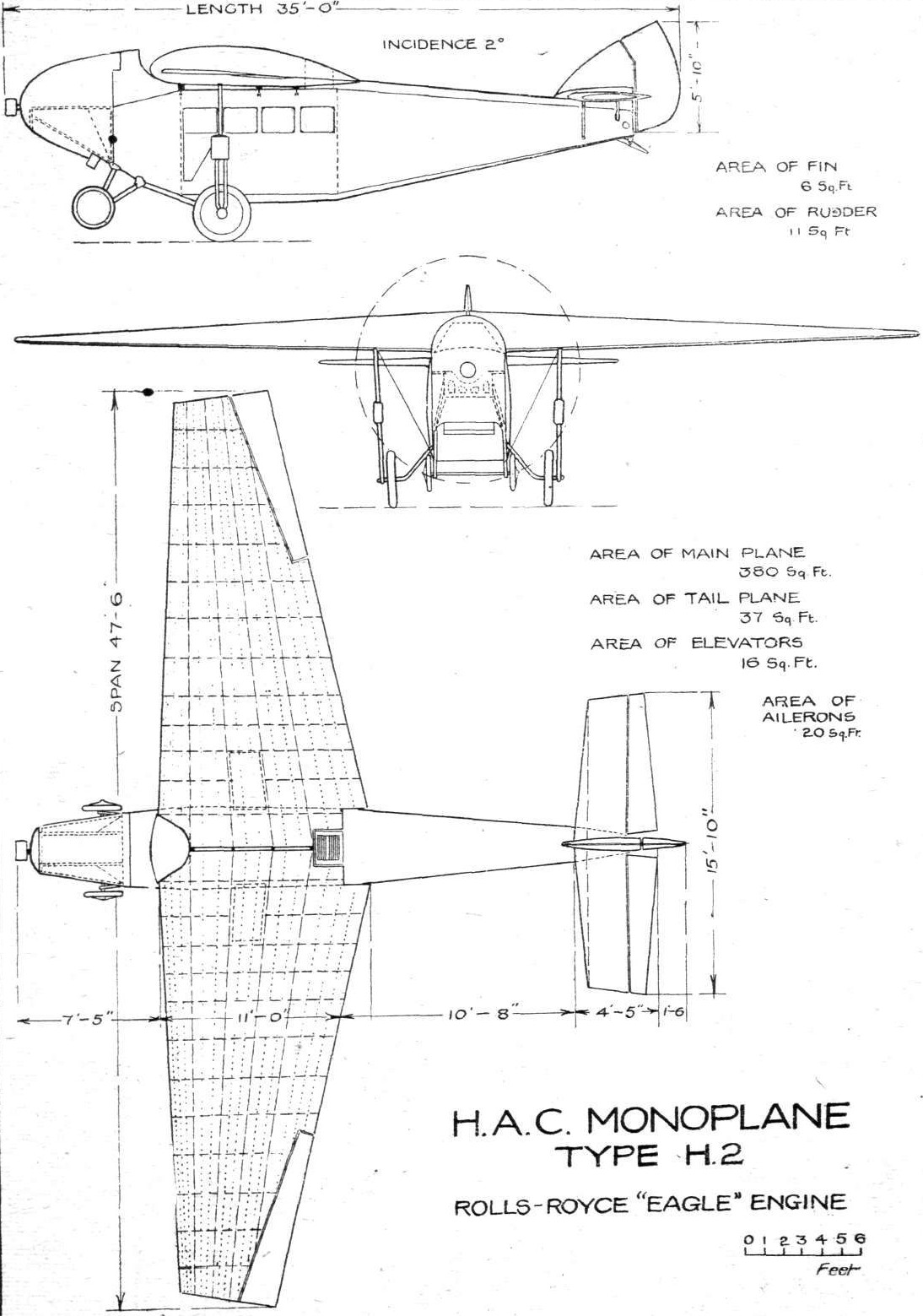
- Three-view drawing of the H.2, from 20 July 1922 issue of Flight.

General information
- Type: Six-passenger airliner
- National origin: UK
- Manufacturer: Handasyde Aircraft Co.
- Designer: George Handasyde
- Number built: 1

History
- First flight: 9 December 1922

The Handasyde H.2 was a six seat airliner built in the UK in the early 1920s. Only one was completed.

== Design and development ==
The Handasyde Aircraft Company was formed in 1921 by George Handasyde in collaboration with the ex-Martinsyde manager Hamilton Fulton. Their first product was the Handasyde glider which took part in the 1922 Itford competition. Soon after, they began the design and construction of a six passenger airliner, the Handasyde H.2.

This was a monoplane with its two-part, cantilever wing mounted on top of the fuselage. The largely wooden wing was irregularly trapezoidal in plan, thick in the centre and thinning, with a change in profile to flat-bottomed, outwards. Its four spar construction was unusual and it was spruce skinned, also unusual at the time. Ailerons extended to the wing tips, increasing in chord as they did.

The H.2 was designed to be powered by a 360 hp (270 kW), water-cooled V-12 Rolls-Royce Eagle IX engine mounted in the nose, though the only completed prototype had a 350 hp (260 kW) Eagle VII because of Handasyde's limited finances. Its honeycomb radiator was mounted underneath the cowling between the forward undercarriage struts. Behind the engine the fuselage was flat-sided and deep, with the pilot in an open cockpit recessed into the wing leading edge. The passenger cabin was behind the pilot and under the wing, entered by forward doors on each side. There were three seats on each side, each with a window; the cabin had a forward space for luggage and a toilet at the rear. In an emergency passengers could escape through a roof trapdoor at the wing trailing edge.

The completed H.2 had an almost straight-edged, broad-chord fin with a polygonal, slightly pointed, balanced rudder which reached down to the keel. Its tailplane, which could be trimmed in flight, was mounted on top of the fuselage and carried separate elevators; in plan the horizontal tail was trapezoidal.

It had an unusual four wheel undercarriage, with two mainwheels under the wings and another, smaller diameter pair under the nose. There was also a tailskid for braking on landing though, at least when it was unloaded, it rested on four wheels on the ground. The mainwheels were on cranked axles from the lower fuselage longerons, which also mounted the forward drag struts. There were vertical shock-absorber legs to the wings. The forward wheels were on a rigid axle mounted at each end on V-struts from the same longerons.

Three H.2s were ordered by the Larkin Aircraft Supply Company (LASCo) of Australia to serve routes from Adelaide to Sydney and to Brisbane. They were to be built at the old Blériot works at Addlestone by The Air Navigation and Engineering Company (ANEC). The Blériot & Spad company had changed its name in January 1918 to The Navigation Company and then to ANEC in August 1919. The first of the three H.2s flew for the first time from Brooklands on 9 December 1922, piloted by Frank Courtney. He reported that its controls were light and its handling generally good. Tests there continued into the spring of 1923, when it became apparent that the H.2 had problems which would block its Certificate of Airworthiness (CofA). Development stopped with only the prototype completed and the Handasyde concern went into liquidation early in 1924.

The H.2 cabin structure, landing gear and Eagle VIII engine mountings were incorporated into the 1926 ANEC III. This was a biplane and was about 30% longer though still a six-seater; three were used in Australia by LASCo.

== Specifications ==
Data from Les Ailes, June 1923

General characteristics

- Crew: One
- Capacity: six passengers
- Length: 34 ft 11 in (10.64 m)
- Wingspan: 51 ft 10 in (15.8 m)
- Wing area: 450 sq ft (42 m^{2})
- Gross weight: 5,000 lb (2,268 kg) designed
- useful load: 1,200–1,500 lb (540–680 kg)
- Powerplant: 1 × Rolls-Royce Eagle IX water-cooled V-12 at 1,080 rpm, 360 hp (270 kW)
- Propellers: 2-bladed

Performance

- Maximum speed: 115 mph (185 km/h, 100 kn) lowest estimate
