= Lake Neale =

Body of water in Northern Territory, Australia

Lake Neale (Pantu)

- Location within Northern Territory
- Location: Petermann, Northern Territory
- Coordinates: 24°15′00″S 129°52′00″E
- Type: Salt lake
- Basin countries: Australia
- Max. length: 64 km (40 mi)
- Surface area: 300 km^{2} (120 sq mi)
- Surface elevation: 457 m (1,499 ft)

Lake Neale (together with Lake Amadeus, Pitjantjatjara: Pantu ("salt lakes")) is a salt lake in the southwest corner of the Northern Territory of Australia. It is on the north-western side of Lake Amadeus. The two lakes form part of a chain of salt lakes that stretches about 500 km (310 mi), from Lake Hopkins in the west to the Finke River in the east. This drainage basin is known as the Amadeus Basin. The lake is usually a dry salt pan, and only holds water for short periods after heavy rainfall. Lake Neale is on Aboriginal land, held in the Petermann Aboriginal Land Trust. The Haasts Bluff lands are nearby to the north.

== Description ==
Lake Neale was named after Frank Neale, one of the pilots of an aerial expedition to accurately survey the desert regions northwest of Alice Springs in 1930. Neale flew one of the two planes that had been hired by explorer Donald Mackay for the expedition. The team made 15 survey flights over 24 days, in which they mapped the dimensions of Lakes Amadeus and Neale and found the even larger Lake Mackay, further to the north.

The first European to see Lake Neale was the explorer Ernest Giles in 1872. He was travelling towards Kata Tjuta after sighting the peak from a distance, but Lake Amadeus blocked his path. He sighted Lake Neale when he tried to reach Mount Unapproachable, on the northern side of the lake. He was coming from the east, and did not notice a land bridge between Neale and Amadeus, mistaking them as the one lake. William Tietkens corrected this mistake in an expedition of his own seventeen years later.
