= Donald George Mackay =

Australian outdoorsman, long-distance cyclist and explorer

- Born: 29 June 1870; Yass, New South Wales, Australia
- Died: 17 September 1958 (aged 88); Sutherland Shire Hospital, Sydney, Australia
- Occupations: Outdoorsman, explorer, cyclist

Donald George Mackay CBE (29 June 1870 – 17 September 1958) was an Australian outdoorsman, long-distance cyclist, and explorer who conducted several expeditions to the remotest areas of the Australian continent.

== Early life ==
Donald George Mackay was born on 29 June 1870 at Yass, New South Wales, son of Alexander Mackay, owner of Wallendbeen station, and his wife Annie. Mackay was educated at Wallendbeen Public School and at Oaklands School, Mittagong. After a brief engineering apprenticeship he worked for his father until the latter's death in 1890. During 1890-99 Mackay travelled extensively abroad, and later prospected for gold in western New South Wales.

== Cycling expedition around Australia ==
In July 1899 Mackay belatedly joined brothers Alex and Frank White to become the first men to travel around the continent of Australia on a bicycle. Mackay's 24-in. frame, 29 lb. DUX bicycle was especially strengthened to carry Mackay's weight plus his gear, which included two water cans, a set of tools and bicycle parts, a camera, waterproof rain cloak, diary, food bag, and revolver.

Though Frank White had to abandon the attempt due to mechanical problems, Alex White and Donald Mackay successfully completed the circuit of the Australian continent and returned to Brisbane in March 1900. Though he came in third behind Alex White and Arthur Richardson, he set a record-breaking time of 240 days after an 11,500-mile (17,703 km) ride. On 27 June, Mackay was given a silver presentation trophy valued at 26 guineas (£27 6s) by the Dunlop Tyre Company "in recognition of his meritorious cycle ride around Australia."

== Later explorations ==
Mackay married Amy Isabel Little on 16 April 1902 at Homebush, Sydney. Their home at Port Hacking was on an estuary, facilitating the couple's love of fishing and sailing. Mackay led and financed an expedition to Papua in 1908 to investigate the headwaters of the Purari River. During the following decade he sailed a yacht in the South Pacific, visiting New Zealand and the Dutch East Indies.

In 1926 Mackay financed and accompanied the first of several expeditions to Australia's Northern Territory. During the first expedition, which utilized camel transport, Mackay accompanied anthropologist Dr Herbert Basedow to the Petermann Ranges. In 1928 they explored Arnhem Land.

=== Aerial survey 1930 ===
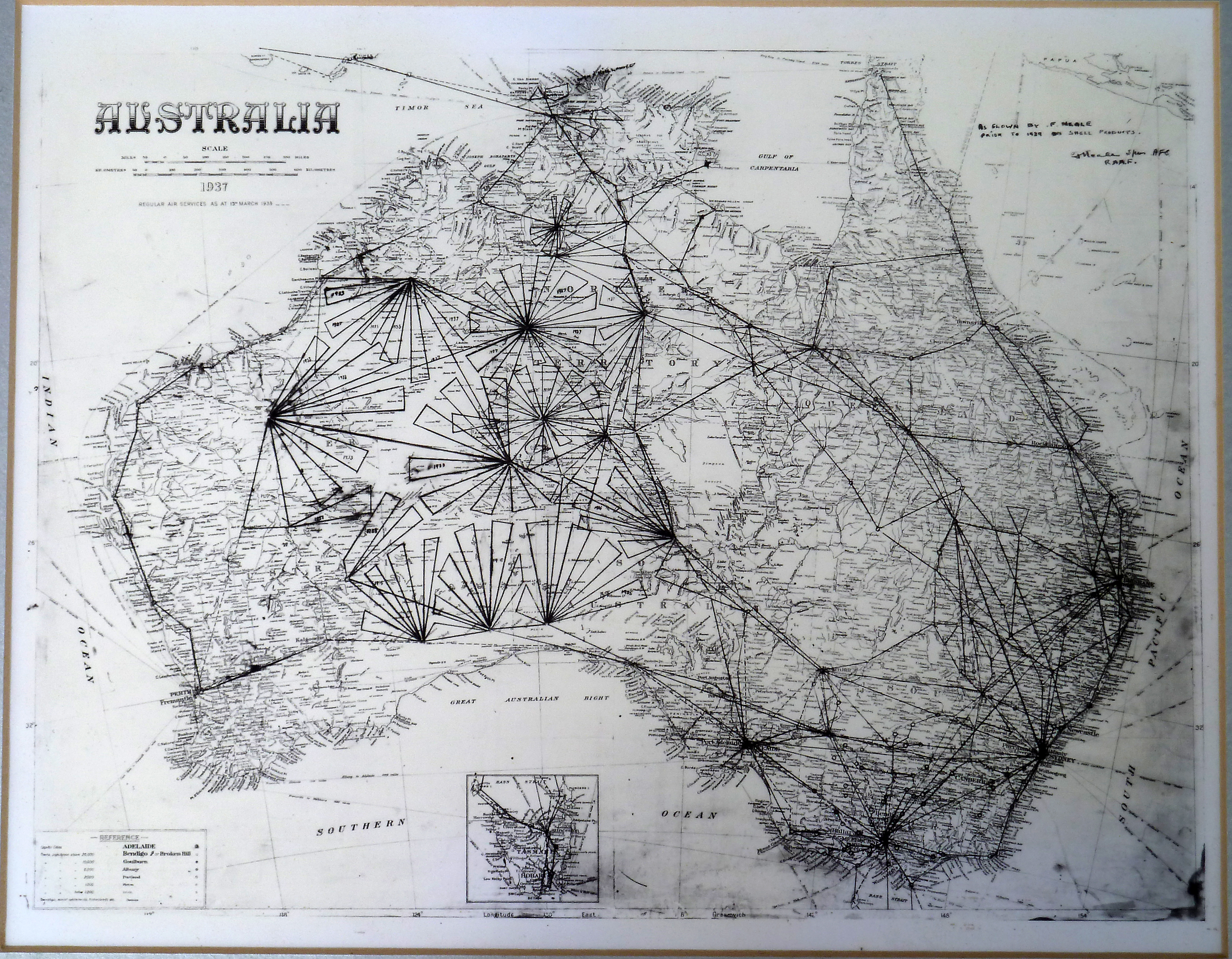
Map of flights by Frank Neale, including those for the Mackay aerial exploration of Central and Western Australia

Beginning in 1930, Mackay supervised several aerial survey expeditions to Central Australia. The 1930 expedition surveyed the south-western corner of the Northern Territory. Mackay utilised two ANEC III aircraft for the survey, piloted by Captain Frank Neale and Captain H. B. Hussey, with Commander Harry T. Bennett as the navigator and surveyor. The team employed Bob Buck, a well known bushman of Central Australia, to establish a base in the Ehrenberg Range west of Alice Springs. Buck set out with a camel team two months prior to the survey party to take fuel and supplies to the base known as Ilbilba (also spelt Ilbpilla). Using the base as the hub of an imaginary wheel, Commander Bennett had the aircraft fly directly outbound for 250 miles, turn to fly the short side of a triangle, then fly directly inbound to the base making another 250-mile spoke of the wheel. The party made 15 survey flights over 24 days covering an area of 67,000 square miles, mapping and correcting the dimensions of Lake Amadeus and finding a previously unknown to them Lake Mackay,(22°36′S 128°42′E) the second largest lake in Australia. Lake Anec to the west-north-west of Lake Hopkins was named after the aircraft type. The expedition finished at Adelaide on 28 June 1930.

=== Aerial survey 1933 ===
The second series of surveys began from Sydney 20 May 1933 using a new aircraft, the Percival Gull bought by Donald Mackay especially for the flights. It was a fast low winged monoplane designed by Australian Edgar Percival, but built in England. Once again Bob Buck with 50 camels set out early to Docker Creek (now Docker River) in the Petermann Ranges, which was to be the new base early in the series. A backup aircraft was a Gipsy Moth piloted by Clive James Robertson with wireless operator Kingsley Love as crew. In early July, there was great concern at the Docker Creek base when Mackay and Neale in the Percival Gull failed to return from a flight to Lake Anec. The backup Gipsy Moth with Robertson and Bennett aboard began a search and discovered the missing aircraft bogged on the edge of the salt lake. The rescue crew were guided to a safe landing place by signals from the men on the ground, and they needed to remain overnight as all four men were required to manoeuvre the bogged aircraft to firm ground. This was done the next day, and both aircraft returned safely to base. As flights were completed, the main base was moved to Roy Hill then Fitzroy Crossing, enabling a larger area of Western Australia to be surveyed. The survey took seven weeks, and finished when the members returned to Sydney in mid-July 1933. An S-shaped series of salt lakes found on this survey were named Percival Lakes (21°22′S 124°41′E), after the aircraft designer.

=== Aerial survey 1935 ===
The third in the series of Mackay aerial survey flights departed Sydney 17 June 1935. Two aircraft were employed, the main one being a Monospar piloted by Frank Neale, and the backup being a Puss Moth owned and piloted by B.G.M. Shepherd, with Captain Wilkinson as radio operator. The survey area was to the north of the transcontinental railway line across the Nullarbor Plain. The first base used was Cook, followed in turn by Forrest, Rawlinna and Laverton in Western Australia. Finally, a return to Oodnadatta was needed to cover a previously missed area. The party returned to Sydney 22 July 1935 after a successful expedition during which many new lakes and mountains were mapped. Lake Jubilee north-east of Rawlinna being one such lake, named for the jubilee of King George V.

=== Aerial survey 1937 ===
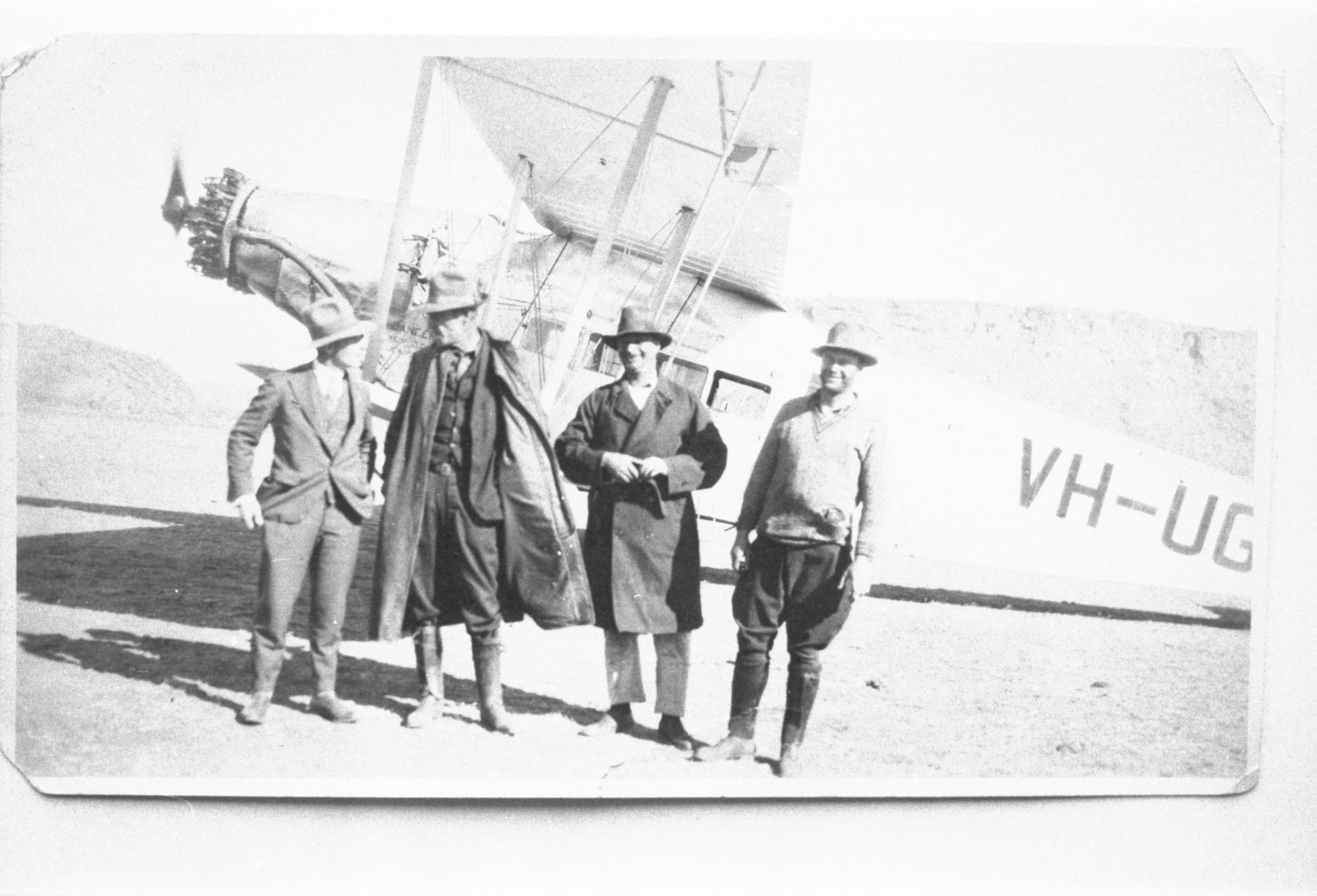
Mackay Expedition. Pilot Frank Neale, Navigator, Commander, Captain Bennett.

The fourth and last aerial survey by Donald Mackay used a de Havilland Dragonfly as the primary aircraft and a Puss Moth owned and flown by J.Pollock. Frank Neale was chief pilot, Commander H.T.Bennett was navigator and E.B.Ferguson radio operator. They departed Mascot aerodrome (Sydney) on 19 July 1937 and made their way via various stops en route to Hermannsburg to fill in some gaps in the earlier work of 1933 and 1935. A chain of lakes north of Mount Conner in the Northern Territory was seen, and they proved to be an extension of the string of lakes which included Lake Hopkins, Lake Neale and Lake Amadeus. Once completed they flew to Tanami north-west of Alice Springs to start the main work of surveying a large portion of the north-west of Western Australia. Several bases were used in the following weeks including Roy Hill, Fitzroy Crossing, Wave Hill, and Tennant Creek. Most of the flights resulted in finding previously unmapped salt lakes and some low ranges of hills. These surveys produced far more useful maps than had previously existed, and they were donated to the Commonwealth government and to the Mitchell Library in Sydney by Mackay.

== Later career ==
Mackay was appointed an Officer of the Order of the British Empire (OBE) in 1934 and raised to Commander level (CBE) in 1937. He received recognition from the Australian public as a pioneering Australian explorer, whose travels significantly increased man's knowledge of remote areas.

Mackay died on 17 September 1958 in Sutherland Shire Hospital near Sydney. A widower, he had no children.
