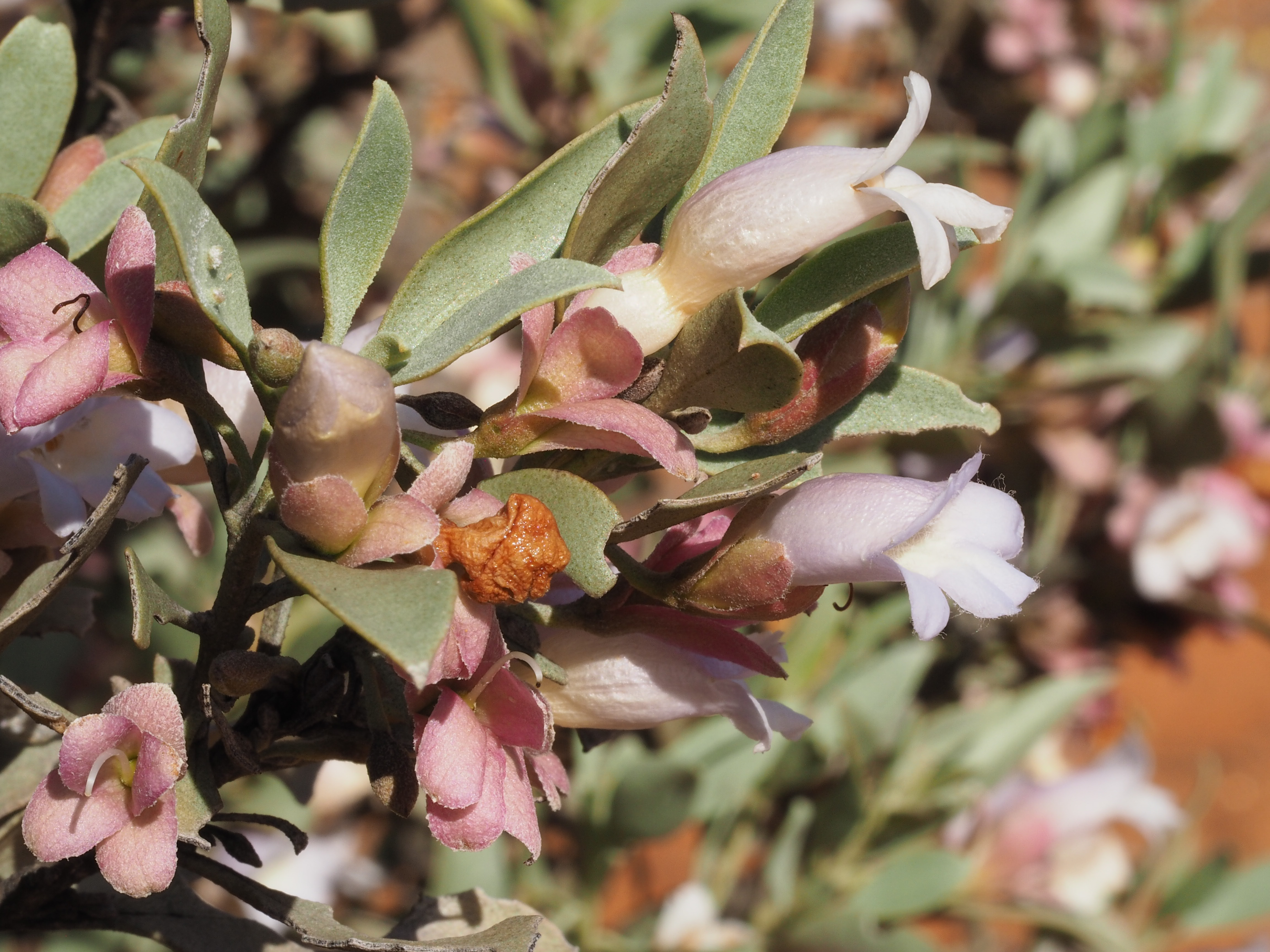
- Eremophila tietkensii leaves and flowers

Scientific classification
- Kingdom: Plantae
- Clade: Embryophytes
- Clade: Tracheophytes
- Clade: Angiosperms
- Clade: Eudicots
- Clade: Asterids
- Order: Lamiales
- Family: Scrophulariaceae
- Genus: Eremophila
- Species: E. tietkensii

Binomial name
- Eremophila tietkensii F.Muell. & Tate

Synonyms
- Eremophila latrobei var. tietkensii (F.Muell. & Tate) Ewart & P.H.Jarrett

= Eremophila tietkensii =

Species of flowering plant

Eremophila tietkensii is a flowering plant in the figwort family, Scrophulariaceae and is endemic to Australia. It is a rounded to flat-topped shrub with grey-green leaves, usually pinkish-purple sepals and mauve, pink or lilac-coloured petals. It is mostly found in Western Australia but also occurs in the far west of the Northern Territory.

== Description ==
Eremophila tietkensii is a rounded or flat-topped shrub which grows to a height of between 0.6 and 2.5 m (2 and 8 ft) with its branches and leaves covered with a layer of fine grey hairs pressed against the surface. The leaves are arranged alternately, well spaced along the branches, grey-green and have a flattened stalk that is 6–12 mm (0.2–0.5 in) long. The leaf blade is lance-shaped to egg-shaped, mostly 30–72 mm (1–3 in) long, 6–17 mm (0.2–0.7 in) wide and has a smooth surface.

The flowers are borne in groups of up to 4 in leaf axils on a hairy stalk which is usually 6.5–14 mm (0.3–0.6 in) long. There are 5 overlapping, elliptic to lance-shaped, green or pinkish-purple sepals which are mostly 7.5–15 mm (0.3–0.6 in) long. Both surfaces of the sepals are hairy, especially around the edges and are usually more hairy on the outer surface. The petals are 22–28 mm (0.9–1 in) long and are joined at their lower end to form a tube. The petal tube is pale lilac to pale mauve or pink on the outside and white with purple spots inside the tube. The outer surface of the petal tube is slightly hairy but the inner surface of the lobes is glabrous while the inside of the tube is filled with long, woolly hairs. The 4 stamens are fully enclosed in the petal tube. Flowering occurs between April and October and the fruit which follow are dry, woody, oval to conical in shape with a distinct point and 6–7 mm (0.2–0.3 in) long.

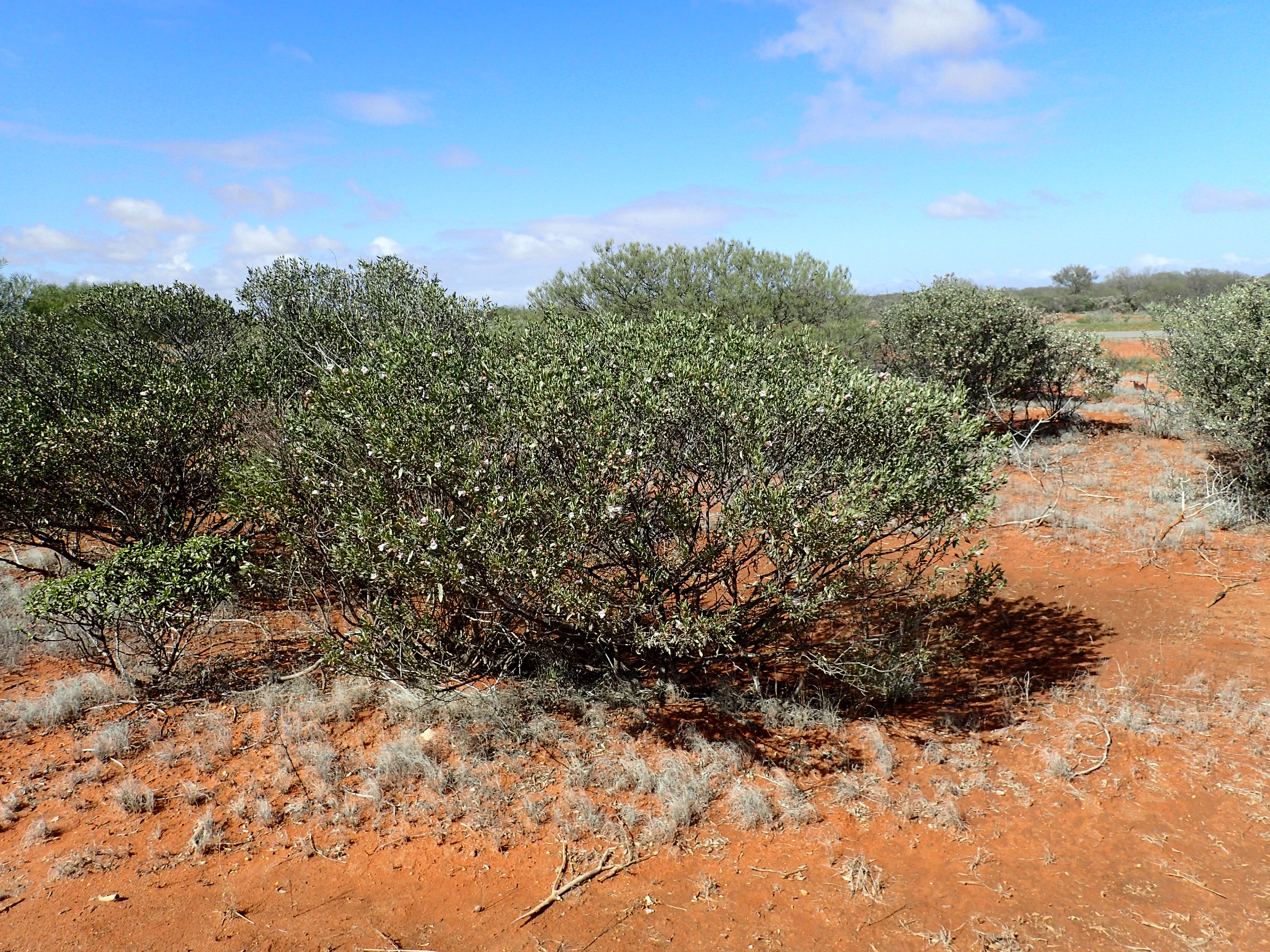
E. tietkensii growing west of Gascoyne Junction

== Taxonomy and naming ==
Eremophila tietkensii was first formally described by Ferdinand von Mueller and Ralph Tate in 1890 from specimens collected on the 1889 expedition of William Tietkens in the Northern Territory. The description was published in Transactions and proceedings and report, Royal Society of South Australia. In 1928, Alfred James Ewart and Phyllis Heather Jarrett considered it to be a variety of Eremophila latrobei, publishing their report in Proceedings of the Royal Society of Victoria but after examining the original specimens and comparing them with those of E. latrobei, Robert Chinnock reverted to the original name. Chinnock's 2007 explanation was published in Journal of the Adelaide Botanic Garden. The specific epithet (tietkensii) honours the explorer Tietkens.

== Distribution and habitat ==
This eremophila is widespread in Western Australia, occurring in inland areas between the Rawlinson and Barlee ranges, growing on rocky slopes, stony clay flats and undulating plains in the Carnarvon, Central Ranges, Gascoyne, Gibson Desert, Great Sandy Desert, Little Sandy Desert, Murchison and Pilbara biogeographic regions. It also occurs in the far south-west of the Northern Territory.

== Use in horticulture ==
In an ideal situation, E. tietkensii is a compact round shrub with grey-green, leathery leaves, masses of pinkish flowers in early spring and coloured sepals which remain after the petals have fallen. It is difficult to propagate from seeds or cuttings but grafts readily onto Myoporum rootstock. It grows best in well-drained soil in a sunny position and is drought tolerant, needing only the occasional watering during a long dry spell, however it is frost sensitive.

== Conservation ==
This species is classified as "not threatened" by the Western Australian Government Department of Parks and Wildlife.
