= Blériot-Whippet =

Overview
- Manufacturer: Air Navigation and Engineering Company
- Production: 1920-1927
- Designer: Herbert Jones and W.D. Marchant

Body and chassis
- Class: cyclecar
- Body style: 2-seat open

Powertrain
- Engine: Blackburne, 997 cc
- Transmission: infinitely variable belt 3-speed manual

Dimensions
- Wheelbase: 81 or 87 inches (2057 or 2210 mm)
- Length: 116 inches (2945 mm)

Chronology
- Successor: none

The Blériot-Whippet was a British 4 wheeled cyclecar made from 1920 to 1927 by the Air Navigation and Engineering Company based in Addlestone, Surrey.

The Blériot aircraft company had opened a factory at Addlestone during World War I to make SPAD and Avro aircraft and in 1920 the ownership of the plant changed to the Air Navigation and Engineering Co. and introduced car making with a cyclecar designed by Herbert Jones and W.D. Marchant. There seems to have been no connection with the cyclecar made by the French Blériot company.

The most unusual feature of the car was its infinitely variable belt transmission using expanding pulleys to a design called the Zenith-Gradua. It had originally been used on Zenith motor cycles. Power came from a 1 Litre, Blackburne air-cooled, V-twin, engine producing 14 bhp (10 kW) at 2000 rpm and mounted with cylinders one behind the other. This was modified by Jones and Marchant to have roller bearing big ends. The chassis had quarter elliptic leaf springs all round.

In 1922 the belt drive was replaced by a conventional three-speed gearbox and chain drive. The chain drive car was in 1923 joined by a shaft drive model with the engine turned through 90 degrees.

Two seat open bodies were standard made of plywood covered in leather cloth and came in tourer and sports versions. Later a 3/4 seat version was added to the range. The car cost GBP 300 at launch falling to GBP115 in 1924.

Several hundred are thought to have been made and one was owned by Alec Issigonis. Only one is known to survive.

The Air Navigation and Engineering Company also made the Eric Longden light car at Addlestone as well as some aircraft and gliders, but failed in 1927. The factory later housed the British manufacture of fabric bodied Weymann coachwork and later Metro Cammell Weymann bus bodies, this business continuing until 1965.

== See also ==
- List of car manufacturers of the United Kingdom
