= Outstation =

An outstation is a subsidiary establishment of some kind at a distance from the main establishment. It may also refer to:

- Outstation (Aboriginal community), Australia
- Outstation (aviation), an airport that is not a hub, focus city, nor base of an air carrier
- Outstation (Australian agriculture), a subsidiary homestead on a large cattle or sheep station, Australia
- Outstation (bus), bus storage depot, UK
- Outstation (church), a newly formed congregation managed by the nearest parish priest, mostly in Africa

== See also ==
- RAF Eastcote, also known as Eastcote Outstation
