= Petermann Aboriginal Land Trust =

Aboriginal land trust in the Northern Territory, Australia

The Petermann Aboriginal Land Trust is a land trust for a large block of land in the southwest corner of the Northern Territory, Australia. It was created by law in July 1978. The block of land (called Northern Territory Portion 1634) covers an area of 44,970 square kilometres (17,360 sq mi). It makes up most of the area of the old Petermann Reserve (1920–1977). The land's traditional owners are mostly Pitjantjatjara, Yankunytjatjara and Luritja people. This includes residents of Kaltukatjara and over 50 family outstations.

The block held by the Petermann ALT is surrounded by other Aboriginal land blocks on all sides. It borders the Ngaanyatjarra Lands to the west (in Western Australia), the Aṉangu Pitjantjatjara Yankunytjatjara Lands to the south (in South Australia), Haasts Bluff Aboriginal Land Trust to the north, and Katiti and Urrampinyi Iltjiltajarri Aboriginal Land Trusts to the east.

== History ==
In March 1920, an area of land in the southwest corner of the Northern Territory was made into an aboriginal reservation, called the Petermann Reserve. It was meant to be a temporary refuge (safe place) for the Aboriginal families living in the area, many of whom were still living traditional, nomadic lifestyles. It bordered other large reserves created in Western Australia and South Australia, and together the area was known as the Central Australian Aboriginal Reserve. In 1940, the Petermann Reserve was made smaller, to allow people to look for gold. It was made smaller again in 1958, when the government excised the area around Uluṟu and Kata Tjuṯa to create the Ayers Rock–Mt Olga National Park.

In 1976, the Commonwealth Parliament passed the Aboriginal Land Rights Act, which allowed for Aboriginal communities to be granted freehold title to land if they could show that they lived on the land for many years. Section 4 of the act gave the Minister for Aboriginal Affairs the power to establish Aboriginal Land Trusts to look after the title. The trusts would be established by publishing notices in the government gazette. In 1977, the old Petermann Reserve land was transferred to the Petermann Land Trust and to other Aboriginal land-owning corporations. The boundaries of the Petermann trust were first described in the Gazette on 21 July 1978. They were later made into law by Act No. 109 of 1985, which went into effect on 16 October 1985.
