= ANEC I =

Type of aircraft

ANEC I / II
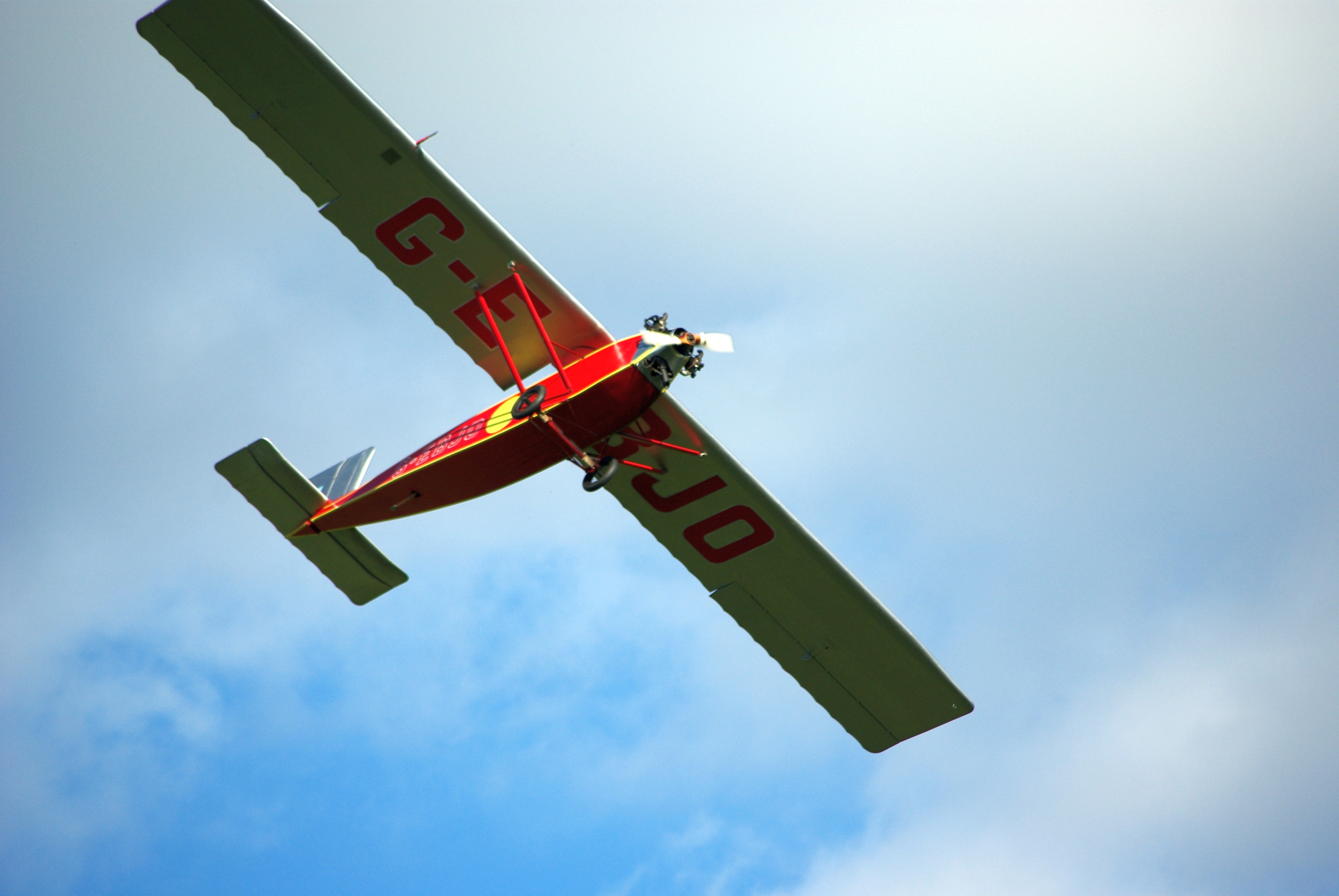
- ANEC II, G-EBJO, at the Shuttleworth Collection

General information
- Type: ultralight aircraft
- Manufacturer: Air Navigation and Engineering Company Limited
- Designer: W.S. Shackleton
- Number built: 3 (ANEC I), 1 (ANEC II)

History
- First flight: 1923

The ANEC I and ANEC II were 1920s British single-engine ultralight aircraft designed and built by Air Navigation and Engineering Company Limited at Addlestone Surrey. One was privately constructed in Brisbane, Australia.

One example was flown in France under the designation Blériot 102.

== History ==
The ANEC I and II, designed by W.S Shackleton, were amongst the earliest ultralight aircraft; they were very small, wooden, strut braced high-wing monoplanes. The first ANEC I, registered G-EBHR, first flew at Brooklands on 21 August 1923. It was the first aircraft with an inverted engine, a 696 cc Blackburne Tomtit, to fly in the United Kingdom. The ANEC I was designed to the rules of the 1923 Lympne light aircraft trials, principally an engine capacity limit of 750 cc, and the two aircraft completed that August took part. The main prizes were for fuel economy and the second ANEC I G-EBIL, flown by Jimmy James, shared half of the £1,500 prize with an English Electric Wren for flights of 87.5 miles (141 km) on one gallon (4.54 L) of petrol. He later reached an altitude of 14,000 ft (4,267 m) in it. G-EBIL was evaluated by the Air Ministry in 1924, briefly carrying the RAF serial J7506. Afterwards it was modified with a wingspan greatly reduced from 32 ft to 18 ft 4 in (9.75 m to 5.59 m) and re-engined with a 1,000 cc Anzani engine for entry in the 1925 Lympne August Bank Holiday Races, designated the ANEC IA.

Only one more ANEC I was constructed. It was built in Australia by George Beohm, who went on to design the Genairco Biplane, and Horrie Miller. E. W. Beckman, the owner of the aircraft, intended to enter it in the Low-Powered Aeroplane Competition held at Richmond in December 1924, but it was not completed until the following year. The first of the two built in the United Kingdom in 1923, G-EBHR, was exported to Australia in the second half of 1924.

The Blériot firm imported a single example to France to compete in the French: Tour de France Des Avionettes competition in 1924. After placing second, it was returned to ANEC.

The ANEC II was an enlarged version of the ANEC I built for the 1924 Lympne light aircraft trials competition. Following the revised competition rules, it was a two-seater and its more powerful 1,100 cc Anzani inverted V twin-cylinder had the greatest capacity allowed. The wing area was increased by 28% to accommodate the extra weight by a 5 ft 2 in (1.57 m) span extension. It was also longer by almost the same amount. Engine problems kept it from flying in the competition and out of the Grosvenor Trophy race that immediately followed.

In 1927 a new owner refitted it with a 32 hp (24 kW) Bristol Cherub III flat twin engine, a larger rudder, and a more conventional undercarriage with larger wheels mounted on a cross axle attached to the lower fuselage with a pair of V-struts. In 1931 another new owner fitted a heavier 30 hp (22 kW) ABC Scorpion engine, another flat twin and, to keep the weight down, reworked it as a single seater. It was in this condition when it was acquired by Richard Shuttleworth in about 1937.

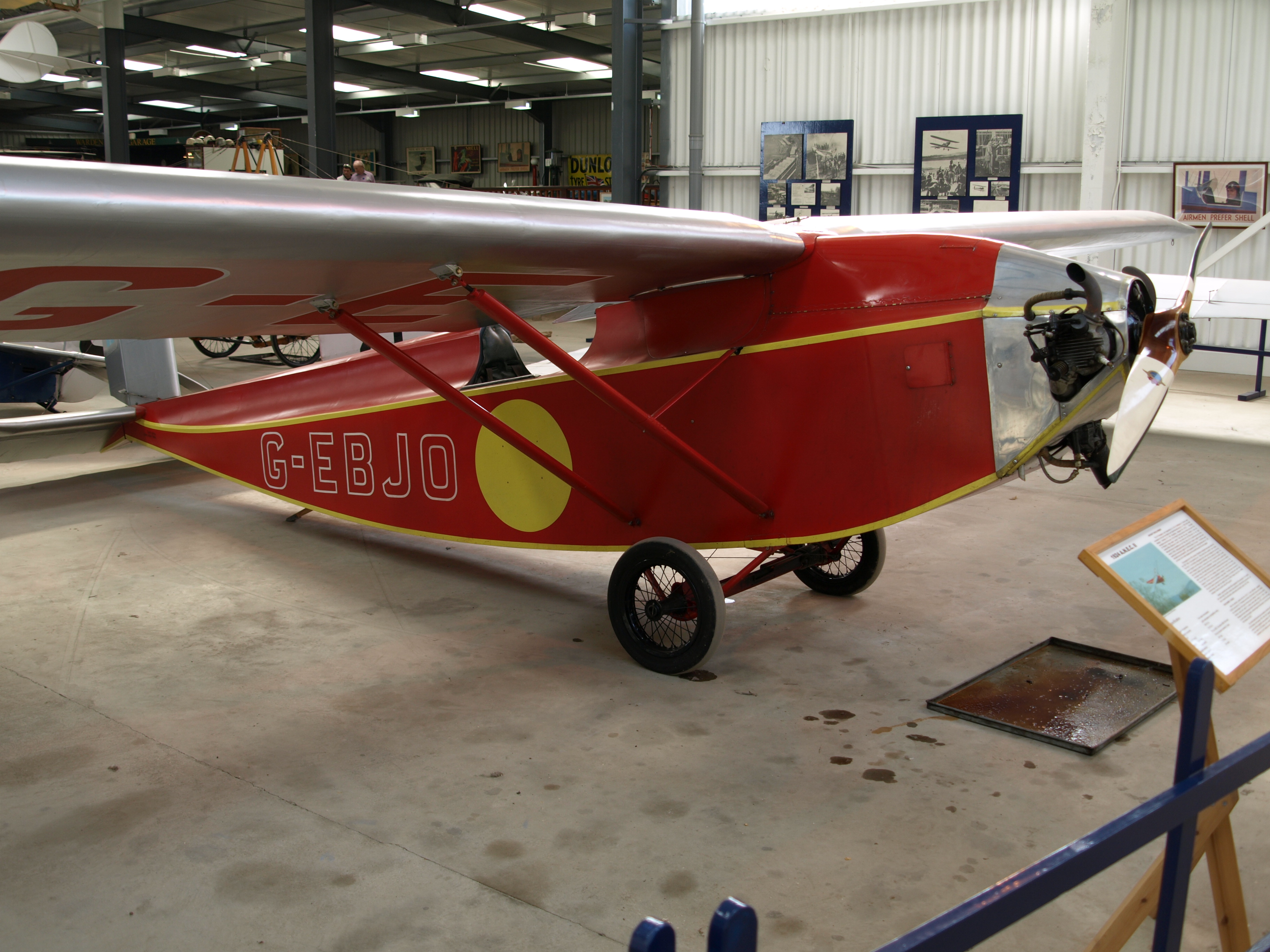
Shuttleworth's ANEC II

== Variants ==
- ANEC I – three built
- ANEC IA – ANEC I with reduced wingspan, one modified.
- ANEC II – two-seat version, one built

== Survivors ==
The 1924 ANEC II G-EBJO is owned and operated by The Shuttleworth Collection in the UK and is maintained to an airworthy condition. It underwent restoration to post-Lympne configuration, being completed in 2004, with a single seat, revised undercarriage and fitted with an ABC Scorpion II 30 HP engine. It can be seen flown at Shuttleworth airshows in the summer months, as well as on static display as part of the Collection all year round.

== Operators ==
- Australia: 2 ANEC I aircraft
- United Kingdom: 1 ANEC I, 1 ANEC II

== Specifications (ANEC I) ==
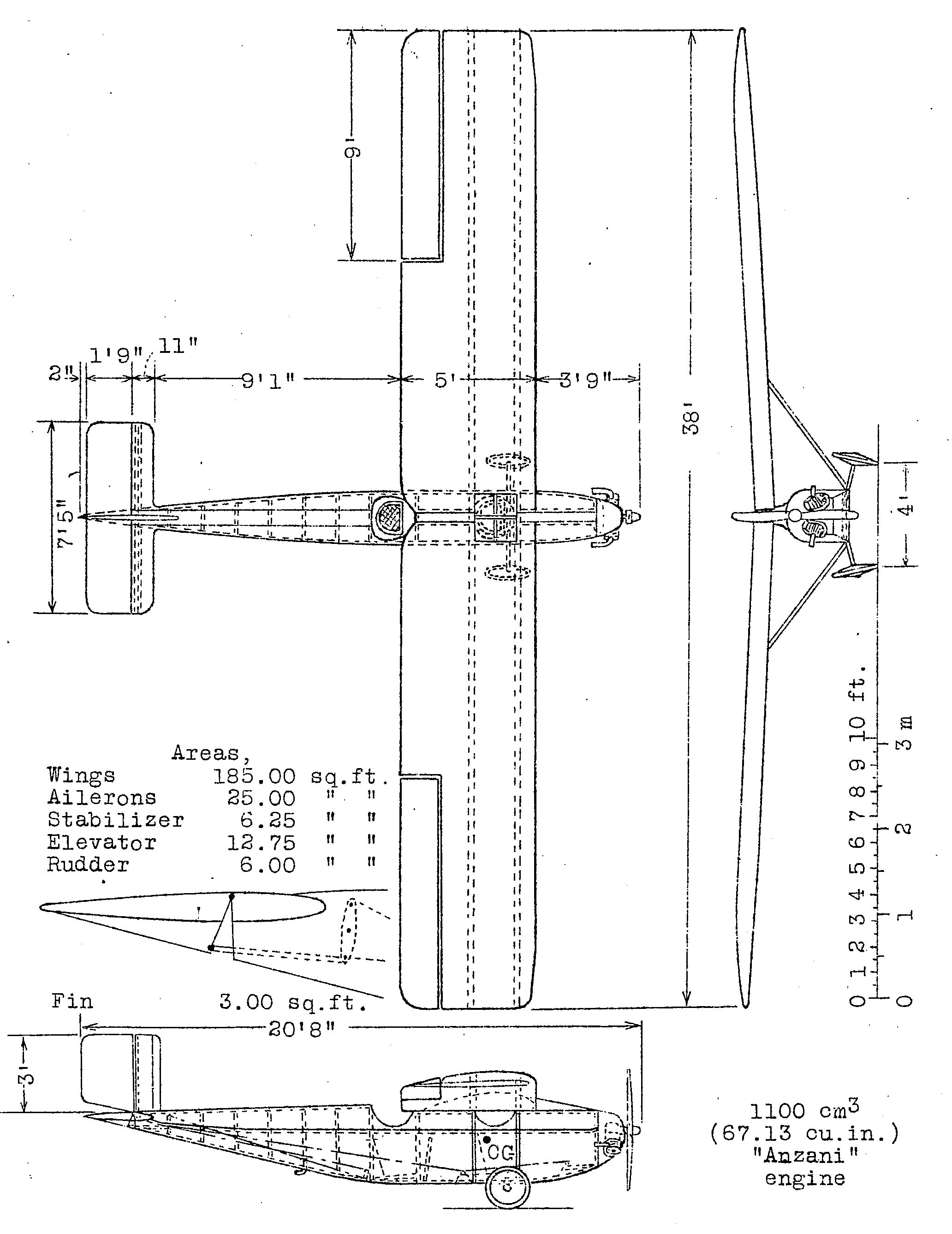
ANEC II 3-view drawing from NACA-TM-289

Data from Jane's all the World's Aircraft 1924, British Civil Aviation since 1919 Volume 1

General characteristics

- Crew: 1
- Length: 15 ft 7 in (4.75 m)
- Wingspan: 32 ft 10 in (10.01 m)
- Height: 3 ft (0.91 m)
- Wing area: 145 sq ft (13.5 m^{2})
- Empty weight: 290 lb (132 kg)
- Gross weight: 470 lb (213 kg)
- Powerplant: 1 × Blackburne Tomtit 2-cylinder air-cooled inverted V piston engine, 16 hp (12 kW)
- Propellers: 2-bladed fixed pitch propeller

Performance

- Maximum speed: 74 mph (119 km/h, 64 kn)
- Stall speed: 32 mph (51 km/h, 28 kn)
- Time to altitude: 3,000 ft (910 m) in 8minutes
- Wing loading: 3.21 lb/sq ft (15.7 kg/m^{2})
- Power/mass: 23.2 hp/lb (38.1 kW/kg)
- Fuel consumption: 60 mpg_{‑imp} (21 km/L)

== See also ==
Aircraft of comparable role, configuration, and era

- English Electric Wren
