= ANEC IV =

Type of aircraft

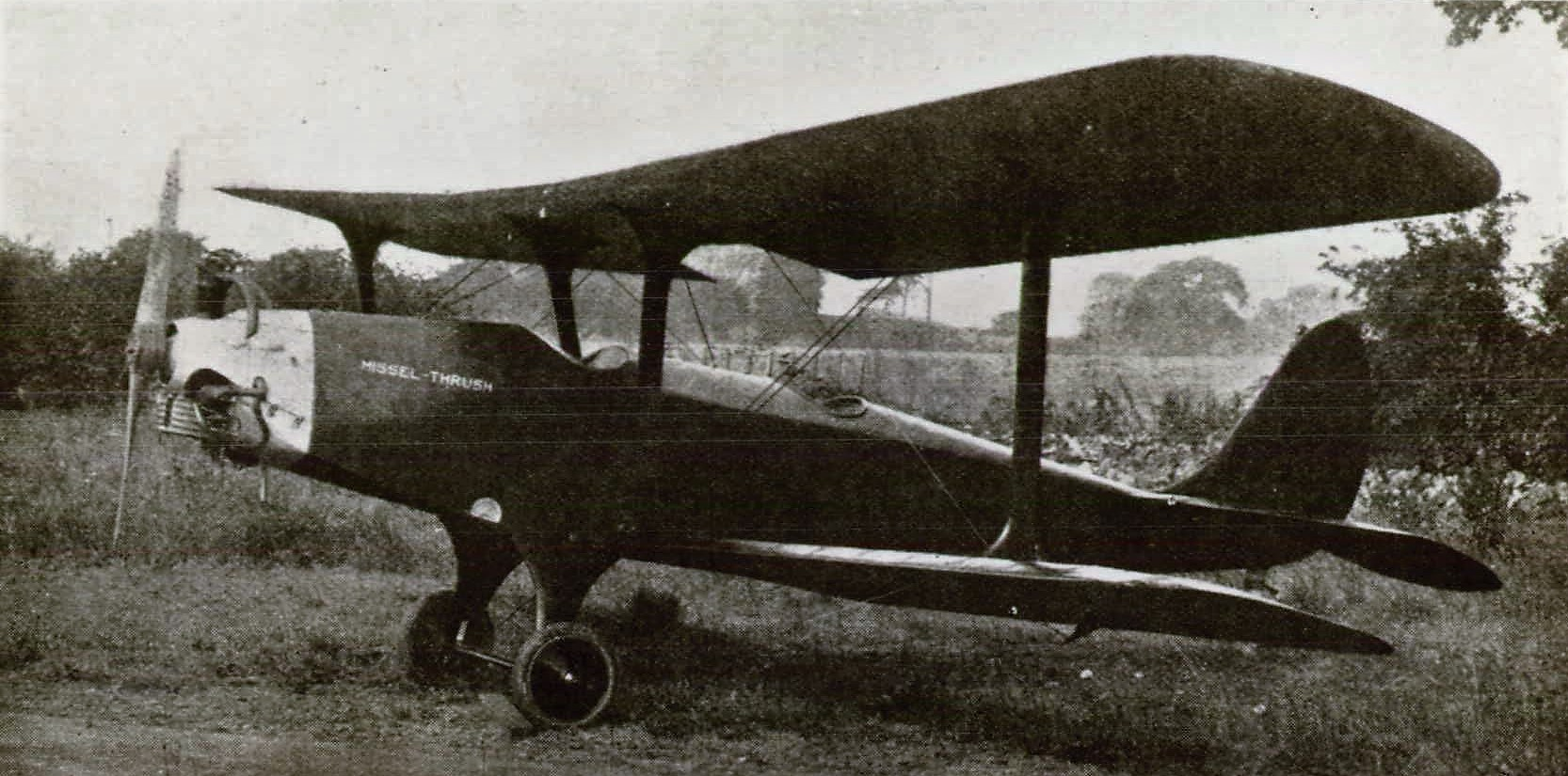

General information
- Type: light aircraft
- Manufacturer: Air Navigation and Engineering Company Limited
- Designer: John Bewsher
- Number built: 1

History
- First flight: 1926
- Retired: 1928

The ANEC IV Missel Thrush was a 1920s British two-seat light aircraft built by Air Navigation and Engineering Company Limited at Addlestone Surrey.

== History ==
The ANEC IV biplane was designed by John Bewsher for the 1926 Lympne light aircraft trial for two seaters fitted with engines of less than 170 lb. It did not make the competition as the undercarriage collapsed in a taxiing accident. In 1927 the only aircraft built (registered G-EBPI) was sold to a private owner who replaced the original Blackburne Thrush radial engine with an Armstrong Siddeley Genet II engine. The owner was killed and the aircraft destroyed while competing in the 1928 King's Cup Race.

== Operators ==
- United Kingdom: Private owners

== Specifications (ANEC IV) ==
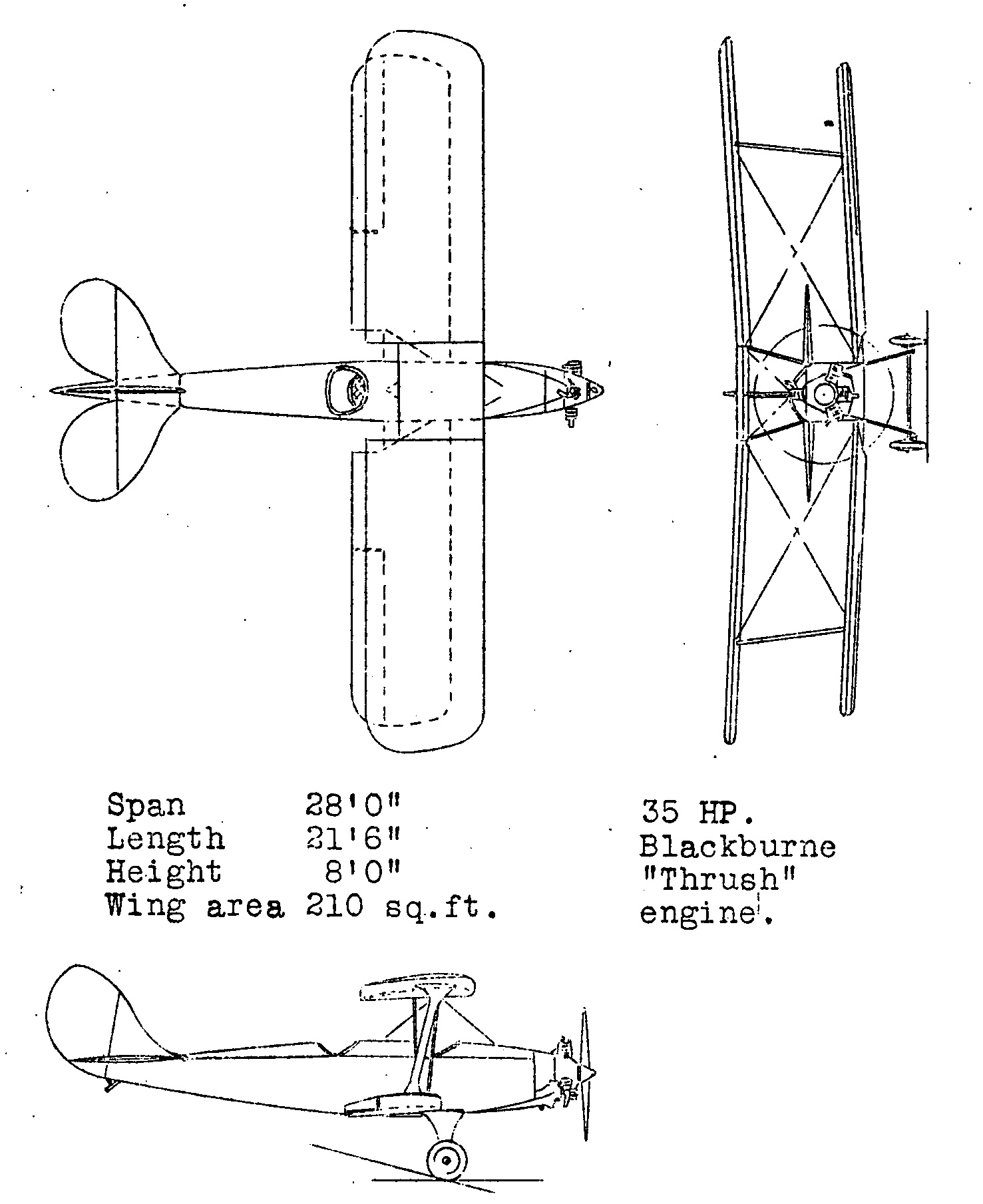
ANEC IV 3-view drawing from NACA Aircraft Circular No.21

Data from British Civil Aviation since 1919 Volume I

General characteristics

- Crew: 2
- Length: 21 ft 6 in (6.55 m)
- Wingspan: 28 ft 0 in (8.53 m)
- Height: 8 ft 0 in (2.44 m)
- Wing area: 210 sq ft (20 m^{2})
- Gross weight: 1,150 lb (522 kg)
- Powerplant: 1 × Blackburne Thrush 3-cylinder air-cooled radial piston engine, 35 hp (26 kW)
- Propellers: 2-bladed fixed-pitch propeller

Performance

- Maximum speed: 80 mph (130 km/h, 70 kn)
