= Mount Leisler =

Mountain in Australia

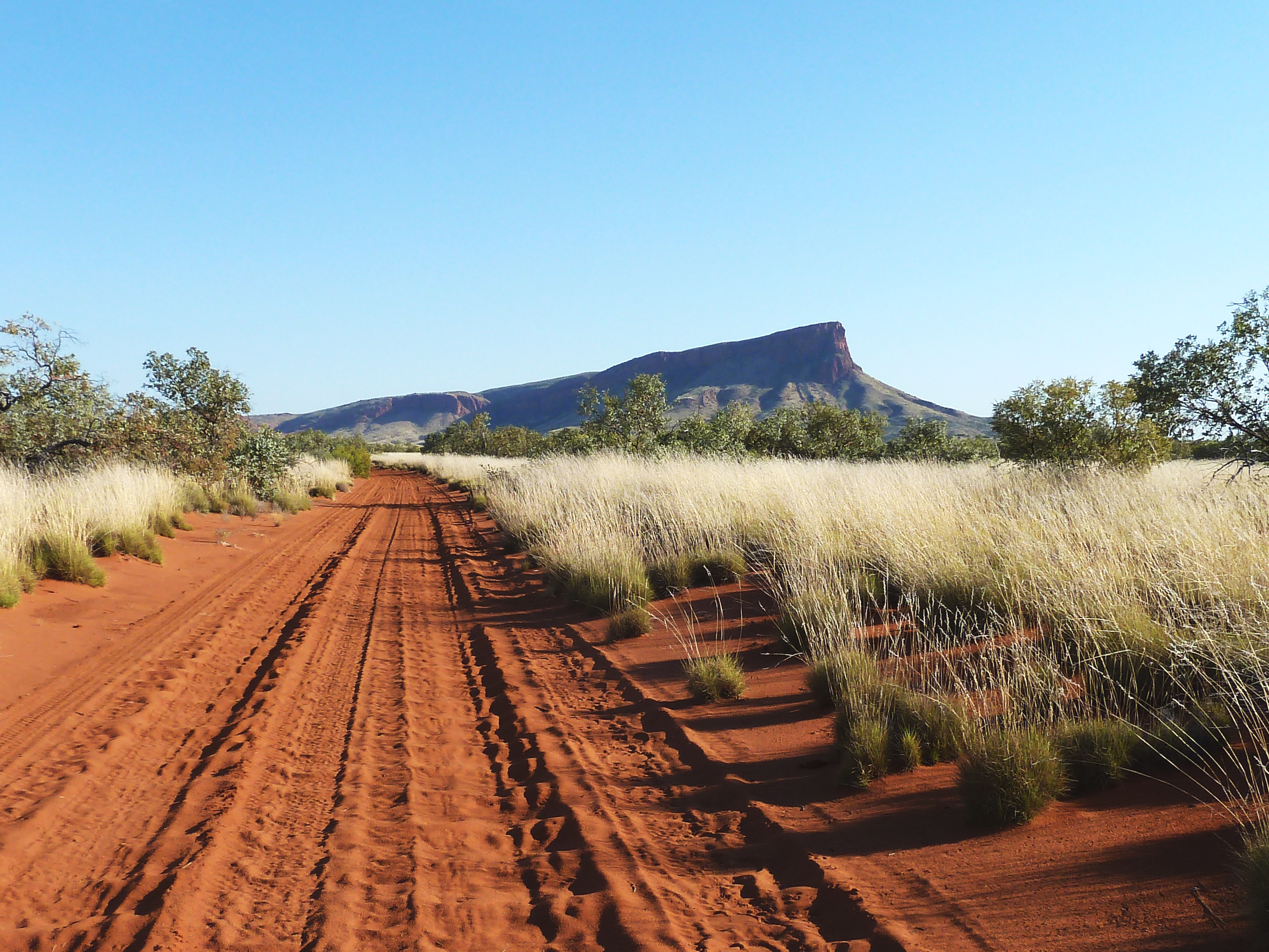
- Looking north from Sandy Blight Junction Road

Highest point
- Elevation: 897 m (2,943 ft)AHD
- Coordinates: 23°19′58″S 129°21′57″E

Naming
- Etymology: Mr Louis Leisler

Geography
- Location within Northern Territory
- Location: Northern Territory, Australia
- Parent range: Kintore Range

Mount Leisler is the highest point in the Kintore Range in the south-west of the Northern Territory of Australia. Its elevation is 897 metres (2,943 ft) AHD.

== Location and features ==
Mount Leisler was named by William Tietkens on 27 May 1889. Tietkens was in command of the "Central Australian Exploring Expedition" 1889 under the auspices of the Royal Geographical Society of Australasia, South Australian Branch. He named Kintore Range in honour of Lord Kintore, governor of South Australia, and Mount Leisler in honour of Mr Louis Leisler of Glasgow who had provided funds for Tietkens to open up land between Fowlers Bay, South Australia and the Musgrave Ranges.

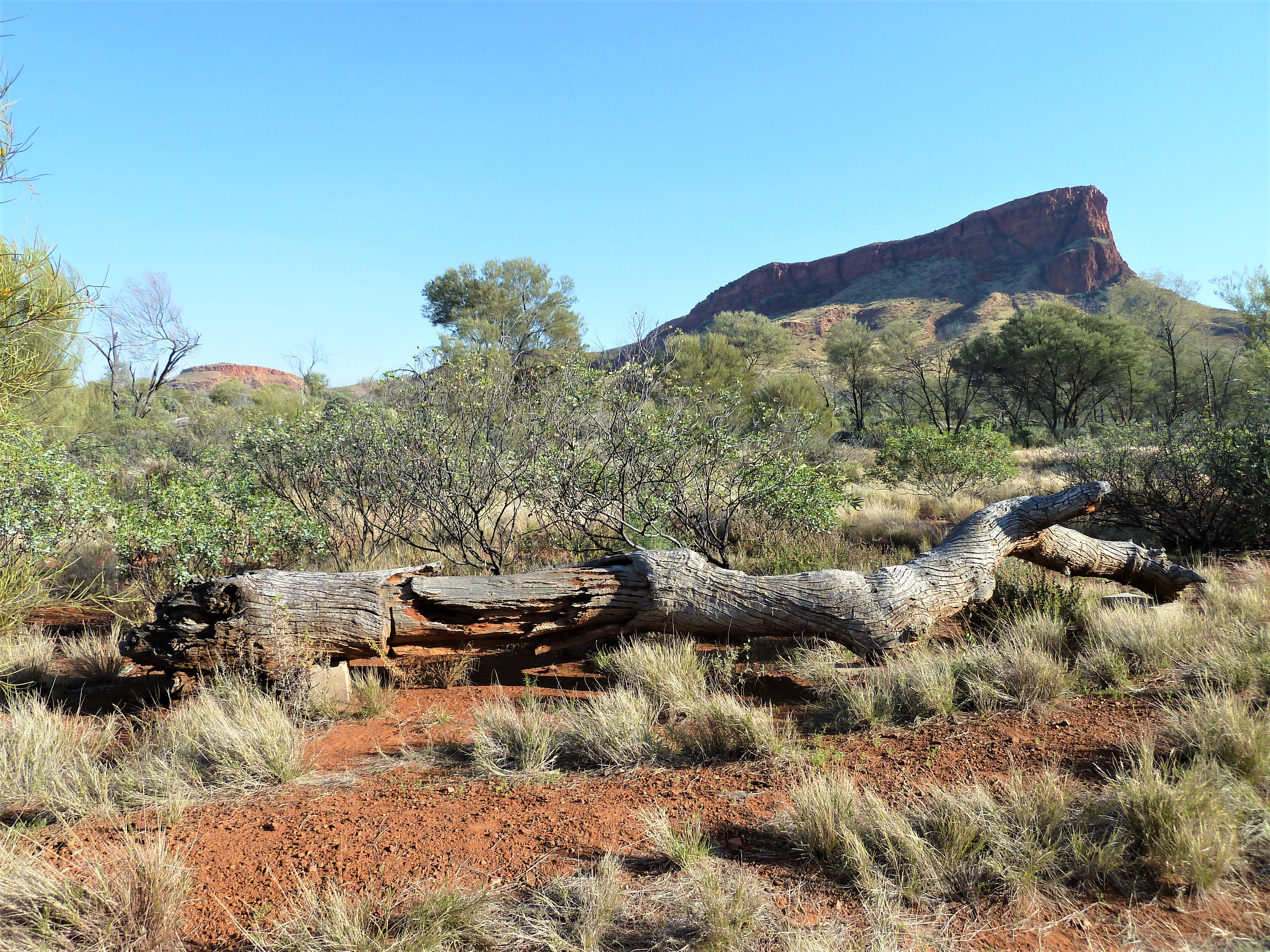
Tietkens Tree in front of Mount Leisler in 2011

Tietkens measured the height of the mountain at 446 metres (1,462 ft) above the surrounding plain.

Tietkens blazed a tree at the base of the mountain with the letter T, below which were the numbers 5.89. This tree was re-discovered by Len Beadell in 1960 while building the Sandy Blight Junction Road, and some branches were still bearing foliage. The tree has since died and fallen over.

== See also ==
- List of mountains of the Northern Territory
- Sandy Blight Junction Road
- Tietkens expedition of 1889
