= Eric Longden =

Eric Longden was a British cyclecar brand manufactured from 1920 to 1927, originally by the Australian racing driver Eric Longden, and from 1922 by the Air Navigation and Engineering Company from Addlestone (Surrey). ANEC also built the Blériot-Whippet.

In 1922 there were four models: The 8 hp and 10 hp both had V2 engines. The 8 hp was side-valved and had a 1.0 litre displacement, while the 10 hp had overhead valves and a 1.1 litre displacement. There were also two side-valve four-cylinder models, the 9 hp, with a 1.1 litre displacement and the 11 hp with 1.3 litre displacement. Both four-cylinder versions had a wheelbase of 2489 mm.

During 1923, the 11 hp changed to a slightly smaller engine of 1.25 litres and an extended 2540 mm wheelbase. From 1924 onwards, this was the only model offered.

== Models ==
Model	Period	Cylinders	Capacity	Wheelbase
8 hp	1922	2 V	974 cm^{3}	
9 hp	1922–1923	4 Inline	1074 cm^{3}	2489 mm
10 hp	1922	2 V	1081 cm^{3}	
11 hp	1922–1923	4 Inline	1320 cm^{3}	2489 mm
11 hp	1923–1927	4 Inline	1261 cm^{3}	2540 mm

== Literature ==
- David Culshaw, Peter Horrobin: The Complete Catalogue of British Cars 1895–1975. Veloce Publishing PLC, Dorchester 1997, ISBN 1-874105-93-6.
