= Lake Hopkins =

Salt lake in Western Australia

- Location within Western Australia
- Interactive map of Lake Hopkins
- Location: Northern Territory
- Coordinates: 24°15′S 128°50′E
- Type: Salt lake
- Basin countries: Australia
- Max. length: 42 km (26 mi)
- Max. width: 35 km (22 mi)
- Surface elevation: 441 m (1,447 ft)

Lake Hopkins is a salt lake in the east of Western Australia very close to the Northern Territory border. It is located to the west of Lake Neale, which together with Lake Amadeus forms part of a chain of salt lakes that stretches about 500 km (310 mi), from Lake Hopkins in the west to the Finke River in the east. This drainage basin is known as the Amadeus Basin. The lake is usually a dry salt pan, and only holds water for short periods after heavy rainfall. Lake Hopkins has an elevation of 441 metres (1447 feet) above mean sea level. The lake proved to be quite an obstacle to progress for Len Beadell during construction of the Sandy Blight Junction Road in 1960.

== See also ==
- Lake Amadeus
- Lake Neale
- Sandy Blight Junction Road
