= Neale Junction =

Remote road junction in Western Australia

Neale Junction Western Australia
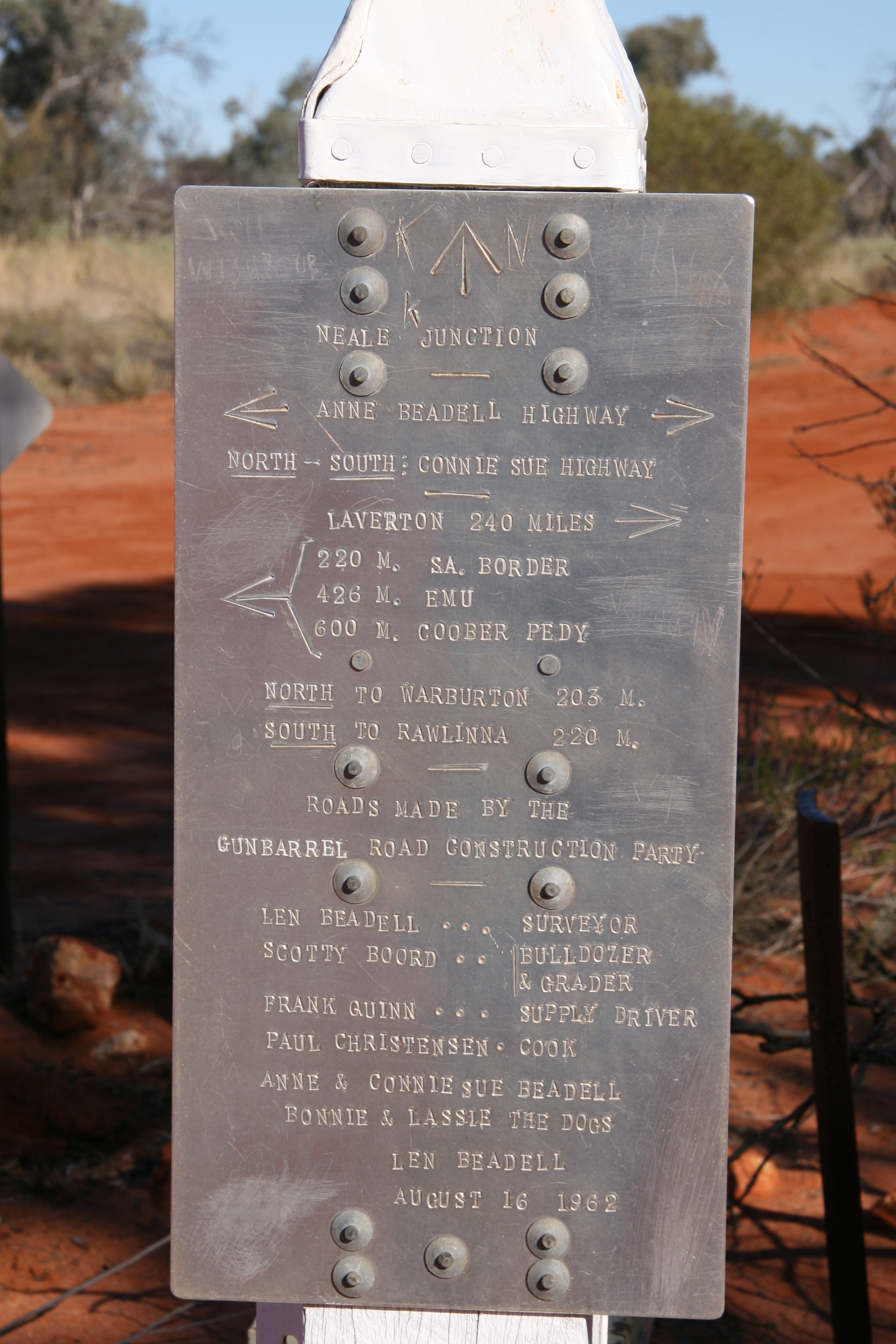
- Neale Junction – Len Beadell marker
- Coordinates: 28°18′9.95″S 125°49′1.77″E

General information
- Type: Road junction
- Junction type: Intersection
- Location: Great Victoria Desert, 172 km (107 mi) west of Ilkurlka
- Opened: 16 August 1962
- Built by: Gunbarrel Road Construction Party
- Roads at junction: Anne Beadell Highway; Connie Sue Highway

Neale Junction is an isolated location in the Great Victoria Desert of Western Australia, where the Anne Beadell and Connie Sue Highways intersect. It is 172 km (107 mi) west of Ilkurlka. Neale Junction was named after Commander Frank Neale, who flew a Percival Gull through the area during the Mackay Aerial Reconnaissance Survey Expedition to Western and South Australia in 1935.

It has a Len Beadell marker and is indicated as suitable for camping on some maps.

Neale Junction is also a location of a large nature reserve that sits north west of the even larger Great Victoria Desert Nature Reserve.

The junction visitors book was deposited in the J S Battye Library in 2002.

== See also ==
- Highways in Australia
- List of highways in Western Australia
