= Tietkens expedition of 1889 =

Australian exploration in Northern Territory 1889

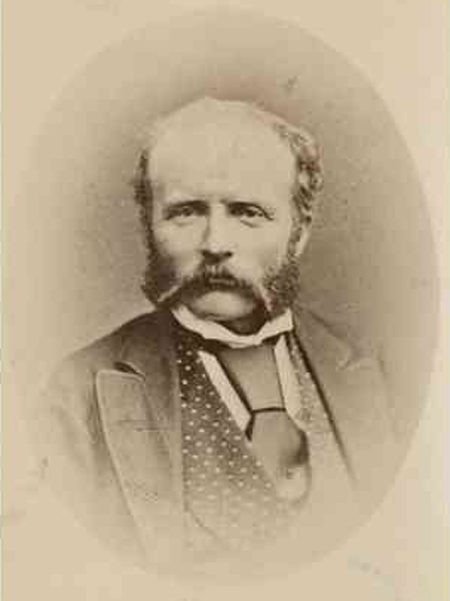
Photograph of William Tietkens held in the State Library of South Australia

The Tietkens expedition of 1889 was led by William Tietkens. It covered territory west of Alice Springs to the vicinity of the Western Australian border.

== Expedition members ==
The expedition members were:

- David Beetson
- Fred Warman
- Billy (a black-tracker from the ranks of the native police at Alice Springs)
- A small native boy

== Dates ==
The expedition took place from March to July 1889.

== Purpose and outcome ==
Tietkens hoped to discover a supply channel to Lake Amadeus from hills to the north-west, expecting that this might open a reliable route to the north-west coast settlements. He succeeded in proving that it did not exist.

== Support ==
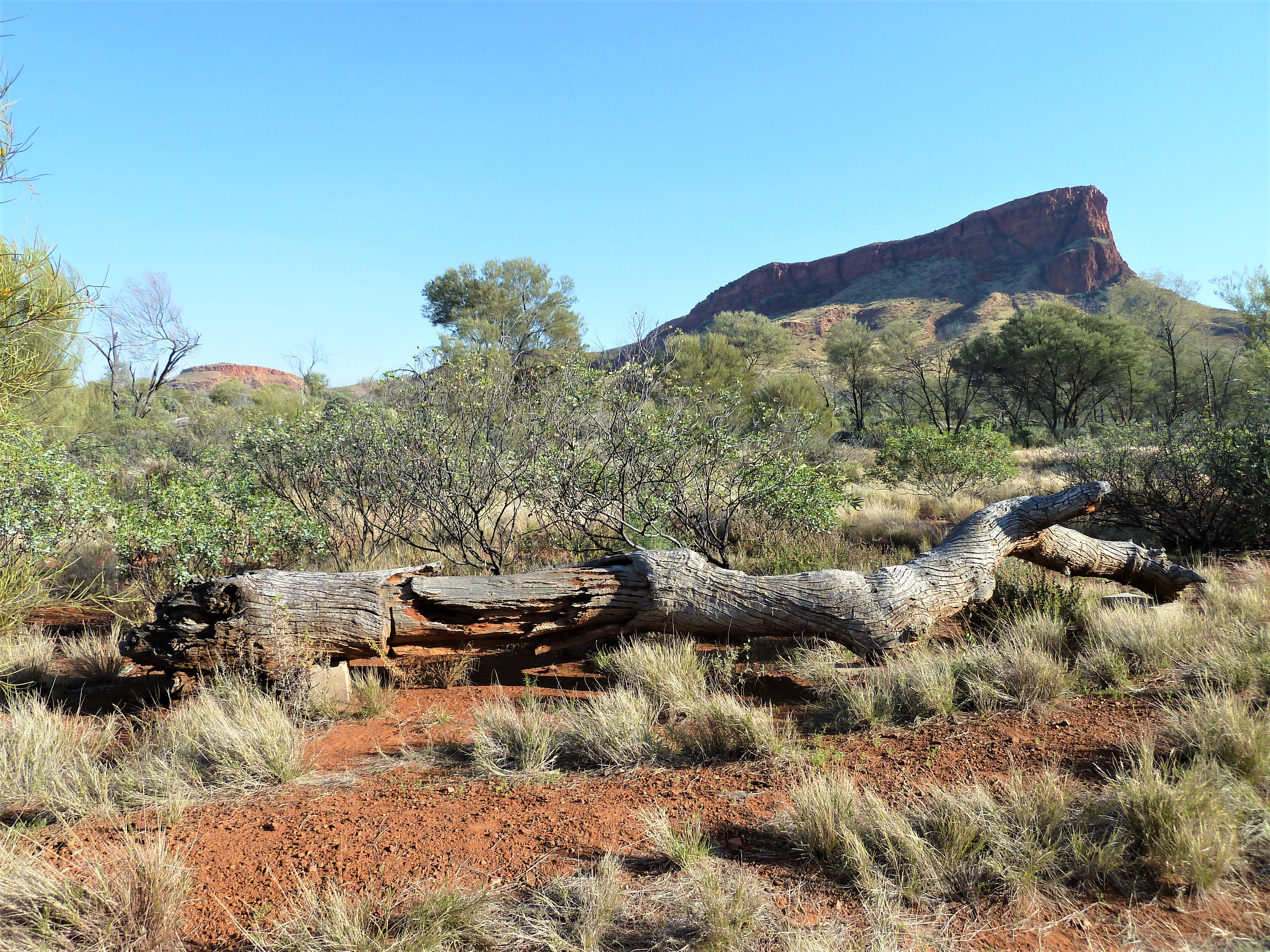
Tietkens tree with Mount Leisler in the background. This tree was blazed by William Tietkens during his 1889 expedition in Central Australia. It was re-discovered in 1960 by Len Beadell when it was still standing, and had foliage on some branches. At the time of this photograph, it had fallen over and was supported off the ground by concrete cradles.

The South Australian branch of the Royal Geographical Society of Australasia was instrumental in mounting the expedition and appointing Tietkens as leader.

== Discoveries ==
This expedition discovered Lake Macdonald (Karrkurutinyja), the Kintore Range, Mount Leisler, Mount Rennie, the Cleland Hills, defined the western borders of Lake Amadeus, and photographed Uluru (Ayers Rock) and Kata Tjuta (Mount Olga) for the first time.

Features named by Tietkens, with the source of the name, include:

- Lake Macdonald, named for Mr A. C. Macdonald, the secretary of the Victorian branch of the Royal Geographical Society.
- Kintore Range, named for Lord Kintore, governor of South Australia.
- Mount Leisler, named for Louis Leisler, a financial supporter of Tietkens.
- Mount Rennie, named for Professor Rennie of Adelaide University.
- Cleland Hills, named for William Lennox Cleland, a South Australian doctor.

== Route ==
William Tietkens expedition 1889

The attached map shows the main features of the route followed.

== Means of travel ==
The caravan consisted of twelve camels, sufficient to carry the expedition members, provisions for up to four months and water for a lesser period.

== Accomplishments ==
The expedition collected new species of plants and rock samples allowing the South Australian government geologist to compile a 'geological sketch' of the country traversed.

Specimens of 250 plant species were collected, although only 8 were new to science, and in 1890, Ferdinand von Mueller and Ralph Tate named Eremophila tietkensii in his honour.

== Publications ==
The following publications contain information derived from this expedition:

- The Explorers.
- List of Plants collected during Mr. Tietkens' Expedition into Central Australia, 1889.
- Eremophila and allied genera : a monograph of the plant family Myoporaceae.
- A field guide to the eremophilas of Western Australia.

== Manuscript sources ==
- Collection of photographs concerning W. H. Tietkens, 1864-1930, State Library of New South Wales, online copy 31/vol.1, PXB 31/vol.2

== Recognition ==
Tietkens was elected a fellow of the Royal Geographical Society on his return.
