= William Tietkens =

English born Australian explorer

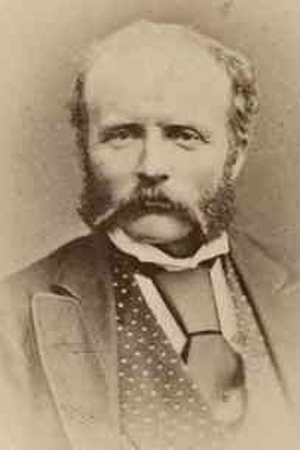
- Born: 30 August 1844
- Died: 19 April 1933 (aged 88); Lithgow
- Occupation: Explorer

William Tietkens expedition 1889

William Harry Tietkens (30 August 1844 – 19 April 1933), known as "Harry Tietkens", explorer and naturalist, was born in England and emigrated to Australia in 1859.

Tietkens was second in command to Ernest Giles on expeditions to Central Australia in 1873 and on a journey from Beltana, South Australia to Perth, Western Australia in 1875.

In 1889 Tietkens led his own expedition west of Alice Springs to the vicinity of the Western Australian border. This expedition discovered Lake Macdonald, the Kintore Range, Mount Leisler, Mount Rennie, the Cleland Hills, defined the western borders of Lake Amadeus, and photographed Uluru (Ayers Rock) and Kata Tjuta (Mount Olga) for the first time. The expedition collected new species of plants and rock samples allowing the South Australian government geologist to compile a 'geological sketch' of the country traversed.

Tietkens was elected a fellow of the Royal Geographical Society on his return. Specimens of 250 plant species were collected, although only 8 were new to science, and in 1890, Ferdinand von Mueller and Ralph Tate named Eremophila tietkensii in his honour.

Tietkens later worked for the New South Wales Department of Lands as a surveyor from 1891 until his retirement in 1909. He died at Lithgow, New South Wales.

== See also ==
- Tietkens expedition of 1889

== Manuscript sources ==
- Collection of photographs concerning W. H. Tietkens, 1864-1930, State Library of New South Wales, online copy 31/vol.1 , PXB 31/vol.2
