= Outstation (aviation) =

Classification of airport in an air carrier's route network

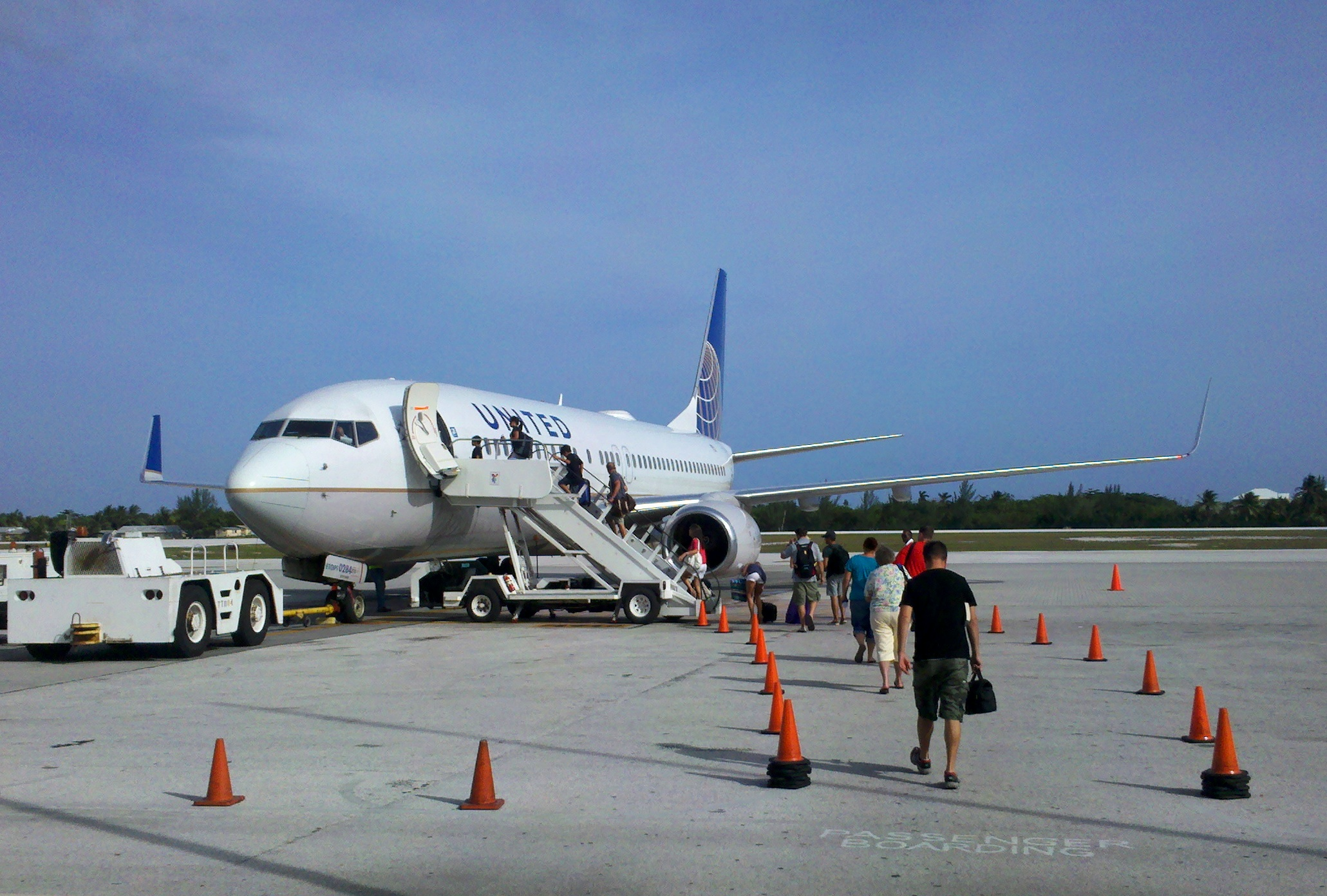
Outstations may lack specialized passenger infrastructure such as jet bridges.

In commercial aviation, an outstation refers to an airport that is served by an air carrier but is not a hub, a focus city, nor a crew or maintenance base in that operator's network. Outstations often, but not necessarily, take the form of regional airports located in exurban or rural communities which handle lower passenger volumes and less-frequent service than hubs. For these reasons, outstations may lack passenger amenities and services which comprise an airline's typical customer experience standards. When an outstation is served by a hub-and-spoke style airline, it is common for its flights to depart early in the morning and arrive late at night due to scheduling patterns directing aircraft to remain-over-night (RON) for maximum fleet utilization.

== Background ==
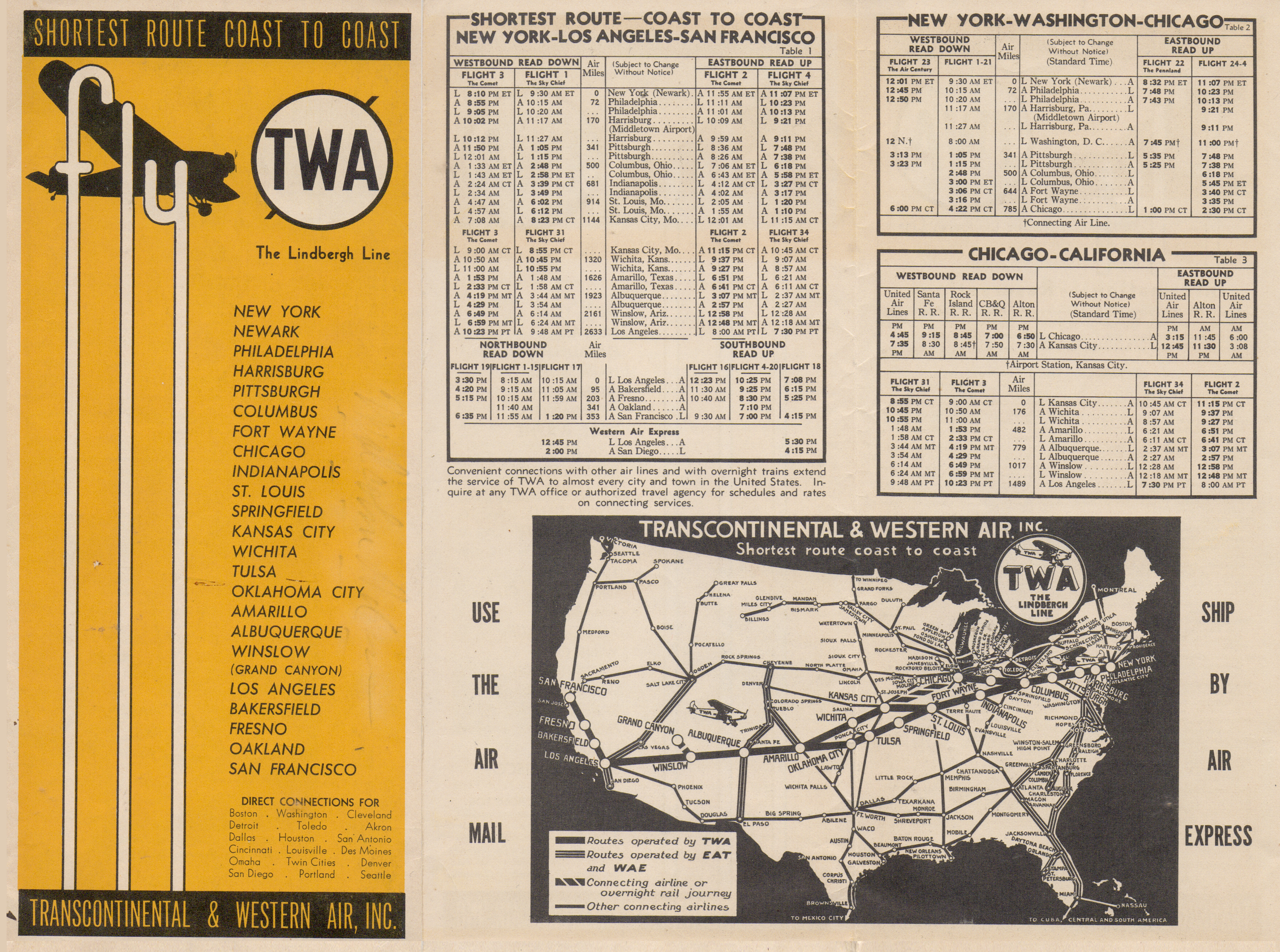
Point-to-point network of TWA, the first transcontinental US airline.

In the early decades of air transportation, passengers and mail were typically transported via point-to-point routes (also known as milk runs). Point-to-point networks typically operated like railroads; they originated and terminated in major bases but made stops at intermediate points along their way. These intermediate cities sometimes featured additional spur routes (operated by the main airline, its partners, or subsidiaries) connecting them with smaller regional outstations, in the same way, that railroads may structure branch lines. Point-to-point service often existed out of necessity; early airliners like the Ford Trimotor and Junkers Ju 52 only featured maximum ranges of around 500–600 nautical miles (930–1,110 km), and early aviation technology was insufficient to provide long-distance navigation and communication capabilities.

Example of a hub-and-spoke airline network

In most modern airline networks, outstations function as the 'spokes' of a hub-and-spoke structure. Passengers departing from these remote locations—all having a wide array of final destinations—can be consolidated on inbound flights to an airline's hub. Upon reaching the hub, they are self-sorted onto connecting flights to their final destinations. While the hub-and-spoke model tends to increase overall travel time due to indirect routing and layovers, it provides passengers with great flexibility and a greater choice in destinations.

== Considerations ==
=== Infrastructure ===
Despite the less-robust presence maintained by air carriers at outstations than at hubs, an outstation still requires a baseline of investment and infrastructure on the carrier's behalf. In other words: air carriers must typically provide for several essential functions in order to reliably serve an airport. These functions include:

==== Line maintenance ====
Aircraft which become damaged or inoperable at an outstation must be made airworthy before returning to service. At outstations where an airline does not employ its own aircraft maintenance technicians, maintenance is performed by contracted personnel. These technicians are trained on the airline's logging procedures and qualified to perform line maintenance functions including troubleshooting, basic servicing of aircraft systems, and deferral of equipment in accordance with Minimum Equipment List procedures.

Outstations are frequently unable to meet needs when an aircraft needs extensive repairs to be put back into service or when an aircraft is unable to fly owing to a system technical problem (AOG). Many air carriers will either reposition inoperable aircraft via ferry flight, or—if a technical issue arises en route to an outstation—divert an inoperable aircraft to a hub or maintenance base.

==== Ground services ====
Air carriers may employ their own ramp crew and ground support equipment at outstations, or they may contract third-parties like Fixed-base operators (FBOs) to handle fueling, de-icing, baggage handling, cabin cleaning, and catering functions.

=== Passenger amenities ===
Carriers sometimes offer fewer passenger amenities in relation to the volume of customers served by an outstation. These amenities commonly include:

- Airport lounges
- First class (due to smaller flights operated by single-cabin regional airliners)
- Jet bridges
