= ANEC III =

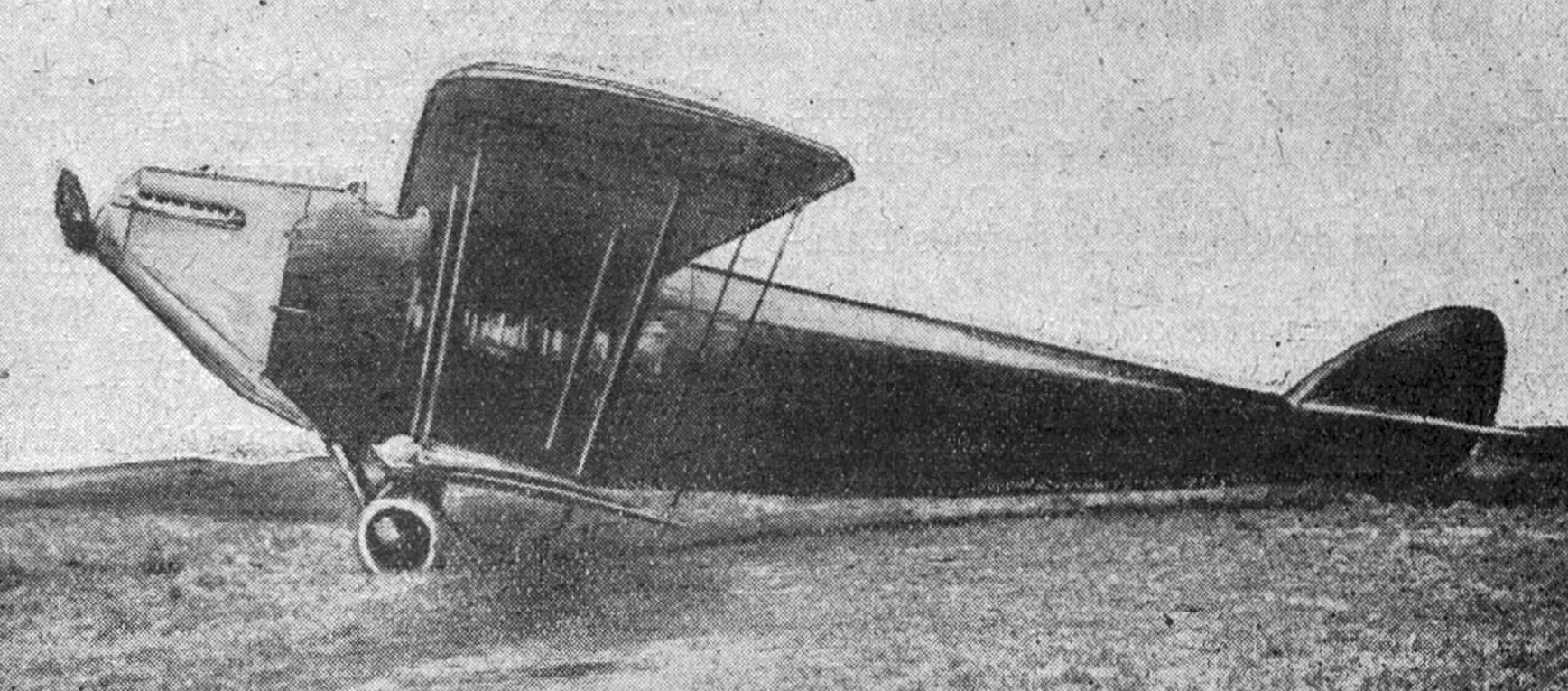

General information
- Type: biplane airliner
- Manufacturer: Air Navigation and Engineering Company Limited
- Designer: John Bewsher
- Primary user: Australian Aerial Services
- Number built: 3

History
- First flight: 1926
- Retired: 1932

The ANEC III was a 1920s British six-seat passenger and mail carrier aircraft built by Air Navigation and Engineering Company Limited at Addlestone, Surrey.

== History ==
Following a requirement for a passenger and mail carrier for the Australian company Larkin Aircraft Supply Company Limited an order was placed for a monoplane airliner designed by George H. Handasyde known as the Handasyde H.2. Handasyde, having no factory of their own, contracted Air Navigation and Engineering to build the aircraft on their behalf. Larkin had decided that the H.2 monoplane could not operate in the heat of Australia, and transferred the contract to supply a new airliner to A.N.E.C. Three ANEC III aircraft were built. The new design was an unequal-span biplane with a Rolls-Royce Eagle IX engine. The pilot sat in the open above the mail compartment, with space for six passengers or cargo inside the fuselage.

The first aircraft flew at Brooklands on 23 March 1926 with the Australian registration G-AUEZ. All three aircraft were crated and shipped to Australia and were operated by Larkin's operating subsidiary Australian Aerial Services. The aircraft were named Diamond Bird, Satin Bird and Love Bird. The three aircraft gave sterling service for a number of years and made a number of important flights in the Australian outback. First registered on 21 May 1927, Satin Bird was used by the wealthy sheepowner William Oliver and his party to tour central Australia that same year, stopping at Oodnadatta, Alice Springs, Farina, Maree, Charlotte Waters, and Simpsons Gap. Satin Bird crashed at Hay on 27 December 1927 and remained inactive until 1929, when it was officially struck from the aircraft registry.

In 1928 the two remaining aircraft were withdrawn from service. Both aircraft were rebuilt as 11-seaters (two pilots plus nine passengers, or the equivalent weight of fuel and cargo) with a lengthened fuselage and a more powerful 485 hp (362 kW) Armstrong Siddeley Jaguar 14-cylinder engine. The re-engined aircraft had an operating range of about 700 kilometres at 140 km/hour.

The converted aircraft were known as the Lasco Lascowl. Both aircraft, still retaining their original names Diamond Bird and Love Bird, were chartered by an aerial survey expedition led by Australian explorer Donald Mackay. The expedition set off on 23 May 1930 to carry out a 67,000-square-mile (170,000 km^{2}) survey of central Australia. Both aircraft returned to Melbourne in July 1930 without a mishap, each having flown more than 300 hours.

The two aircraft were then used on a service between Melbourne and Sydney. Love Bird crashed on 14 July 1931 at Temora and was destroyed in the fire which resulted. The last aircraft Diamond Bird was retired in June 1932 and later scrapped.

== Variants ==
- ANEC III - three built
- Lasco Lascowl - lengthened and re-engined version, two conversions

== Operators ==
Australia
Australian Aerial Services

== Specifications ==
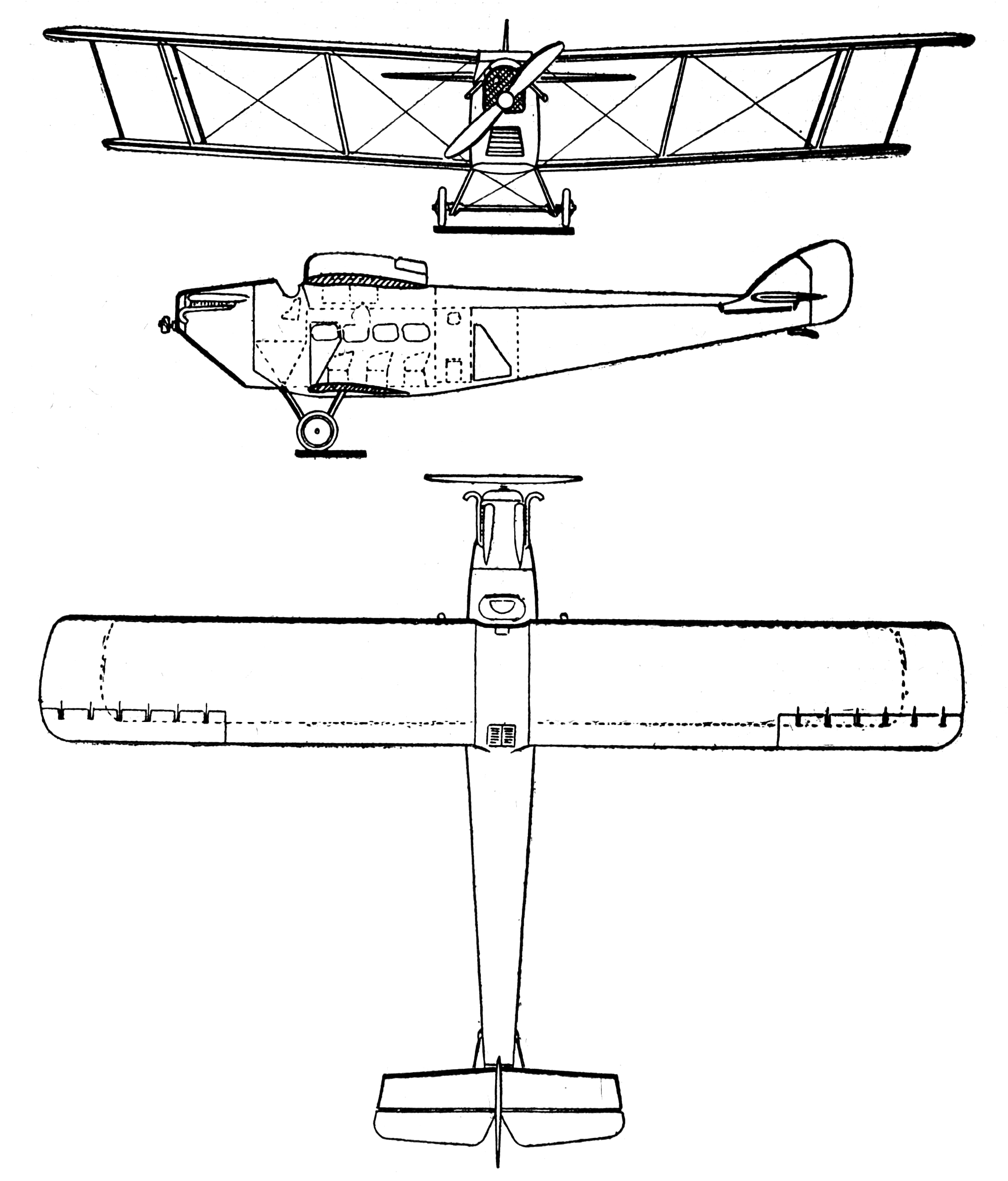
ANEC III 3-view drawing from Les Ailes 29 April 1926

Data from Les Ailes, April 1926. Performance calculated.

General characteristics

- Crew: One
- Capacity: Six passengers
- Length: 45 ft 0 in (13.72 m)
- Upper wingspan: 60 ft 0 in (18.30 m)
- Lower wingspan: 52 ft 0 in (15.86 m)
- Height: 12 ft 10 in (3.90 m)
- Wing area: 732.8 sq ft (68.08 m^{2})
- Empty weight: 3,466 lb (1,572 kg)
- Gross weight: 5,591 lb (2,536 kg)
- Fuel capacity: 90 imp gal; 110 US gal (410 L)
- Powerplant: 1 × Rolls-Royce Eagle IX water-cooled V12, 380 hp (280 kW)
- Propellers: 2-bladed

Performance

- Maximum speed: 105 mph (169 km/h, 91 kn)
- Cruise speed: 90 mph (145 km/h, 78 kn) at 915 m (3,002 ft)
- Stall speed: 49 mph (79 km/h, 43 kn) minimum speed
- Range: 450 mi (724 km, 391 nmi)
- Service ceiling: 14,508 ft (4,422 m)
- Time to altitude: 5.25 min to 915 m (3,002 ft)
