= Air Navigation and Engineering Company =

British aircraft manufacturer

Air Navigation and Engineering Company Limited was a British aircraft manufacturer from its formation in 1919 to 1927.

== History ==
The company was formed in 1919 when the Blériot & SPAD Manufacturing Company Limited was renamed. The company was based at Addlestone Surrey.

The Blériot aircraft company had opened a factory at Addlestone during World War I to make SPAD and Avro aircraft and in 1919 the company became the Air Navigation and Engineering Company Limited. One of the first products was a cyclecar designed by Herbert Jones and W.D. Marchant called the Blériot-Whippet.

In 1922 the company built a 10-seat biplane airliner (the Handasyde H.2) on behalf of the Handasyde Aircraft Company Limited. The company built a number of light aircraft, the first designed by W.S. Shackelton was the ANEC I flying in 1923. The aircraft were built at Addlestone then roaded to Brooklands for flight testing. The company stopped producing aircraft in 1926 and closed in 1927.

== Aircraft designs ==
- ANEC I – (1923) One-engine one-seat ultralight monoplane. Three built
- ANEC II – (1924) One-engine two-seat variant of ANEC I. One built
- ANEC III – (1926) One-engine biplane six-passenger airliner or mailplane. Three built
- ANEC IV – (1926) One-engine two-seat biplane sport aircraft. One built

== Car designs ==
- Blériot-Whippet
- Eric Longden (cyclecar brand)
