= Lake Amadeus =

Lake in Northern Territory in Australia

Lake Amadeus (Pantu)
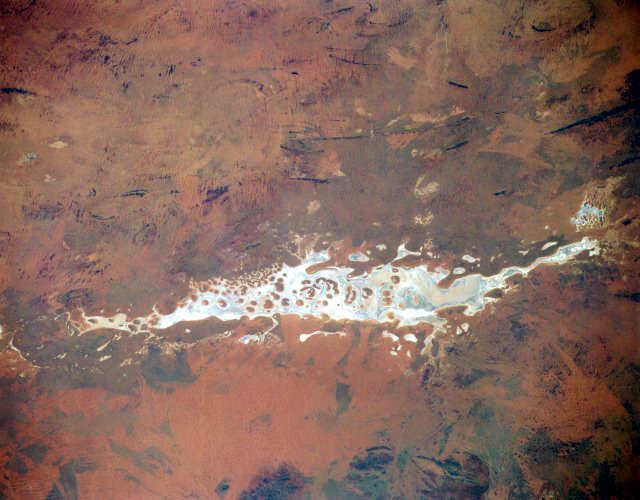
- From space (November 1994)

- Location within Northern Territory
- Location: Petermann, Northern Territory
- Coordinates: 24°45′00″S 130°55′00″E
- Type: Salt lake
- Basin countries: Australia
- Max. length: 180 km (110 mi)
- Max. width: 10 km (6.2 mi)
- Surface area: 1,032 km^{2} (398 sq mi)

Lake Amadeus (together with Lake Neale, Pitjantjatjara: Pantu ("salt lakes") is a large salt lake in the southwest corner of Northern Territory of Australia, about 50 kilometres (31 mi) north of Uluru. The smaller Lake Neale is adjacent to the northwest. It is part of (or a surface feature of) the Amadeus Basin that was filled with the erosion products of the Petermann Orogeny.

== Physical features ==
Due to the aridity of the area, the surface of Lake Amadeus is usually a dry salt crust. While the underground Amadeus Basin flows east to the Pedirka Basin and Warburton Basin, if full, Lake Amadeus would drain west to Lake Hopkins, and then, like Lake Lewis, would flow-on to Lake Macdonald, Lake Mackay, Lake Wills and Lake White before turning east and eventually joining the Victoria River, which in turn flows into the Timor Sea.

Lake Amadeus is 180 kilometres (110 mi) long and 10 kilometres (6.2 mi) wide, making it the largest salt lake in the Northern Territory.

Lake Amadeus contains up to 600 million tonnes of salt; however, harvesting it has not proved viable, owing to its remote location.

== History ==
Lake Amadeus is on Aboriginal land, and is covered by the Katiti and Petermann Aboriginal Land Trusts.

The first European to arrive at the lake, the explorer Ernest Giles, encountered it in 1872. Giles originally intended to honour his benefactor Baron Ferdinand von Mueller with the eponym Lake Ferdinand. However, Mueller prevailed upon Giles to instead honour King Amadeo I of Spain (reigned 1870–1873, known in English as King Amadeus I), who had previously bestowed honour on him. The lake's expanse proved a barrier for Giles, who could see both Uluru and Kata Tjuta but could not reach them as the dry lake bed was not able to support the weight of his horses. The next year, William Gosse climbed and named both rises.

== Mythology ==
Legend describes how pantu was created by wanampi (water snake). As described by late Anangu elder Paddy Uluru, "wanampi had dug out the ground with a stick to form a lake, drew concentric circles in the land".

== See also ==
- List of lakes in Australia
- Post-abdication and legacy of Amadeo of Spain
- Tietkens expedition of 1889
