= Charles Hope Harris =

English surveyor (1846-1915)

Charles Hope Harris FRAS (1846 – 26 June 1915), often referred to as C. Hope Harris, was a surveyor in South Australia, noted for laying out the town of Port Pirie. Lake Harris is named for him.

== History ==
Harris was born in Clare, Suffolk, the fourth son of Congregationalist Rev. Samuel Link Harris (15 January 1807 – 22 January 1894) and Emily Harris (c. 1811 – 27 November 1889), who with their eight children emigrated to South Australia aboard the Asia, arriving at Adelaide in September 1851 and settled in the township of Macclesfield.

He joined the Survey Department as a cadet in the field branch, and was put in charge of a field party in 1865. He spent some time in Melbourne gaining qualifications as a mine surveyor and shire engineer and, duly qualified, began advertising his services as a licensed surveyor in August 1869, operating from an office in Gresham Chambers, King William Street.

In 1871 he was contracted to survey sections of the northern agricultural areas. He laid out the town of Port Pirie on the "spider-web" principle, and also surveyed Laura, Curramulka, Ardrossan, and other towns. He rejoined the Survey Department and in 1874 supervised the trigonometrical survey north-west of Port Augusta, and mapped areas beyond Lake Gairdner, as far as Wilgena, in the process of which he discovered and mapped two previously unrecorded lakes, which by order of Governor Musgrave were named Lake Harris in his honour, and Lake Everard, after the Commissioner of Crown Lands, William Everard.

In 1875, he was transferred to the office staff, engaged on special survey work for the department, which included investigation of sites for the Beetaloo and Barossa reservoirs.

In his last years he was almost totally blind, but with the aid of a young secretary was able to continue exercising his mathematical and curatorial skills.

== Other activities ==
- In 1886, after Strawbridge was promoted to Deputy Surveyor General, Harris was appointed Examiner of Licensed Surveyors' Work, a position he held until the day he died.
- He was the Trigonometrical Computer and Secretary to the Board of Examiners for Surveyors.
- He was a foundation member of the Institute of Surveyors, served as Vice-President for many years. He was the acknowledged authority on variation and dip of the magnetic needle in South Australia, having taken observations and made records for nearly 30 years.
- For 10 years he was lecturer and examiner on surveying at the School of Mines and at Roseworthy College.
- He was a founder of the South Australian branch of the Royal Geographical Society, and its longtime secretary.
- He was a founder of the Astronomical Society of South Australia, and was in 1910 elected a fellow of the Royal Astronomical Society. He made a precise calculation, subsequently verified, for the mass of a comet which appears every 70 years.
- He compiled a reference work on government surveying, which went to a fourth edition in 1914, and a number of pamphlets (listed below) based on his lectures.
- He was an active member of the Clayton Congregational Church, and wrote a 32-page history of the church, published for its jubilee in 1906.
- During leave of absence he familiarised himself with surveying methods in Victoria, New South Wales, and Tasmania.
- For many years he was vice-president of the Kensington Literary Society.
- He was one of the founders of the Surveyors' Institute.
- He had a strong interest in the early history of the State. He and fellow Survey Department officer H. C. Talbot (1850–1924) were acknowledged by Rodney Cockburn, author of Nomenclature of South Australia, for their contribution to the knowledge of origins of placenames, and particularly Aboriginal placenames, for which he was an advocate.

Ignoring the wealth of history and romance wrapped up in the names given by the natives to various natural features and localities, we have obliterated them for the sake of names more dear to viceregal representatives, such as Alice, Caroline, Anna, Joyce, Joanna, Julia, Laura, George, John, and James. Our territorial rights may be equivocal, but this surely does not trouble our conscience so much that we need hasten to destroy every vestige of the people who were once supreme here. We are said to be making history, but are we not lacking in courtesy in effacing the history of a less fortunate people whom we have displaced? . . . . The Romans had a good deal of experience in colonisation, and they were particular to preserve the names of places of the people they conquered. This was ordered upon the ground that names of places chronicle scenes, sights, actions, wisdom, folly, and fate, and are the people's heritage. Camden (A.D. 1856), quoting from Porphyry, a learned Athenian (A.D. 278), notes that barbarous names are emphatic and concise, and considers it the duty of an enlightened people to preserve them, as fixing ideas, images, or conceptions of preceding races. He believes that all native languages are significative; that is, they all have a meaning, and are not mere appellatives. What is here quoted appears to be equally true of names which the Australian aborigines have applied to the distinctive features of their trackless home. It is surely not necessary to close the annals of this in-offensive, simple race. Certainly it is not generous of us to destroy their only records, nor is it wise to exclude from mental view, the panorama of their past.

== Recognition ==
- Mount Harris (also known as Mount Unapproachable), the highest point in Bloods Range, was named for him by Harry Tietkens.
- Lake Harris was discovered by Harris in August 1874, and named for him by Governor Musgrave.

== Publications ==
- Handbook for Government Surveyors the 4th edition (1914).

He also wrote leaflets or booklets on:

- Terrestrial Magnetism
- Variations of the Compass
- Declination of the Magnetic Needle
- Flow of Water
- Limits of Error in Field Work
- Adjustments of Survey Instruments
- Photogrammetry, a paper read before the Science Association (mathematical section) in 1893.
- Geographical Nomenclature of South Australia, a paper read before the Science Association (geographical section) in 1893.
- South Australian Latitudes and Longitudes, a paper submitted at the Science Congress held in Adelaide in January 1907.

He also prepared a comprehensive work on geodesy and practical astronomy (never published), and contributed biographical and historical articles to the Public Service Review, of which he was an editor.

== Family ==
Charles Hope Harris married Margaret Howie (1854–1915) on 30 March 1876. She was the second daughter of Rev. James Howie, of the McLaren Vale Congregational church. Their children were:

- Howie Palmer Harris (1877–1970) married Elizabeth East Dunstan in 1904. He worked for Dunstan Ltd.
- Ethel Marion Harris (1879–1965)
- Mabel Hope Harris (1881–1908)
- Rosalie Margaret Harris (1883–1971)
- Dora Isabel Harris (1885– )
- Russell Hope Harris (1889– ) married Helen Alison Frances Jeffrey in 1916. He worked for Bagot, Shakes & Lewis before WWI, then fought with the 27th Battalion, 1st AIF, in France, was wounded several times and mentioned in dispatches. He was promoted to lieutenant. He resigned in England at war's end rather than be shipped back to Australia, and became a buyer for the American Woolen Company and a US citizen.
- Charles Irvine Harris (1894–1953) married Muriel Blanche Harris (–) in 1928. He served with the 1st AIF in France and was a trombonist in the battalion band.
