= Kingoonya =

Kingoonya South Australia
- Coordinates: 30°55′01″S 135°18′53″E
- Population: 4 (SAL 2021)
- Established: 7 June 1928 (town); 23 October 2003 (locality)
- Postcode(s): 5710
- Elevation: 148 m (486 ft)
- Location: 635 km (395 mi) north-west of Adelaide; 80 km (50 mi) east of Tarcoola; 236 km (147 mi) south of Coober Pedy
- LGA(s): Pastoral Unincorporated Area
- Region: Far North
- State electorate(s): Giles
- Federal division(s): Grey
Localities around Kingoonya:
Wilgena	Wilgena	Wilgena
Wilgena	Kingoonya	Coondambo
Wilgena	Wilgena	Coondambo
- Footnotes: Adjoining localities

Kingoonya, originally spelt Kingoonyah, pronounced (/kɪŋɡuːnjə/ KING-goon-yə), was a small settlement, or township, now almost totally abandoned, in the central outback of the Australian state of South Australia. It was established in 1916 as a railway settlement on the Trans-Australian Railway, mainly to provide refuelling for steam trains and track maintenance services; it also served about 200 families living on sheep grazing properties in the region.

== History ==
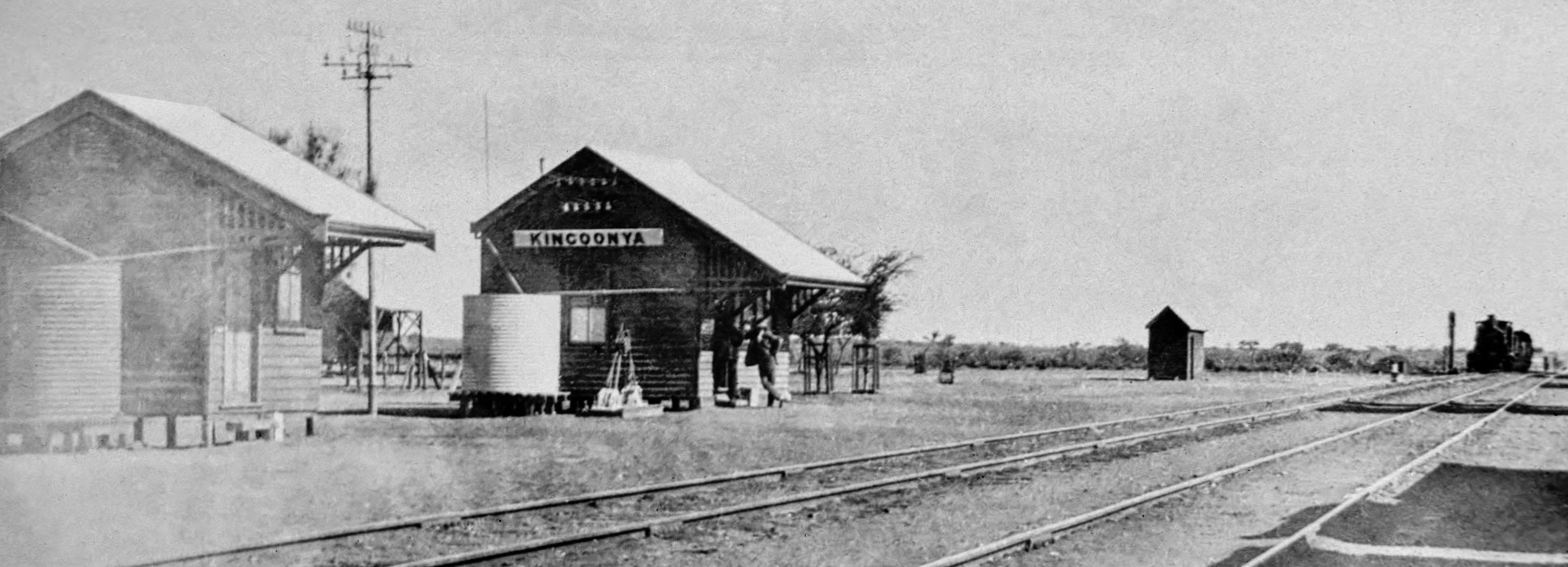
A train arriving at Kingoonya in the 1930s

Indigenous Australians occupied the area for millennia before British settlement.

The Kingoonya Post Office opened about 1884, closed in 1892, reopened in 1915 as the Trans-Australian Railway was constructed, and finally closed in 1982.

The population increased significantly in 1917, when Kingoonya became a medium-sized station on the new Trans-Australian Railway. The prospect of being a key station on a south–north transcontinental route arose in the mid-1920s before lapsing – and being implemented from Tarcoola half a century later. Many workers were employed in supplying water and coal for steam locomotives – water was taken on trains to Barton, 269 kilometres (167 miles) to the west; drinking water came from Port Augusta. From 1951, fewer railway workers were needed at such stations when trains were hauled by diesel-electric locomotives and when, three decades later, low-maintenance concrete sleepers and continuously welded rail were introduced. Railway maintenance was contracted out in the early 1990s, and Kingoonya lost the last of its railway workers and their families. Since then, the few remaining houses in the township have been only intermittently occupied by people involved in mining exploration and kangaroo shooting. Despite the low local population, the Kingoonya Hotel, popular with travellers and residents of several sheep and cattle farming ventures on the surrounding plains, remained in operation as of 2021, offering accommodation and food. The township is often used by off-roaders taking the "permissible" dirt tracks west towards Tarcoola or south past Lakes Everard and Gairdner, and the track to the Eyre Highway across the Nullarbor Plain. There are reputed to be small deposits of black opal in the area, following a child's discovery in 1968 of a rare black rainbow opal in a roadside pit off the main street.

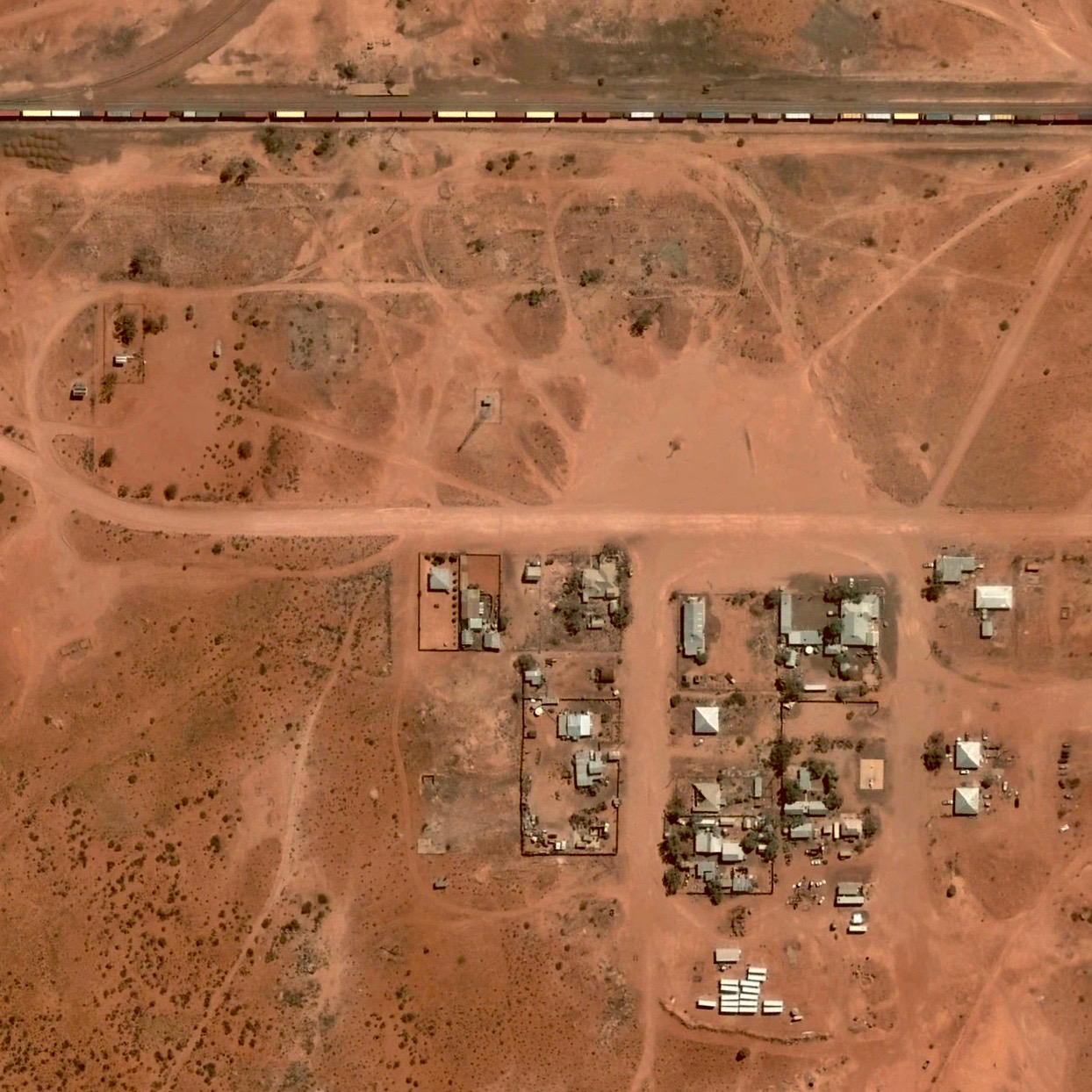
Aerial view of Kingoonya, summer 2020, long after the settlement had almost no permanent residents. The Kingoonya Hotel, open to travellers, is the largest building. An east–west freight train on the Trans-Australian Railway is at the top.

The town has succumbed to rising salt-water and the former sweet-water springs that supplied the town and farms have long since disappeared.

Kingoonya was one of the settlements that was affected by the British Government's nuclear weapons tests in the 1950s at Maralinga, when local indigenous people were forced off their traditional hunting lands. Some settled for a decade or so a few kilometres north of Kingoonya in a makeshift hut settlement, where they had a meagre subsistence, their government payments supplemented by making and selling craft such as spears, boomerangs and woomera throwing sticks to passengers on passing trains. For many years until the 1990s, residents relied on two supply trains for the weekly provision of supplies and mail. Passenger trains – the Indian Pacific running between Sydney and Perth and The Ghan running between Adelaide, Alice Springs and Darwin – no longer stop.

The town was featured on Australia Live, a four-hour broadcast on 1 January 1988 to celebrate Australia's bicentennial year.

== Governance ==
Kingoonya is located within the federal Division of Grey, the state electoral district of Giles, the Pastoral Unincorporated Area of South Australia and the state's Far North region. In the absence of a local government authority, the community in Kingoonya receives municipal services from a state government agency, the Outback Communities Authority.

== Climate ==
Kingoonya has an arid desert climate (Köppen: BWh)

Climate data for Kingoonya
Month	Jan	Feb	Mar	Apr	May	Jun	Jul	Aug	Sep	Oct	Nov	Dec	Year
Mean daily maximum °C (°F)	33.9 (93.0)	32.7 (90.9)	29.4 (84.9)	25.4 (77.7)	20.4 (68.7)	17.1 (62.8)	17.4 (63.3)	19.3 (66.7)	23.5 (74.3)	26.3 (79.3)	29.6 (85.3)	31.8 (89.2)	25.6 (78.0)
Daily mean °C (°F)	27.3 (81.1)	26.4 (79.5)	23.5 (74.3)	19.6 (67.3)	14.9 (58.8)	11.7 (53.1)	11.5 (52.7)	13.1 (55.6)	16.8 (62.2)	19.7 (67.5)	23.0 (73.4)	25.1 (77.2)	19.4 (66.9)
Mean daily minimum °C (°F)	20.5 (68.9)	20.0 (68.0)	17.5 (63.5)	14.1 (57.4)	10.0 (50.0)	7.2 (45.0)	6.5 (43.7)	7.4 (45.3)	10.1 (50.2)	12.9 (55.2)	16.2 (61.2)	18.2 (64.8)	13.4 (56.1)
Average precipitation mm (inches)	15.2 (0.60)	14.3 (0.56)	10.0 (0.39)	19.0 (0.75)	12.5 (0.49)	13.7 (0.54)	7.6 (0.30)	10.9 (0.43)	10.6 (0.42)	17.2 (0.68)	20.2 (0.80)	17.5 (0.69)	168.7 (6.65)
Source: Weather.Directory
