= Acacia auricoma =

Petermann wattle

Conservation status
- Priority Three — Poorly Known Taxa (DEC)

Scientific classification
- Kingdom: Plantae
- Clade: Tracheophytes
- Clade: Angiosperms
- Clade: Eudicots
- Clade: Rosids
- Order: Fabales
- Family: Fabaceae
- Subfamily: Caesalpinioideae
- Clade: Mimosoid clade
- Genus: Acacia
- Species: A. auricoma

Binomial name
- Acacia auricoma Maslin
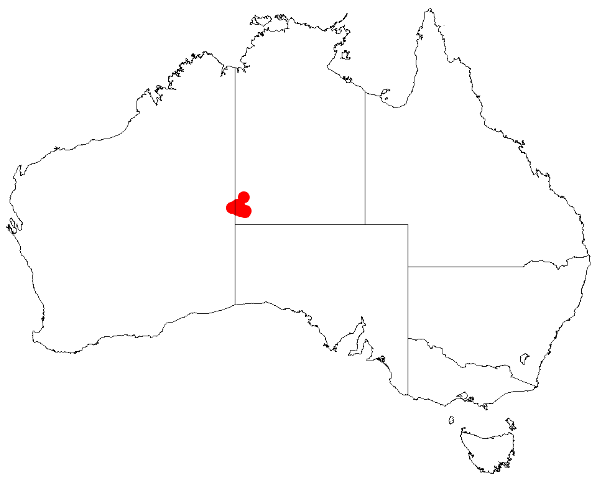
- Occurrence data from AVH

Synonyms
- Racosperma auricomum (Maslin) Pedley

Species of legume

Acacia auricoma, commonly known as Petermann wattle, alumaru or nyalpilintji wattle, is a species of flowering plant in the family Fabaceae and is endemic to an area near the border between Western Australia and the Northern Territory. It is a straggly shrub with leathery elliptic phyllodes, spherical spikes of golden-yellow flowers, and narrowly oblong pods up to 80 mm (3.1 in) long.

== Description ==
Acacia auricoma is a rather straggly, sparsely branched shrub that typically grows to a height of 1.5–3 m (4 ft 11 in – 9 ft 10 in), its new shoots covered with golden-coloured hairs. The phyllodes are leathery, elliptic, 30–100 mm (1.2–3.9 in) long and 15–40 mm (0.59–1.57 in) in diameter with three to five main veins and two to four glands in shallow notches along the upper edges. The flowers are golden-yellow and arranged in one or two spherical heads in axils, each head with 100 to 135 densely packed flowers and 7–8 mm (0.28–0.31 in) in diameter on a peduncle 15–30 mm (0.59–1.18 in) long. Flowering has been recorded from March to May and in August, November and December. The pods are narrowly oblong, firmly papery to thinly leathery, up to 80 mm (3.1 in) long and 15–25 mm (0.59–0.98 in) wide containing dull, dark brown, oblong to elliptic seeds 5.5–6.5 mm (0.22–0.26 in) long with an aril on the end.

== Taxonomy ==
Acacia auricoma was first formally described in 1980 by the botanist Bruce Maslin in the Journal of the Adelaide Botanic Gardens from specimens collected in Bloods Range in the Northern Territory by John Richard Maconochie in 1972. The specific epithet (auricoma) means 'golden hair' or 'golden foliage', referring to the hairs on the new shoots, peduncles, sepals and tips of the petals.

== Distribution ==
Petermann wattle is endemic to a small area near the border between Western Australia and the Northern Territory, from around Anne Range in Western Australia and between the Bloods Range and the Petermann Ranges in the Northern Territory, where it grows on quartzite scree slopes in open shrubland with spinifex, in the Central Ranges and Great Sandy Desert bioregions.

== Conservation status ==
Acacia auricoma is listed as "Priority Three" by the Government of Western Australia Department of Biodiversity, Conservation and Attractions meaning that it is poorly known and known from only a few locations but is not under imminent threat, but as of "least concern" by the Government of the Northern Territory.

== See also ==
- List of Acacia species
