= Lake Harris, South Australia =

Lake Harris South Australia
- Coordinates: 31.11°S 135.22°E
- Population: no data available (2016 census)
- Established: 2013
- Postcode(s): 5600
- Time zone: ACST (UTC+9:30)
  - Summer (DST): ACST (UTC+10:30)
- Location: 530 km (329 mi) north-west of Adelaide
- LGA(s): Pastoral Unincorporated Area
- Region: Far North
- State electorate(s): Giles
- Federal division(s): Grey
Mean max temp	Mean min temp	Annual rainfall
27.6 °C; 82 °F	12.1 °C; 54 °F	172.4 mm 6.8 in
Suburbs around Lake Harris:
Wilgena	Wilgena	Coondambo
Wilgena	Lake Harris	Kokatha
Wilgena	Lake Everard	Kokatha
- Footnotes: Location; Coordinates; Climate; Adjoining localities

Lake Harris is a locality in the Australian state of South Australia located about 530 kilometres (330 miles) north-west of the capital city of Adelaide and which is associated with the lake also known as Lake Harris.

The locality was established on 26 April 2013 in respect to “the long established local name” which is derived from the lake of the same name. The boundary with the adjoining locality of Wilgena was located with the result that the western branch of Lake Harris and the western half of an island named Wallabin Island were located within the former locality. In 2014, the boundary was altered to “ensure the whole of Wallabin Island is within the rural locality of Lake Harris.”

The principal land use within the locality is conservation with the full extent of the locality being occupied by the Lake Gairdner National Park.

Lake Harris is located within the federal Division of Grey, the state electoral district of Giles, the Pastoral Unincorporated Area of South Australia and the state's Far North region.

== See also ==
- Harris Lake (disambiguation)
