= Lake Harris (South Australia) =

Lake in South Australia

- Location in South Australia
- Location: South Australia
- Coordinates: 31.07°S 135.24°E
- Type: Endorheic, salt lake
- Primary outflows: evaporation
- Basin countries: Australia
- Designation: Lake Gairdner National Park
- Max. length: 32 kilometres (20 mi)
- Max. width: 16 kilometres (10 mi)
- Surface area: 300 square kilometres (120 sq mi)
- Islands: “a number of islands”

Lake Harris is an endorheic salt lake in the Australian state of South Australia to the north of the Eyre Peninsula located about 530 kilometres (330 mi) northwest of the state capital of Adelaide within the gazetted localities of Lake Harris and Wilgena.

Lake Harris was named by the Government of South Australia after the surveyor, Charles Hope Harris, who discovered and mapped it in 1874.

Lake Harris is aligned in a north-easterly direction with an overall length of about 32 kilometres (20 mi) and a maximum width of about 16 kilometres (10 mi). It extent includes “a number of Islands” described as being formed from “Quaternary deposits with extensive sand cover”. Its bed consists of “gypsiferous muds, clays and silts with some gypsum crystals” topped with a salt crust of thickness in the range of 30 millimetres (1.2 in) to 75 millimetres (3.0 in), although parts of the lake have a surface with “no identifiable salt crust”. The lake bed contains a dune field of gypsum sands which vegetated with both “low samphire shrubland and tall shrubland with a chenopod shrub understorey”.

Lake Harris along with the nearby lakes of Everard and Gairdner, form the extent of the protected area known as the Lake Gairdner National Park.

== See also ==
- Harris Lake (disambiguation)
- List of lakes of Australia § South Australia

== Citations and references ==
Citations

References

- South Australia. Department for Environment and Heritage (2004), Lake Gairdner National Park management plan (PDF), Department for Environment and Heritage (DEH), ISBN 978-0-7590-1079-6
