= Bloods Range =

Mountain range in central Australia

Coordinates: 24°39′S 129°14′E

Bloods Range (or Blood's Range) is a mountain range in central Australia, stretching roughly east to west across the border between the Northern Territory and Western Australia. It consists of several sets of hills, separated by valleys; the two main valleys are formed by the Hull and Docker Rivers. There are numerous ravines and gorges all throughout the hills. Bloods Range connects with the Petermann Ranges at its western end. In the centre are Mounts Harris (840 m) and Carruthers (1000 m), which are the highest peaks. Further east, the range splits into several branches, including the Rowley Range, McNichol's Range and the Pinyinna Range.

Bloods Range was given its name on 14 March 1874 by the explorer Ernest Giles, when he sighted it from the top of Mount Curdie. He named it for his friend John Henry Smyth-Blood (died 1890) of Beltana, owner of an early pastoral station and pioneer on the OT line. On 12 June 1889, Giles' second-in-command, William Tietkens, returned on his own expedition and surveyed the range. He named the two highest peaks Mount Harris (for surveyor C. H. Harris) and Mount Carruthers. From the top of Mount Harris, he recorded that in the distance could be seen Kata Tjuṯa, the Petermann Ranges and the Tomkinson Ranges. It was later found that Mount Harris had been previously named Mount Unapproachable by Giles.
