= Manpukuji carrot =

The Manpukuji carrot is a variety of carrot known for its unusually long root. Its name derives from the Japanese temple of the same name. The carrot was first grown in Japan during the Edo period, and was on the cusp of extinction in the 1950s but heirloom plant enthusiasts saved it. The roots regularly exceed 3 feet (0.91 m) in length, and have been known to grow as long as 6 feet (1.8 m). Germination takes 12–18 days and maturity is reached in 60–80 days. The appropriate growing conditions are "full sun and moist, well-drained soil." They have a sweet taste and can be consumed fresh, juiced, or salt-baked. The carrot is a key ingredient in the salad dish namasu, which is commonly a part of the Japanese New Year celebration.
