= Goodenia rupestris =

Rock hand-flower

Scientific classification
- Kingdom: Plantae
- Clade: Tracheophytes
- Clade: Angiosperms
- Clade: Eudicots
- Clade: Asterids
- Order: Asterales
- Family: Goodeniaceae
- Genus: Goodenia
- Species: G. rupestris

Binomial name
- Goodenia rupestris Carolin

Species of plant

Goodenia rupestris, commonly known as rock hand-flower, is a species of flowering plant in the family Goodeniaceae and is endemic to the Northern Territory section of the Petermann Ranges. It is an ascending or pendulous perennial herb with crowded elliptic to lance-shaped leaves with the narrower end towards the base, and racemes of yellow flowers.

== Description ==
Goodenia rupestris is an ascending or pendulous herb with stems up to 20 cm (7.9 in) long and foliage covered with woolly hairs. The leaves are crowded at the base of the plant and are elliptic to lance-shaped with the narrower end towards the base, 20–60 mm (0.79–2.36 in) long and about 10 mm (0.39 in) wide. The flowers are arranged in racemes up to 150 mm (5.9 in) long on peduncles 7–10 mm (0.28–0.39 in) long with leaf-like bracts and linear bracteoles 4–5 mm (0.16–0.20 in) long, each flower on a pedicel 5–7 mm (0.20–0.28 in) long. The sepals are linear, 4–5 mm (0.16–0.20 in) long, the petals yellow and about 14–16 mm (0.55–0.63 in) long. The lower lobes of the corolla are 7–8 mm (0.28–0.31 in) long with wings about 1.5 mm (0.059 in) wide. Flowering mainly occurs around August and the fruit is an elliptic capsule about 6 mm (0.24 in) long.

== Taxonomy and naming ==
Goodenia rupestris was first formally described in 1980 by Roger Charles Carolin in the journal Telopea from material he collected between the Hull and Docker Rivers in the Petermann Ranges in 1966. The specific epithet (rupestris) means "rocky".

== Distribution and habitat ==
This goodenia grows in crevices on cliffs in the Northern Territory part of the Petermann Ranges.

== Conservation status ==
Goodenia rupestris is classified as "data deficient" under the Northern Territory Government Territory Parks and Wildlife Conservation Act 1976.
