= Harris Lake =

Harris Lake or Harris Lake may refer to:

- Harris Lake (McDougall), a lake in McDougall, Ontario
- Harris Lake (Kenora District), a lake in Kenora District, Ontario
- Harris Lake (Boucher Township, Thunder Bay District), a lake in Thunder Bay District, Ontario
- Harris Lake (Dorion), a lake in Dorion, Ontario
- Harris Lake (Cochrane District) a lake in Cochrane District, Ontario
- Harris Lake (Wallbridge Township, Parry Sound District), a lake in Parry Sound District, Ontario
- Harris Lake (Timiskaming District), a lake in Timiskaming District, Ontario
- Harris Lake (Berrien County, Michigan)
- Harris Lake (New Hill, North Carolina)
- Harris Lake (Highlands, North Carolina)
- Thomas Lake Harris, an American spiritualistic prophet and poet
- Lake Harris (Florida)
- Harris Lake (New York), a lake in the Adirondacks that empties into the Hudson River
  - Lake Harris Campground on Harris Lake, New York
- Lake Harris (South Australia), a lake in the Far North region of South Australia
  - Lake Harris, South Australia, a community established on the shore of Lake Harris
- Lake Harris (New Zealand), a lake in the region West Coast in New Zealand
- Lake Wedowee, Alabama, also called R. L. Harris Reservoir, or Harris Lake
