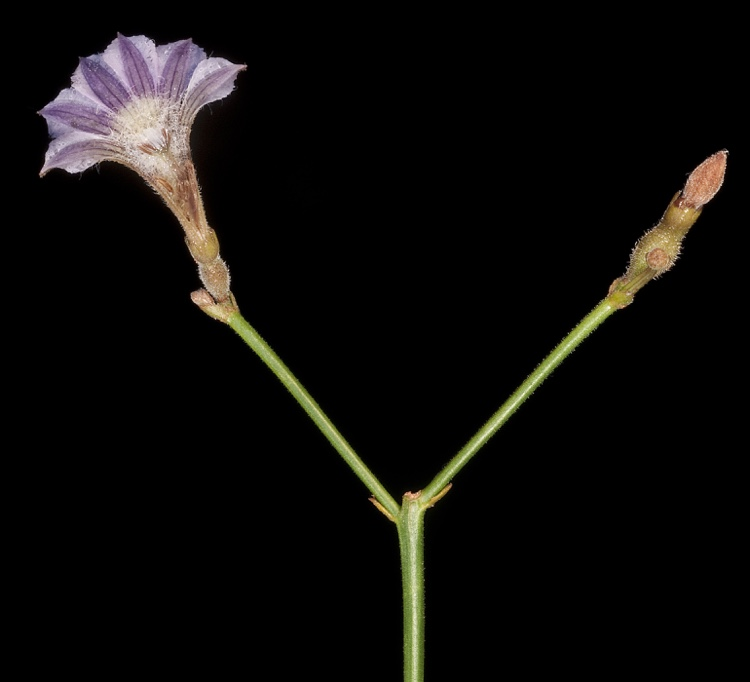
- Near the Tjukayirla Roadhouse

Scientific classification
- Kingdom: Plantae
- Clade: Tracheophytes
- Clade: Angiosperms
- Clade: Eudicots
- Clade: Asterids
- Order: Asterales
- Family: Goodeniaceae
- Genus: Scaevola
- Species: S. basedowii

Binomial name
- Scaevola basedowii Carolin
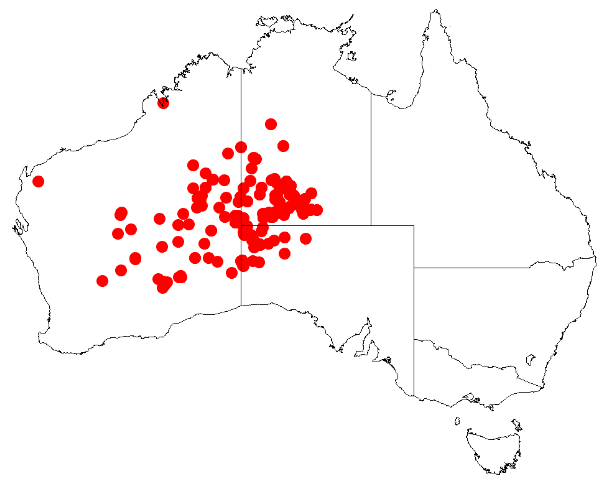
- Occurrence data from Australasian Virtual Herbarium

= Scaevola basedowii =

Species of plant

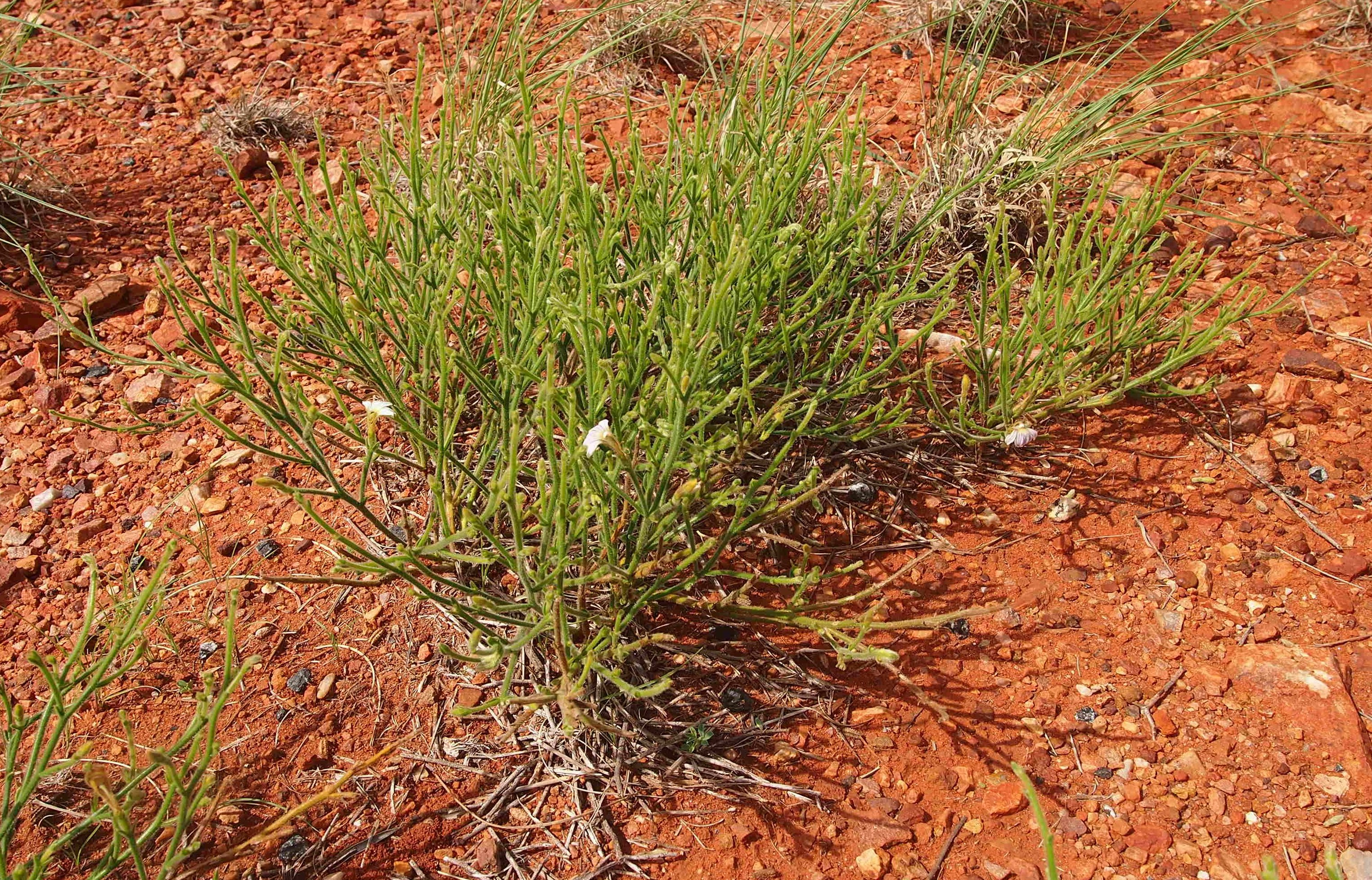
Habit

Scaevola basedowii, commonly known as Basedow's fanflower and as akwen-akwene or kwenpaye in the Kaytetye language, is a species of flowering plant in the family Goodeniaceae and is endemic to inland areas of Australia. It is a stiff, erect perennial herb with many stems, sessile, narrowly elliptic leaves at the base of the plant and more or less triangular stem leaves, pale mauve or white flowers with darker lines, and ribbed, hairy, spherical to elliptic fruit.

== Description ==
Scaevola basedowii is an erect, perennial herb with many stems and which typically grows to a height of 20–60 cm (7.9–23.6 in), and often spreads by cloning. The stems are striated and covered with glandular hairs and long, stiff, simple hairs. The leaves at the base of the plants are sessile, narrowly elliptic, up to 22 mm (0.87 in) long and 6 mm (0.24 in) wide and the stem leaves are more or less triangular and up to 4 mm (0.16 in) long. The flowers are arranged in thyrses or racemes up to 15 cm (5.9 in) long on peduncles 17–55 mm (0.67–2.17 in) long with leaf-like bracts and egg-shaped to elliptic bracteoles 1–2 mm (0.039–0.079 in) long. The sepals are triangular, 0.2–0.35 mm (0.0079–0.0138 in) long and joined at the base. The petals are usually pale mauve with darker lines or white with brownish lines, 15–25 mm (0.59–0.98 in) long with stiff hairs pressed against the outside, and bearded inside. Flowering mainly occurs from May to September and the fruit is spherical to elliptic, 5 mm (0.20 in) long, ribbed and hairy.

== Taxonomy ==
Scaevola basedowii was first formally described in 1980 by Roger Carolin from a specimen collected on Mount Unapproachable by Herbert Basedow in 1926. The specific epithet (basedowii) honours the collector of the type specimen.

== Distribution and habitat ==
This species of Scaevola occurs in central Australia in Western Australia, the Northern Territory and South Australia. In Western Australia it is found in the Central Ranges, Gibson Desert, Great Sandy Desert, Great Victoria Desert, Little Sandy Desert, and Murchison bioregions. It occurs in the Burt Plain, Central Ranges, Finke, Gibson Desert, Great Sandy Desert, Great Victoria Desert, MacDonnell Ranges, and Tanami bioregions of the Northern Territory, and in the Central Ranges and Great Victoria Desert in South Australia. It grows on red sand dunes or desert flats, often with Triodia basedowii and Allocasuarina decaisneana.

== Conservation status ==
Scaevola basedowii is listed as "not threatened" by the Western Australian Government Department of Biodiversity, Conservation and Attractions, and as of "least concern" in South Australia and in the Northern Territory under the Territory Parks and Wildlife Conservation Act.
