= Mount Unapproachable =

Mountain in Petermann, Northern Territory, Australia

- Location within Northern Territory

Highest point
- Elevation: 505 m (1,657 ft)
- Coordinates: 24°20′00″S 130°05′00″E

Geography
- Location: Petermann, Northern Territory, Australia

Mount Unapproachable is an isolated mountain in the Northern Territory of Australia located in the locality of Petermann on the northern side of Lake Neale in the territory's southwest. It is about 505 metres (1,657 ft) above sea level. The area is remote: the nearest towns are Kaltukatjara some 116 kilometres (72 mi) away, Kintore some 135 kilometres (84 mi) away and Yulara 138 kilometres (86 mi) away. The mountain is mostly made of sandstone.

Unapproachable was named by the explorer Ernest Giles in 1872, whilst on an expedition across central Australia. He had just sighted and named Lake Amadeus, and could see the mountain rising to the west. He hoped to find water at the mountain, but was unable to approach it, as his path was blocked by the lake. Giles in fact over-estimated the size of Lake Amadeus and missed the bridge of land between Amadeus and Lake Neale.

In 1889, Giles' second-in-command, William Tietkens, returned on his own expedition to survey the area. In his journal, Tietkens wrote that he first travelled to the Bloods Range, to the south of Lakes Amadeus and Neale. He named the highest peaks Mount Harris (for surveyor C. H. Harris) and Mount Carruthers. From the top of Mount Harris, he could see Kata Tjuṯa, the Petermann Ranges and the Tomkinson Ranges. Tietkens then travelled eastward for three days, and reached Lake Amadeus. At the western end of the lake and on the north shore, he described a sandstone range, which he named Long's Range after his brother-in-law. He climbed a nearby set of hills, and identified Mount Unapproachable as the westernmost peak of the Long's Range. He reported that his team reached Unapproachable around the middle of June and then spent several days travelling around the western edge of Lake Amadeus. He corrected Giles' earlier mistake and successfully mapped the lake's western shore.

Another team of surveyors visited the area in 1926, led by Donald Mackay and Herbert Basedow. On 1 July, they climbed a hill that, after comparing his own observations with those of Giles and Tietkens, Basedow identified as both Mount Unapproachable and Mount Harris. Basedow concluded that this hill was the Mount Unapproachable that Giles had described, and that Tietkens had mistakenly renamed it Mount Harris. On modern maps, however, Mount Harris and Mount Carruthers are indeed the names given to two peaks in the Bloods Range.

== See also ==
- List of mountains of the Northern Territory
