= Olia Chain =

Coordinates: 25°29′S 130°10′E

The Olia Chain (or The Olias) is a small mountain range in the southwest of the Northern Territory, Australia. It forms the southeastern end of the Petermann Ranges and their connection with the Musgrave Ranges further south. The Olia Chain consists of scattered outcrops of rocky hills, separated and surrounded by sandy plains. It extends from Katamala Cone (828 m) at its northern end to Mantarur (including Butler's Dome, 1102 m) in the south. The centre of the chain is dominated by Stevenson Peak (1025 m). A few kilometres northeast of this peak is a Pitjantjatjara outstation, Pirrulpakalarintja.

The Olia Chain mostly consist of flat-topped ridges composed of sandstone, slate, quartzite, and limestone rock beds.

== See also ==
- Musgrave Ranges
- Petermann Ranges
