= Prostanthera ammophila =

Sand mintbush

Scientific classification
- Kingdom: Plantae
- Clade: Tracheophytes
- Clade: Angiosperms
- Clade: Eudicots
- Clade: Asterids
- Order: Lamiales
- Family: Lamiaceae
- Genus: Prostanthera
- Species: P. ammophila

Binomial name
- Prostanthera ammophila B.J.Conn
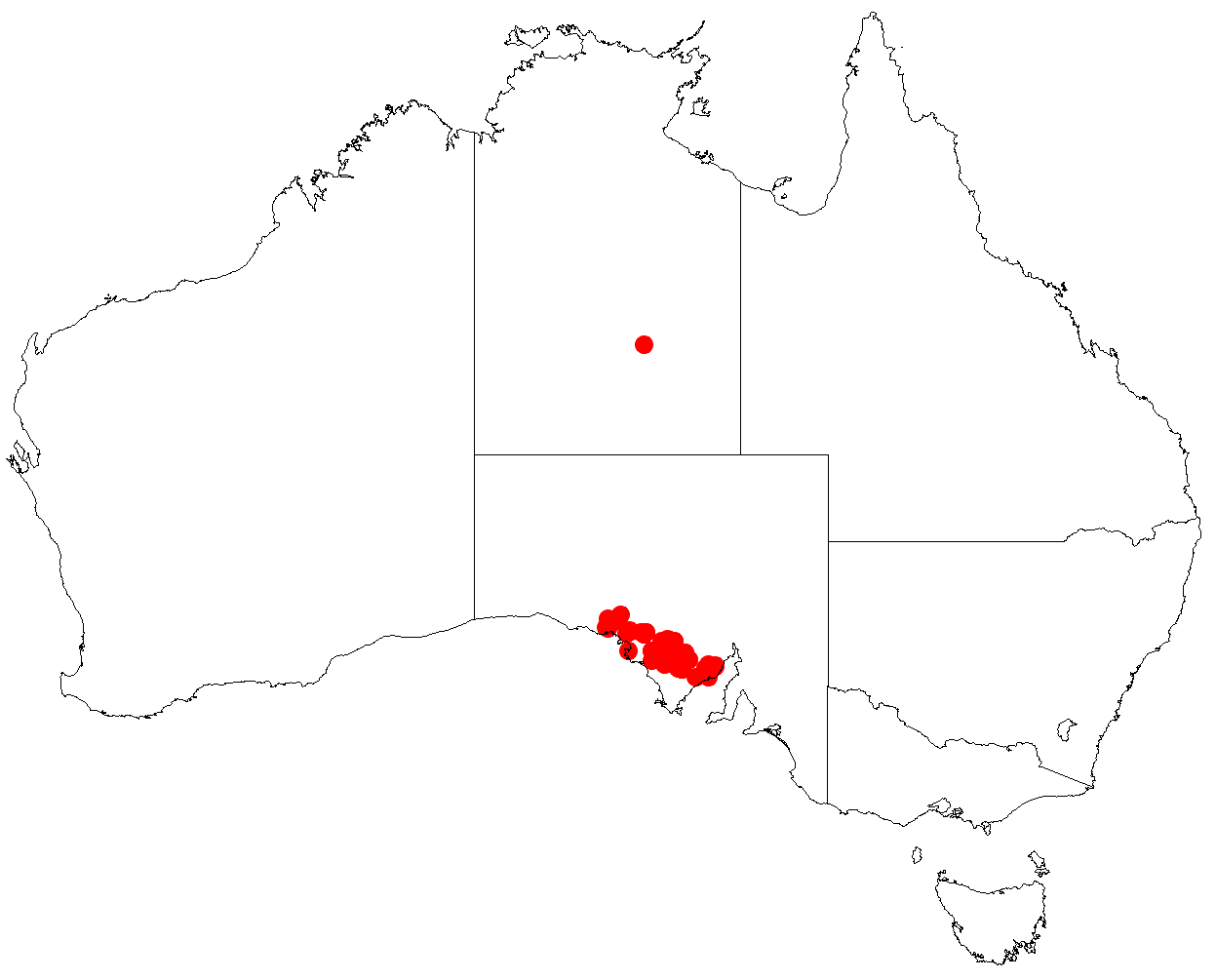
- Occurrence data from AVH

Species of flowering plant

Prostanthera ammophila, commonly known as sand mintbush, is a species of flowering plant in the family Lamiaceae and is endemic to southern areas of South Australia. It is an erect to spreading shrub with egg-shaped to narrow elliptical leaves and white and purple to mauve flowers with yellow spots inside.

== Description ==
Prostanthera ammophila is an erect to spreading shrub that typically grows to a height of 0.6–1.7 m (2 ft 0 in – 5 ft 7 in) with densely hairy, silvery-green stems. The leaves are egg-shaped to narrow elliptical, silvery green to light green, 7–13 mm (0.28–0.51 in) long and 2.5–5.5 mm (0.098–0.217 in) wide and sessile. The flowers are arranged singly in six to twelve upper leaf axils, each flower on a pedicel 1–2 mm (0.039–0.079 in) long. The sepals are green with a mauve to purple tinge and form a tube 2.5–4 mm (0.098–0.157 in) long with two broadly egg-shaped lobes, the lower lobe 2–3.5 mm (0.079–0.138 in) long and 2.5–3.5 mm (0.098–0.138 in) wide, the upper lobe 4–8 mm (0.16–0.31 in) long and 4–7.5 mm (0.16–0.30 in) wide. The petals are 13–15 mm (0.51–0.59 in) long, white near the base and purple to mauve nearer the tip with yellow spots inside and fused to form a tube 7–9 mm (0.28–0.35 in) long. The lower lip has three lobes, the centre lobe spatula-shaped, 3–7 mm (0.12–0.28 in) long and 2.5–5 mm (0.098–0.197 in) wide and the side lobes 2.5–6 mm (0.098–0.236 in) long and 2–4 mm (0.079–0.157 in) wide. The upper lip has two lobes 3–5.5 mm (0.12–0.22 in) long and 4.5–8.5 mm (0.18–0.33 in) wide.

== Taxonomy ==
Prostanthera ammophila was first formally described in 1988 by Barry Conn in the journal Nuytsia from specimens collected near Yardea Station in 1969.

== Etymology ==
The species epithet, ammophila, is derived from the Greek: ammos (sand), and philos (loving) to give the adjective: ammophilus,-a,-um, which describes the plant as "sand-loving or as "growing in sandy soil.

== Distribution and habitat ==
This mintbush grows on sand dunes and on rocky hills in the Gawler Ranges and Eyre Peninsula in South Australia.
