= Challenger mine =

Mine in South Australia

Challenger
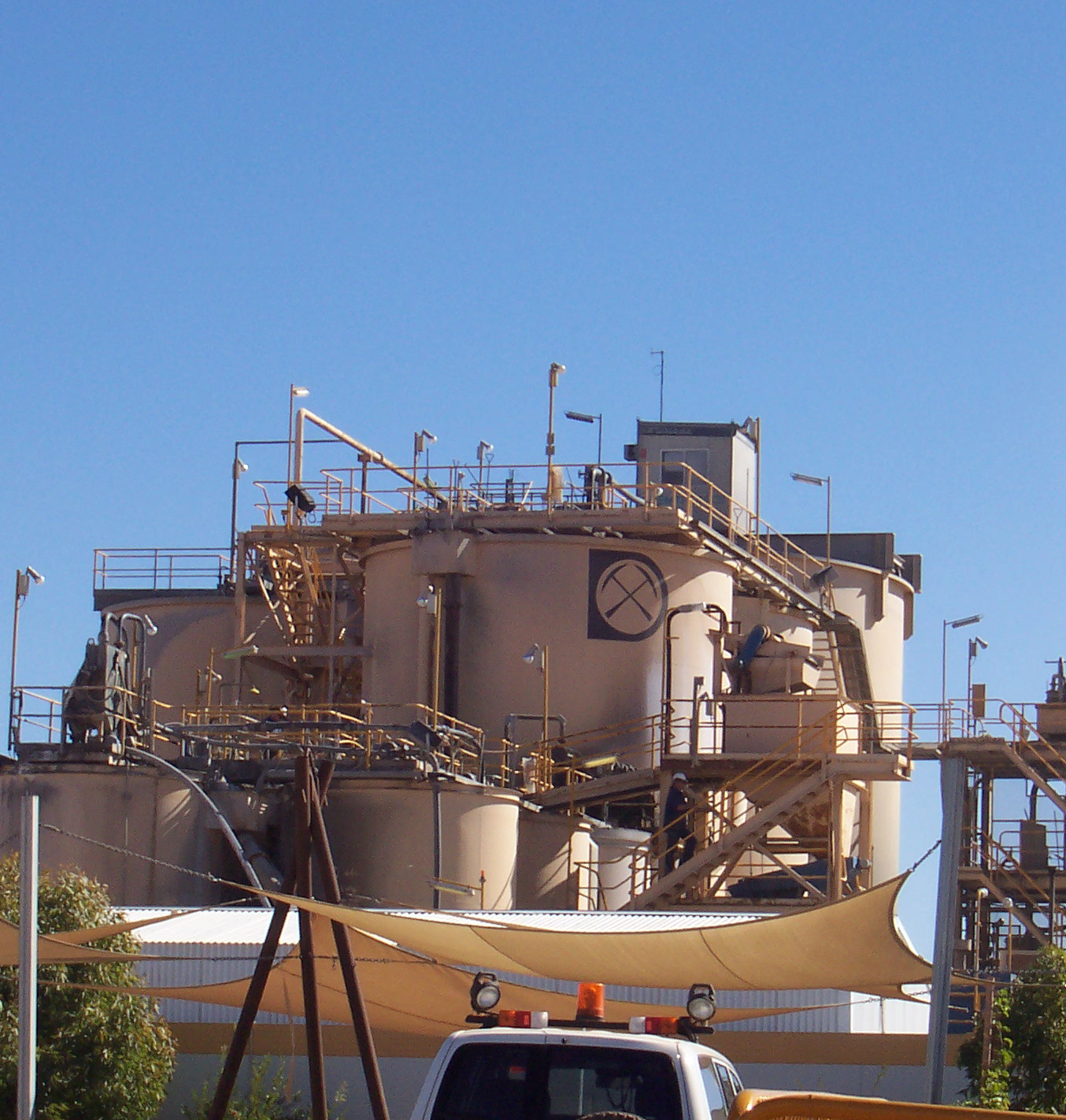
- The plant at the minesite

- Location in Australia

Location
- Location: South Australia, Australia; 29°52′36″S 133°35′11″E

Production
- Production: 66,216
- Financial year: 2012-13

History
- Opened: 2002

Owner
- Company: WPG Resources
- Website: wpgresources.com.au/projects/challenger-gold-project/
- Acquired: 2011

The Challenger mine is a gold mine in the Far North of South Australia, 165 km west of the Stuart Highway and 740 km north-west of Adelaide. It was operated by Dominion, Kingsgate and then WPG Resources. The mine is now in care and maintenance. The deposit was named by David Edgecombe, the geologist who discovered it, after his dog.

== History ==
The ore body was discovered in early 1995 by Dominion Mining. It was found by using the relatively new method of sampling calcrete (calcium carbonate laterite). Broad sample spacing of 800m fortuitously "snagged" the sub-surface orebody with a single high gold in calcrete value attracting almost immediate follow-up. The top of the orebody was beneath less than metre of transported cover and calcrete. Exploration drilling commenced in mid-1995 and continued for several years on a campaign basis. The initial drilling programs intersected high grade ore but were unable to consistently hit the ore zones at depth.

Further drilling and detailed structural interpretation of the drill core lead to the orebody being defined as several tightly folded linear shoots, plunging at about a 45 degree angle. As yet, the bottom of the ore body has not been discovered, although there are several faults offsetting the orebody. The project was Joint-ventured with Samantha-Resolute in late 1995. Activities stopped during the late 1990s while Dominion negotiated to buy back Resolute's share of the project and then find another Joint-venture partner. Dominion was unable to find a Joint-venture partner and so in 2001 the company decided to develop the mine itself. The mine was initially an open pit, commencing in 2002 and converted to underground mining in 2005.

== Geology and mineralisation ==
The Challenger deposit is located within portions of Christie gneiss, a member of the Mulgathing Complex that forms part of the Gawler craton, a large crystalline basement province consisting of late Archaean to Mesoproterozic rocks that became stabilised by around 1,450 Ma. The deposit occurs within quartz-feldspar-biotite ± garnet-cordierite gneiss, a variation of Christie gneiss. The host to gold mineralisation is a silica and feldspar rich greisenised pegmatite. These veins are typically ptygmatically folded. The deposit is typically shear hosted with the morphology of the mineralised envelope being lensoid in three dimensions and anastomosing in character.

Coarse visible gold of variable size and in association with sulphide mineralisation is a common feature of the higher grade ore zones. Gold grains contain inclusions of arsenopyrite, pyritised pyrrhotite and native bismuth.

All lodes remain open at depth and historical drilling of the M1 lode has demonstrated the continuity of the orebody to at least 2.8 km down-plunge. Both primary host rock and the quartz, feldspar, garnet veins associated with gold mineralisation are generally competent, necessitating minimal ground support. Underground conditions are effectively dry with little groundwater inflow into the mine.

The mine had an estimated reserve of 512,000 ounces of gold from a resource of 1 million ounces of gold at June 2007. Mineral resource estimate on 30 June 2017 was 1,621,000 Tonnes of ore at a grade of 6.99 g/t for 364,000 oz gold.

HWE Mining was appointed the mining services contractor in 2004.

Byrnecut Mining Australia has been the underground mining contractor since 2017.

== Nature of facility ==
Challenger Gold Mine is an underground gold mine and processing facility. The infrastructure covers an area of approximately 300 hectares (740 acres) and includes the processing plant, a mine village housing up to 140 personnel working a fly-in /fly-out roster, aerodrome, reagent and fuel storage facilities, offices, workshops, a laboratory, ancillary buildings and haul roads. Water is supplied from a process water bore field located approximately 3 kilometres (2 mi) west of Challenger. A diesel power station (PS1), supplies power to the treatment plant, and village. A secondary diesel power station (PS2) supplies power to the underground mine and surface ventilation fan.

The mine lease is located in the Far North of South Australia, 750 kilometres (470 mi) north-west of Adelaide within the Woomera Prohibited Area on the Jumbuck Pastoral Company lease. The site is either accessed by a nine-hour drive along sealed and unsealed roads or by Air which takes approximately 1.5 hours by plane from Adelaide. The main access road is a private road and runs approximately 170 kilometres (110 mi) west from the Stuart Highway. The project has changed hands several times, with Kingsgate taking over the project from Dominion in 2010, followed by WPG Resources in 2015. WPG appointed voluntary administrators, then receivers and managers in July and August 2018. The Challenger Mine has stopped operations and gone into care and maintenance.

== Production ==
Production figures of the recent past were:

Year	Production	Grade	Cost per ounce
2005-06	108,080 ounces	9.52 g/t	A$280
2006-07	108,191 ounces	9.66 g/t	A$309
2007-08	109,326 ounces	8.35 g/t	A$367
2008-09	98,755 ounces	7.54 g/t	A$438
2009-10	80,570 ounces	5.0 g/t	A$697
2010-11	96,645 ounces	4.3 g/t	A$786
2011-12	87,388 ounces	4.6 g/t	A$1,397
2012-13	66,216 ounces	3.9 g/t	US$2,030
2013-14	74,954 ounces	4.8 g/t	US$1,504
