= Mount Curdie =

Mountain in the Northern Territory, Australia

- Location within Northern Territory

Highest point
- Elevation: 958 m (3,143 ft)AHD
- Coordinates: 25°3′S 129°25′E

Naming
- Etymology: Dr Daniel Curdie

Geography
- Location: Northern Territory, Australia
- Parent range: Petermann Ranges

Climbing
- Easiest route: Hike

Mount Curdie is a mountain in the Northern Territory of Australia, with an altitude of 958 metres (3,143 ft) AHD. It is the highest peak in the Curdie Range, which is a section of the Petermann Ranges. The mountain is located on the southern bank of the Hull River, about 40 kilometres (25 mi) southeast of Kaḻṯukatjara. The Great Central Road passes nearby to the north. At the base of the mountain is the valley through which the Hull River flows. The valley contains a place known to local Aboriginal people as Tjunti, where Lasseter's Cave is located.

Ernest Giles named Mount Curdie on 13 March 1874, during his first journey through the Petermann Ranges. He named it after Dr Daniel Curdie, a subscriber to Giles' fund for his expedition. After climbing to the top of Mount Curdie, Giles also gave names to other peaks in the Petermann Ranges, including Mounts Fagan and Miller further to the east.

== See also ==
- List of mountains of the Northern Territory
