= Tarcoola, South Australia =

Tarcoola
- Town
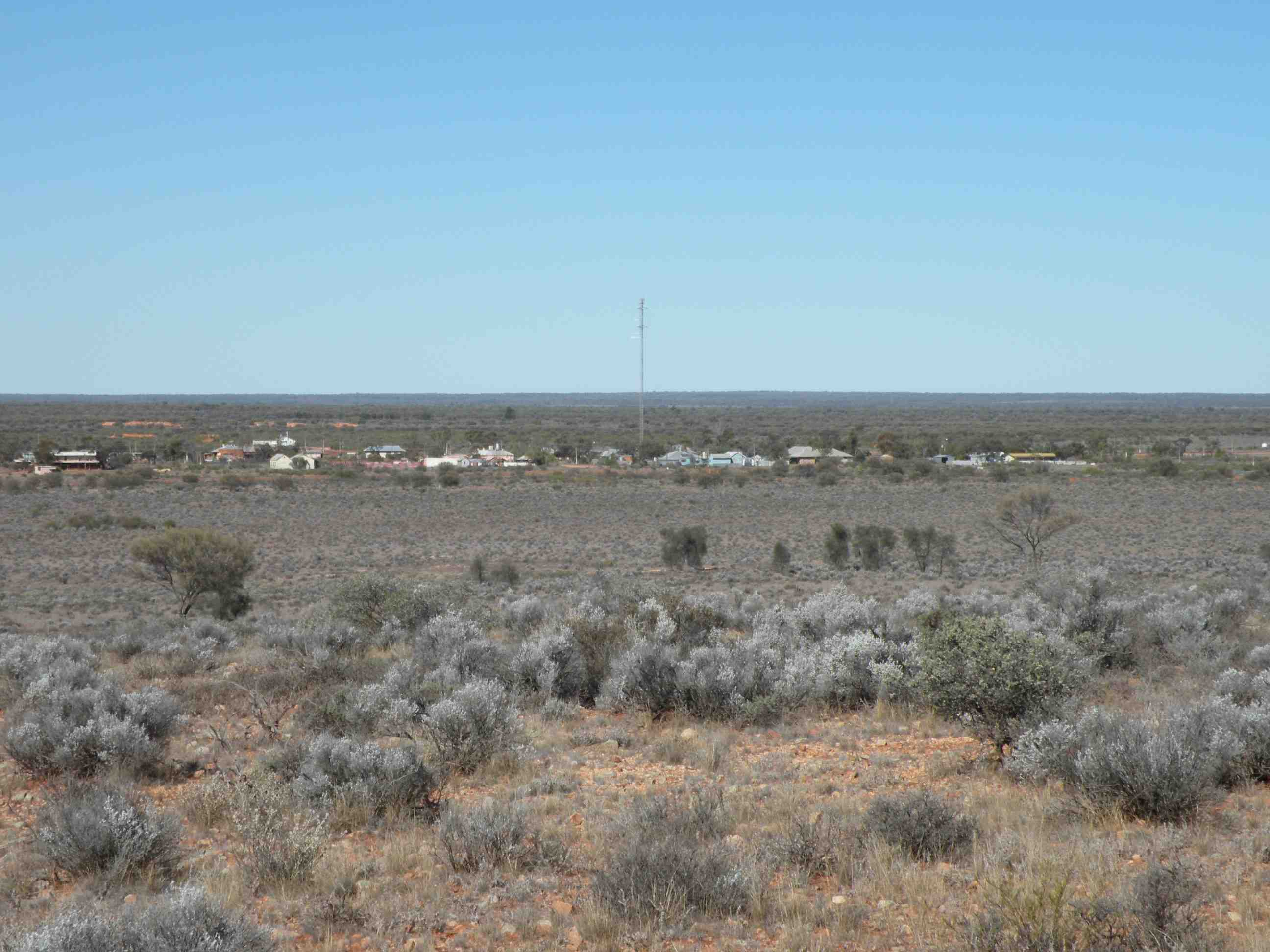
- Tarcoola in 2012

- Coordinates: 30°41′41″S 134°33′22″E
- Country: Australia
- State: South Australia
- Region: Far North
- LGA: Pastoral Unincorporated Area
- Location: 602 km (374 mi) NW of Adelaide central business district; 416 km (258 mi) NNW of Port Augusta
- Established: 21 February 1901 (town); 29 July 2004 (locality)

Government
  - State electorate: Giles
  - Federal division: Grey
- Elevation (airport): 123 m (404 ft)

Population
  - Total: 0 (2016 census)
- Time zone: UTC+9:30 (ACST)
  - Summer (DST): UTC+10:30 (ACST)
- Postcode: 5710
- Mean max temp: 27.5 °C (81.5 °F)
- Mean min temp: 12.0 °C (53.6 °F)
- Annual rainfall: 182.7 mm (7.19 in)
Localities around Tarcoola
Wilgena	Wilgena	Wilgena
Wilgena; Mulgathing	Tarcoola	Wilgena
Mulgathing	Mulgathing	Wilgena

Tarcoola is a town in the Far North of South Australia 416 kilometres (258 mi) north-northwest of Port Augusta. At the 2016 census, Tarcoola had no people living within its boundaries.

Tarcoola was named after Tarcoola the winner of the 1893 Melbourne Cup horse race. The horse Tarcoola had been raised on Tarcoola Station on the Darling River in New South Wales. It means river bend in the aboriginal language of the area around that Tarcoola Station.

== History ==
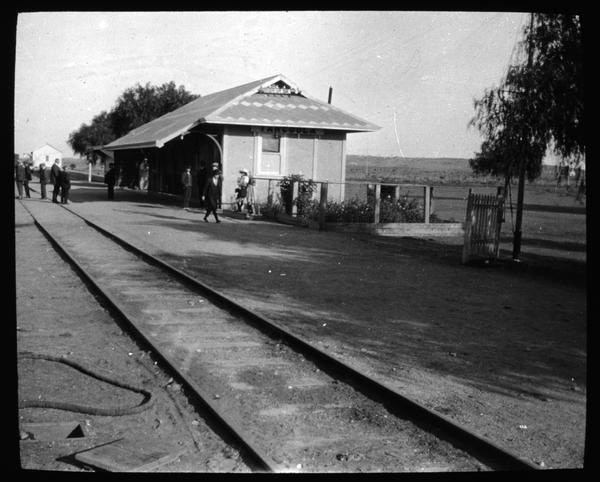
Tarcoola railway station, between 1926 and 1940

Tarcoola lies on Kokatha land. The Tarcoola Goldfield was discovered and named in 1893, but it was in an isolated arid area, and there was little development until 1900. A Post Office opened on 18 August 1900 and the town was proclaimed on 21 February 1901.

The goldfield's heyday was from about 1901 to 1918. A government battery was built to process ore from small mines. Between 1901 and 1954 the field produced about 77,000oz (2.4 tonnes) of gold, most of it from the Tarcoola Blocks mine.

The Trans-Australian Railway was built through Tarcoola in 1915, and in 1980 it became a junction station when the Darwin railway line diverged from Tarcoola to Alice Springs. The link from Alice Springs through to Darwin was eventually completed in 2004.

The town is almost completely deserted today except for transient railway maintenance staff and geological exploration teams. The original Tarcoola goldfields are long closed. However, there is now new exploration for minerals in the wider area, including the Challenger mine.

The Tarcoola Goldfield, Battery and Township is listed on the South Australian Heritage Register as a designated place of archaeological significance.

In 2017, WPG Resources commenced mining an open pit at Tarcoola intending to mine for at least two years, and transport the ore to the Challenger mine for processing in the facilities there.

== Transport ==
=== Rail ===
Tarcoola is now best known as the northern junction of the Trans-Australian Railway and the Darwin line.

The Ghan and the Indian Pacific passenger services through Tarcoola both run once per week in each direction all year round, and twice per week at various times. The mail for Tarcoola arrives by train.

== Governance ==
Tarcoola is located within the federal division of Grey, the state electoral district of Giles and the Pastoral Unincorporated Area of South Australia.

== Climate ==
Tarcoola has a desert climate with hot, dry summers and mild winters and sparse rainfall throughout the year. A record high temperature of 49.7 °C was recorded on 30 January 2026.

Climate data for Tarcoola Aero (1997–2020); 123 m AMSL; 30° 42′ 18.36″ S
Month	Jan	Feb	Mar	Apr	May	Jun	Jul	Aug	Sep	Oct	Nov	Dec	Year
Record high °C (°F)	49.7 (121.5)	48.2 (118.8)	44.0 (111.2)	39.7 (103.5)	34.2 (93.6)	28.7 (83.7)	30.0 (86.0)	34.8 (94.6)	39.0 (102.2)	42.9 (109.2)	46.5 (115.7)	48.1 (118.6)	49.7 (121.5)
Mean daily maximum °C (°F)	36.8 (98.2)	35.3 (95.5)	31.7 (89.1)	27.2 (81.0)	22.4 (72.3)	18.8 (65.8)	19.0 (66.2)	21.2 (70.2)	25.5 (77.9)	28.6 (83.5)	31.7 (89.1)	34.3 (93.7)	27.7 (81.9)
Mean daily minimum °C (°F)	19.8 (67.6)	19.1 (66.4)	16.2 (61.2)	12.3 (54.1)	8.1 (46.6)	5.2 (41.4)	4.6 (40.3)	5.7 (42.3)	9.0 (48.2)	12.2 (54.0)	15.4 (59.7)	17.6 (63.7)	12.1 (53.8)
Record low °C (°F)	5.6 (42.1)	9.1 (48.4)	6.1 (43.0)	1.3 (34.3)	0.0 (32.0)	−3.8 (25.2)	−4.5 (23.9)	−3.1 (26.4)	−0.1 (31.8)	1.0 (33.8)	5.0 (41.0)	7.8 (46.0)	−4.5 (23.9)
Average precipitation mm (inches)	12.1 (0.48)	23.0 (0.91)	17.4 (0.69)	12.6 (0.50)	10.7 (0.42)	13.1 (0.52)	10.8 (0.43)	13.0 (0.51)	9.8 (0.39)	16.5 (0.65)	20.3 (0.80)	19.8 (0.78)	179.1 (7.08)
Average precipitation days (≥ 0.2 mm)	2.6	2.8	3.2	4.0	4.9	5.8	4.7	5.3	3.2	4.8	4.8	4.0	50.1
Source: Australian Bureau of Meteorology
