= Harris Lake (Berrien County, Michigan) =

- Location within Michigan
- Location: Berrien County
- Coordinates: 42°13′22″N 86°21′23″W
- Type: lake
- Surface area: 21.427 acres (8.671 ha)

Harris Lake is a lake in Berrien County, in the U.S. state of Michigan. The lake is 21.427 acres (8.671 ha) in size.

Harris Lake was named after Benjamin Harris, a pioneer who settled at the lake in 1850.
