= Lake Everard =

Lake in South Australia

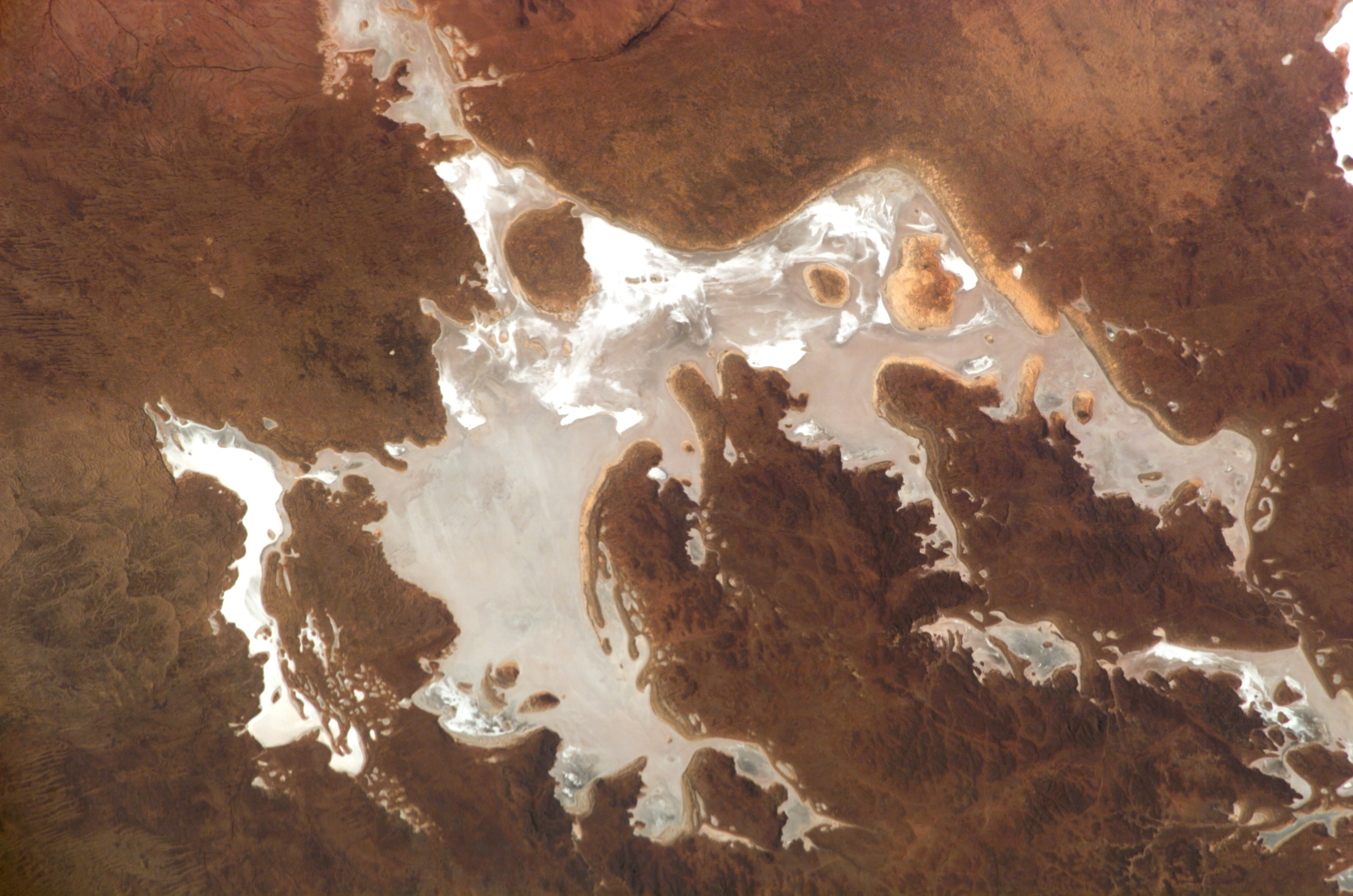
- Satellite image

- Location in South Australia
- Location: Central South Australia
- Coordinates: 31°25′S 135°06′E
- Type: Endorheic, salt lake
- Basin countries: Australia
- Designation: Lake Gairdner National Park
- Max. length: 68 km (42 mi)
- Max. width: 43 km (27 mi)
- Surface area: 858 km^{2} (331 sq mi)

Lake Everard is an endorheic salt lake in South Australia, Australia. The lake, along with Lake Gairdner and Lake Harris form Lake Gairdner National Park.

The lakebed of Lake Everard is generally salt crust, however, parts of the lake is saline clay with no salt crust.

The lake was named after William Everard.
