= Lake Gairdner National Park =

National park in South Australia

- IUCN category VI (protected area with sustainable use of natural resources)
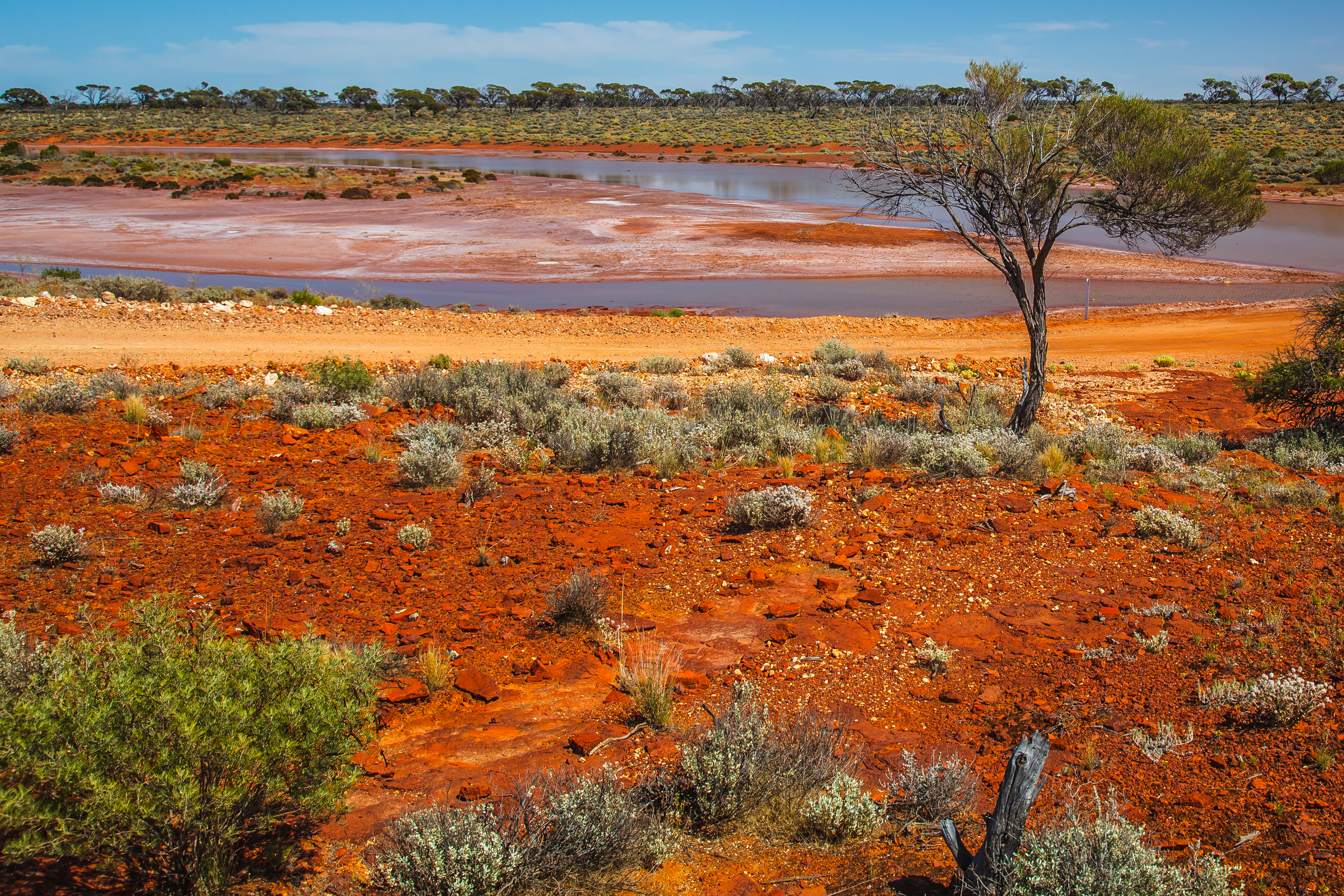
- Lake Gairdner National Park

- Location within South Australia
- Location: South Australia
- Nearest city: Woomera
- Coordinates: 31°41′50″S 135°51′13″E
- Area: 5,531.77 km^{2} (2,135.83 sq mi)
- Established: 19 December 1991
- Governing body: Department for Environment and Water
- Website: Official website

Lake Gairdner National Park is a protected area associated with Lake Gairdner in South Australia (Australia), 436 km northwest of Adelaide. It is located just south of the Trans-Australian Railway, Stuart Highway, and the Woomera Prohibited area.

The national park consists of the following salt lakes (from east to west) - Lake Gairdner, Lake Harris and Lake Everard. Ordinarily, the country is totally arid, and devoid of free water, surface or underground. In the summer, it can be extremely hot. In the springtime, however, this country has great attraction for birdwatchers and botanists.

There is generally very limited public access to this park, which is surrounded by pastoral leases. The easiest public access is from the main road running from Yardea to Kingoonya, at The Brothers Well, a concrete catchment at the side of the road at the southern end of Moonaree Station (though the road signs would have you believe that you were on Yardea Station). The road is dirt, but quite good enough for two-wheel drive vehicles unless it is wet, when it is likely that it will be closed by the Highways Dept..

This region is the home country of the Kokatha people, and traces of their occupation may still be found: sacred sites are still visited for ceremonies. The national park also contains the historic Glenloth Gold Battery Site, located at its western end on the shore of Lake Harris, which is listed on the South Australian Heritage Register as a designated place of archaeological significance.

== See also ==
- Protected areas of South Australia
