= WPG Resources =

- Formerly: Western Plains Gold
- Traded as: ASX: WPG
- Industry: Mining
- Founded: 2004
- Defunct: 2018
- Headquarters: Sydney, Australia
- Products: Gold
- Revenue: $81 million (2017)
- Operating income: ($4 million) (2017)
- Net income: ($9 million) (2017)
- Website: www.wpgresources.com.au

WPG Resources (formerly Western Plains Gold) was a mining company focusing on exploration, evaluation and development of gold and coal projects in South Australia.

Western Plains Gold was founded in 2004 and listed on the Australian Securities Exchange (ASX) on 23 August 2005. The company was placed in receivership on 8 August 2018. It was delisted from the ASX on 3 February 2020.

The company operated the Challenger underground gold mine and 650,000 tonnes per annum capacity mill at Tarcoola, South Australia, and the Perseverance open pit mine 130 km to the southeast.

== Port Pirie iron ore export proposal ==
The company purchased land and proposed to construct an enclosed iron ore stockpiling and associated loading facilities at Port Pirie on the eastern shore of Spencer Gulf, South Australia. The loading method proposed was transshipment by barge to waiting Cape or Panamax vessels.

In 2011, the company sold iron ore assets to OneSteel. The assets included the Peculiar Knob iron deposit, located in the Woomera Protected Area. In November 2014, the company announced that it would sell its land at Port Pirie to help fund its gold development projects.

== Diversification ==
In 2014, Tunkillia and Tarcoola gold projects were acquired by WPG Resources, marking the completion of the company's transition from an iron ore explorer to a diversified exploration and mining company. In 2015, WPG had a portfolio of exploration projects in South Australia covering a combined area of 5,373 square kilometres, including advanced gold projects. Targeted commodities included gold, nickel, base metals, iron ore and coal.
