= Lake Gairdner =

Salt lake in South Australia

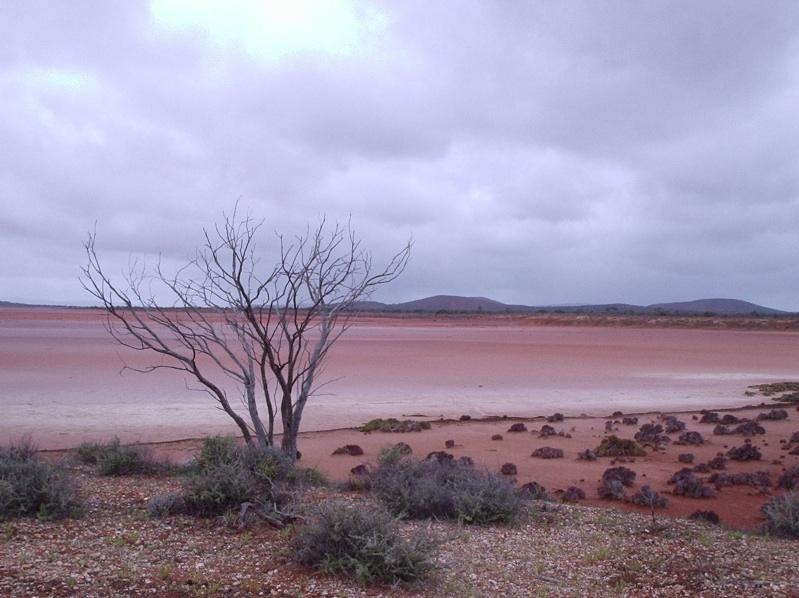
- Extreme southern reaches of Lake Gairdner

- Location in South Australia
- Location: Central South Australia
- Coordinates: 31°34′S 136°00′E
- Type: Endorheic, salt lake
- Basin countries: Australia
- Designation: Lake Gairdner National Park
- Max. length: 160 km (99 mi)
- Max. width: 48 km (30 mi)
- Surface elevation: 121 m (397 feet)

Lake Gairdner is a large endorheic salt lake in the Australian state of South Australia, to the north of the Eyre Peninsula. When in flood, the lake is considered the third largest salt lake in Australia.

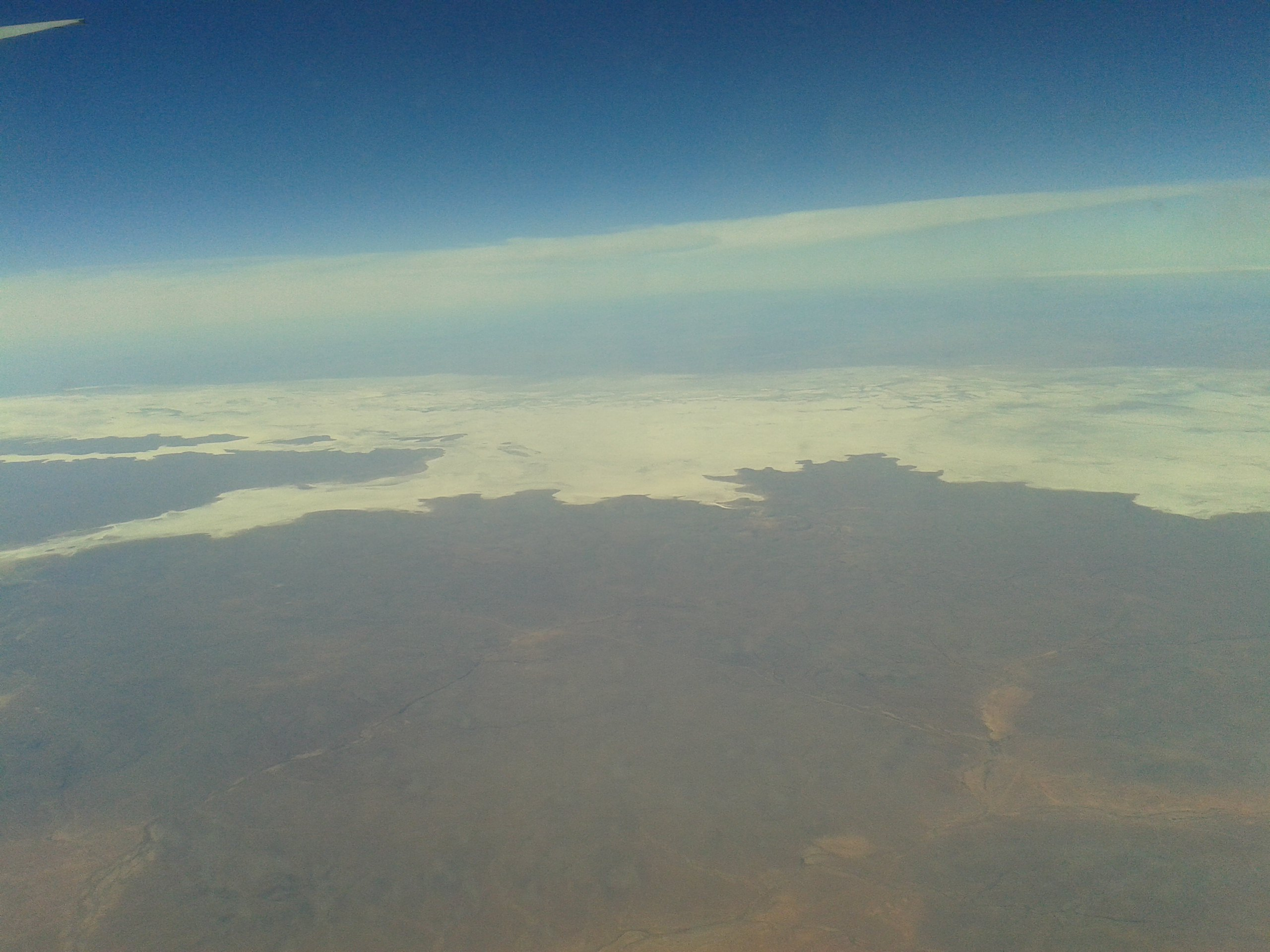
Lake Gairdner, as viewed from the air.

== Description ==
Lake Gairdner is located about 440 kilometres (270 mi) northwest of the state capital of Adelaide and about 150 kilometres (93 mi) northwest of Port Augusta in the foothills on the northern side of the Gawler Ranges and to the west of Lake Torrens.

The lake is over 160 km (99 mi) long and 48 km (30 mi) across with salt over 1.2 metres (3 ft 11 in) thick in some places.

Lake Gairdner was named by the Governor of South Australia, Richard MacDonnell in October 1857 after Gordon Gairdner, a chief clerk of the Australian Department in the Colonial Office.

Lake Gairdner along with Lake Everard and Lake Harris form the extent of the Lake Gairdner National Park. The lakes were all once part of an inland sea that stretched all the way to the Gulf of Carpentaria.

Six ephemeral creeks feed the lake, including Garden Well Creek, Gorge Creek and Yeltabinna Creek.

The land occupying the extent of Lake Gairdner was gazetted as a locality by the Government of South Australia on 26 April 2013 under the name "Lake Gairdner".

== Land speed record attempts ==
Speed Week 2009

Lake Gairdner has been the site of various land speed record attempts on its salt flats. Since 1990 it has been the location for the annual Speed Week event run by the Dry Lakes Racers Australia, where drivers of various types of vehicles aim to break land speed records. Over six days in March 2025, 72 new speed records were set, with the event attracting over 1000 visitors.

== See also ==
- List of lakes of Australia § South Australia
