= Salt crust =

Cooking method

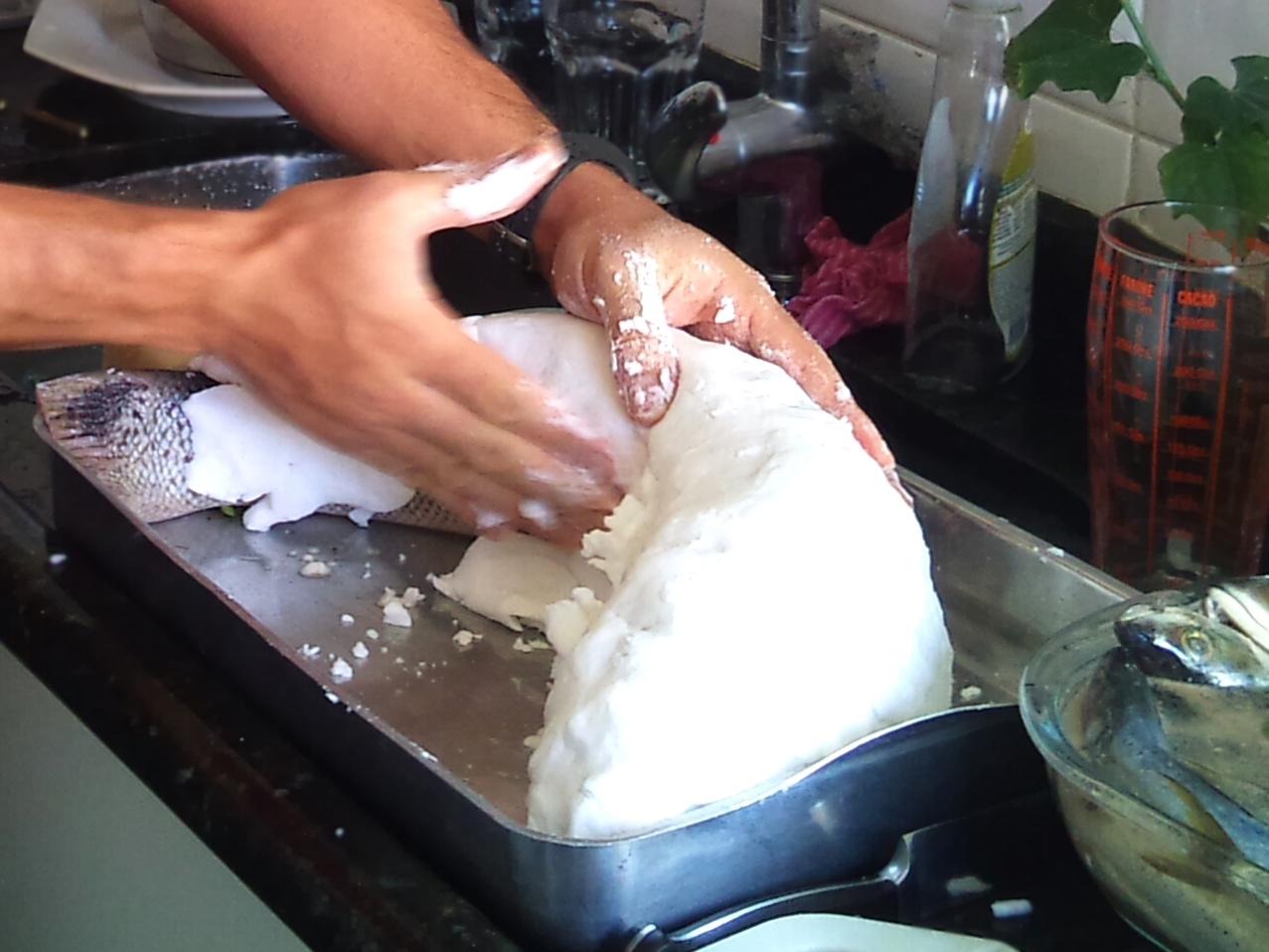
Fish in salt crust being prepared

A salt crust is a method of cooking by completely covering an ingredient such as fish, chicken or vegetables in salt (sometimes bound together by water or egg white) before baking. The salt layer acts as insulation and helps cook the food in an even and gentle manner. After baking, the salt crust is cracked and discarded, revealing the moist and evenly cooked food.

== Technique and foods ==
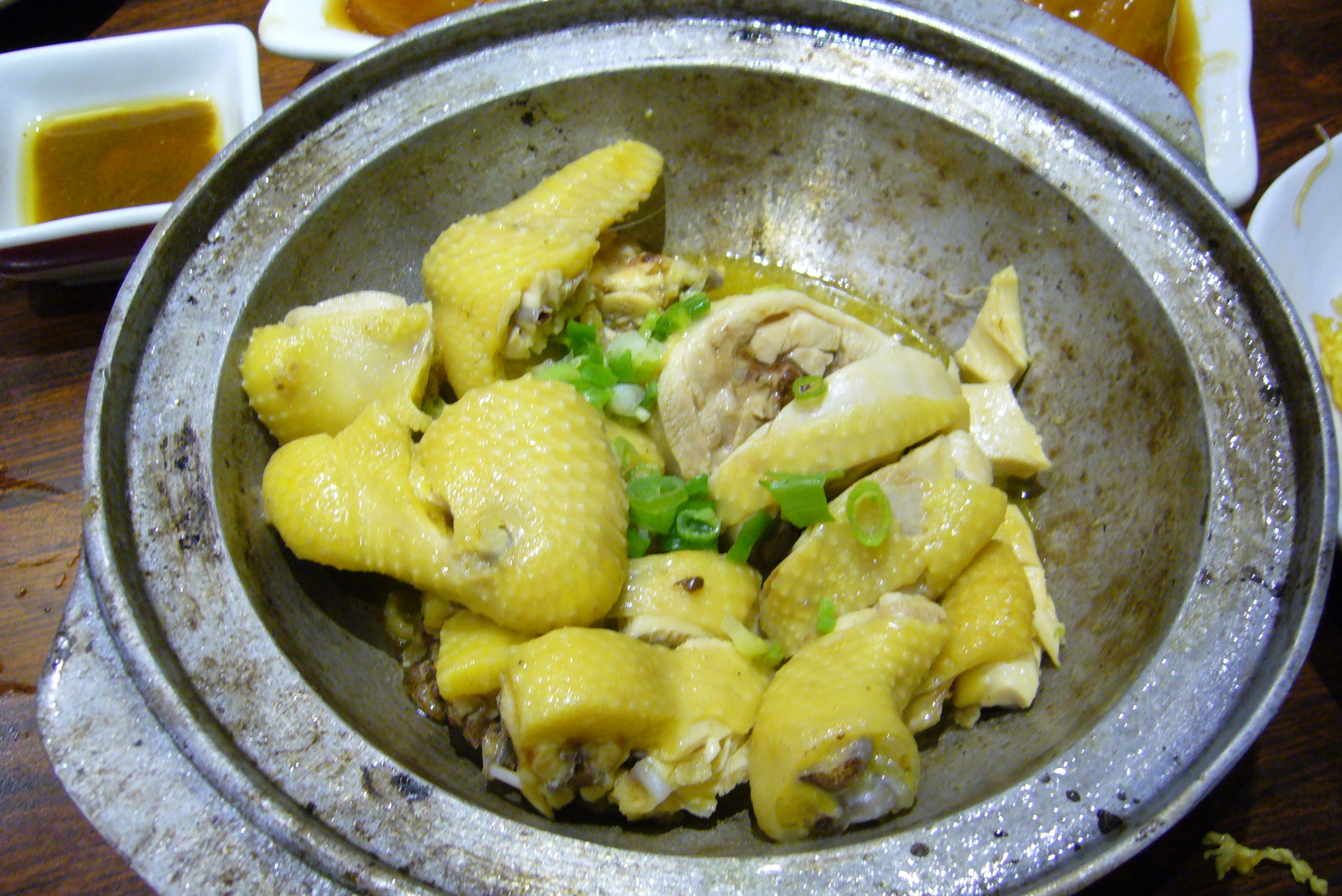
Salt-baked chicken with the salt crust removed, ready for serving

Typically delicate foods such as fish, chicken/poultry or vegetables are cooked using this method. In each case the aim is to lock in moisture, protect the food from drying, ensure even cooking, and maximise the flavour.

The salt crust can be created simply by adding a sufficient quantity of coarse or fine salt to cover the food item. Water may be sprayed on top, to help the salt form a hard crust. Alternatively, the salt may be mixed with egg white to form a pliable paste.

Baking typically occurs in an oven at around 200 °C (390 °F), with the salt crust acting as a cooking vessel. This slows heat transfer to the food creating a slow and low dry oven, beneficial to most proteins.

To serve, the crust is broken and carefully removed, to avoid leaving excess salt residue in the food.

Steak can also be cooked using a similar method rather than broiling it and risk the loss of its juices. Coating a pan with salt and cooking the steak, ideally approximately an inch thick or less, on top yields a more moist and flavourful cut. The pan is heated until the salt crackles and steaks cooked with this method usually involves a crispy crust made of the salt. This is a key difference to other salt crusts as usually it is discarded but in this case it is used to add texture and flavour to the steak.

== History ==
The earliest recipe found for salt-baked is from the fourth century BCE in Archestratus' Life of Luxury. The recipe details for a whole, round white fish such as sea bass, snapper or sea bream that was cleaned and then gutted. The fish is seasoned with thyme being inserted into the cavity of the fish prior to the salt crust encapsulating it in two pounds of salt glued together with water and egg whites.

In a Muslim cookbook originating from the thirteenth century, a layer of salt is placed on a new terracotta tile as a base and the fish is placed on top and another layer of salt is added on, then finally being placed in an oven.

The first recorded reference in China resembling the technique of baking in a salt crust is salt-baked chicken from Dong Jing in the province of Guangdong during the Qing Dynasty (1644–1911). The chicken was cooked and preserved in the salt fields of the area giving them added flavour. A more recent traditionally recipe is building a cocoon of salt around the chicken protecting it from direct heat ensuring even cooking and the possibility of drying out the meat. The chicken is wrapped in a tight parcel concentrating all the natural flavours of the chicken resulting in a succulent and tender product. This can be seen as the combination of the salt crust method with the French en papillote style.

== Around the world ==
- The salt-crusted fish has appeared in many different countries such as France, Italy, Spain and China.
- In southern Italy, fish native to the region such as bass, bream trout or snapper is traditionally baked in salt crust, using a combination of coarse salt for the base and fine salt for the top layer.
- In Thailand, salt crusted fish is cooked, stuffed with lemongrass.
- In Turkey, chicken baked in salt crust is a traditional dish from the province of Hatay, with records dating back to the Ottoman period. It is believed that the technique may have been adopted from China.
- In Colombia, beef tenderloin is baked in a salt crust, then wrapped in a kitchen towel and baked on a top of hot coals.

== Bibliography ==
- Ahrné, Lilia; Andersson, Claes-Göran; Floberg, Per; Rosén, Johan; Lingnert, Hans (December 2007). "Effect of crust temperature and water content on acrylamide formation during baking of white bread: Steam and falling temperature baking". LWT - Food Science and Technology. 40 (10): 1708–1715. doi:10.1016/j.lwt.2007.01.010.
- Martin James (2007) "Salt-crusted Sea Bass with runner bean salad"
- Dimbleby H., and Baxter J. (2015) "A Sicilian feast with salt-crusted seabass". The Guardian.

== See also ==
- acrylamide – Organic chemical compound
