= Mount Harris =

Mountain in Alaska and British Columbia

- Boundary Peak 156
- Location within Alaska Location within British Columbia

Highest point
- Elevation: 5,289 ft (1,612 m)
- Coordinates: 59°15′45″N 136°29′16″W

Geography
- Location: Stikine Region, British Columbia; Glacier Bay National Park and Preserve, Alaska
- Topo map: NTS 114P8 Mount Henry Clay

Mount Harris, also named Boundary Peak 156, is a mountain in Alaska and British Columbia, located on the Canada–United States border in the Takhinsha Mountains. In 1923 Boundary Peak 156 was named Mount Harris in honour of D. R. Harris, a surveyor in the Canadian section of the Boundary Survey.

== See also ==
- List of Boundary Peaks of the Alaska-British Columbia/Yukon border
