= Wilgena Station =

Pastoral lease in South Australia

Coordinates: 30.76975°S 134.74503°E

Location in South Australia

Wilgena Station, commonly known as simply Wilgena, is a pastoral lease that operates as a sheep station in outback South Australia.

It is situated about 180 kilometres (112 mi) north east of Ceduna and 197 kilometres (122 mi) south of Coober Pedy. The Trans-Australian Railway line passes through the property near the small town of Tarcoola. The soil is reasonably fertile, but rainfall is unpredictable, with an average of about 6 inches (152 mm) per year. Nonetheless, salt bush thrives on the Station, making good fodder for sheep.

Currently the station occupies an area of 4,742 square kilometres (1,831 sq mi) and is owned by A.J. and P.A. McBride Pty Ltd and raise merino sheep for their wool and meat. The property is managed by Ian Matheson. The McBride family purchased the property in 1923 and at one stage Wilgena was regarded as the largest totally fenced sheep run in the world. The property was split up during the 1980s into two properties; Wilgena and the 4,039 square kilometres (1,559 sq mi) North Well Station, which is run as a separate company enterprise.

The property is home to several rock holes that are able to trap water and were of great significance to the local Aboriginal peoples. Some of the larger ones are Adelbing which holds a volume of 22,727 litres (4,999 imp gal) and Coolbring which has a volume of 13,636 litres (3,000 imp gal).

== History ==
Main and Sells owned the property in 1882 when they placed it up for auction along with Yardea Station. Wilgena occupied an area of 943 square miles (2,442 km^{2}) at that time and was stocked with 400 head of mixed cattle. By 1884 the property encompassed an area of 1,150 square miles (2,978 km^{2}) and was stocked with 800 cattle, and was sinking wells that would provide for an estimated 40,000 sheep.

In 1909 the lessee was Simon Matheson, who by 1911 was looking to sell the property. In 1913, a half-interest of the station was sold to Henry Teesdale Smith for £5,000. 1n 1918, the entire property was sold to Joseph Timms for £14.000.

In 1922, Timms offered the property to the government for soldier settlement. At that time it consisted of over 2,000 square miles (5,180 km^{2}) and was at the far western end of the railway line from Adelaide. This did not eventuate, and instead the property was sold in 1923 to the McBrides, the present owners, who at that time owned other properties in the area such as Yardea. At that time the station was said to comprise 2,971 square miles (7,695 km^{2}). Wilgena had once been stocked with 70,000 sheep but had been used to graze cattle under Timms' management. The McBrides reverted to running sheep again.

In 1954 the station covered an area of 3,000 square miles (7,770 km^{2}) and carried a flock of about 45,000 sheep. The property had a plentiful supply of artesian water.

The land occupying the extent of the Wilgena Station pastoral lease was gazetted as a locality by the Government of South Australia on 26 April 2013 under the name 'Wilgena'.

== See also ==
- List of ranches and stations
- List of the largest stations in Australia
