= Petermann Ranges (Australia) =

Mountain range in central Australia

Coordinates: 25°00′S 129°46′E

The Petermann Ranges are a mountain range in central Australia. They run 320 km (200 mi) across the border between Western Australia and the southwest corner of the Northern Territory.

Their highest point is 1,158 metres (3,799 ft) above sea level. The range was formed about 550 million years ago during the Petermann Orogeny. The existing geological research has broadly determined that the Petermann Ranges were equivalent in height to the Himalayas.

The Petermanns were named for the geographer August Heinrich Petermann by Ernest Giles, the first European explorer to visit the area, and are commonly associated with the Yurliya ranges, nearby to the west. The area was included in the Katiti-Petermann Indigenous Protected Area in 2012.

== In popular culture ==
There are few geology-oriented documentaries that trace Uluru and Kata Tjuta's origins with the Australian Petermann Ranges. The Time Traveller's Guide To Australia (2012) produced by the ABC TV and Essential Media explores the geological origins of the continent.

== See also ==
- Musgrave Ranges
- Olia Chain
