= Kangaroo (disambiguation) =

A kangaroo is a large marsupial endemic to Australia.

(The) Kangaroo(s) may also refer to:

== Aircraft and aerospace ==
- Blackburn Kangaroo, a British World War I heavy bomber
- The Kangaroo, a Cessna Model AW with a Warner-Scarab engine owned by Eddie August Henry Schneider
- Kangaroo Route, a term for commercial flights between Europe and Australasia via the Eastern Hemisphere
- PWN-9 Kangaroo, a 1969 American sounding rocket project
- Sol Kangaroo, a Brazilian paraglider design
- Vulcanair Canguro, Italian civil utility aircraft in the 1980s

== Arts and entertainment ==
=== Film ===
- Kangaroo (1952 film), an American film directed by Lewis Milestone
- Kangaroo (1986 film), an Australian film based on the 1923 D.H. Lawrence novel Kangaroo
- Kangaroo (2007 film), an Indian Malayalam film directed by Raj Babu starring Prithviraj Sukumaran
- Kangaroo (2015 film), an Indian Tamil-language film
- Kangaroo (2017 film), an Australian film directed by Mike McIntyre and Kate McIntyre Clere
- Kangaroo (2025 film), an Australian film
- The Kangaroo Kid (film), a 1950 Australian-American western film directed by Lesley Selander

=== Music ===
- Kangaroo?, a 1981 album by Red Krayola and Art & Language
- The Kangaroo (song), a 1953 instrumental written and recorded by Les Paul and released as a single
- "Kangaroo" (or "Kanga Roo"), a song by Big Star from the album Third/Sister Lovers, notably covered by This Mortal Coil and Jeff Buckley
- "Kangaroo", a single by Arab on Radar
- "Kangaroo", a single by Julian Jordan and Sander van Doorn
- Kangaroo, a precursor to the American band Holy Moses

=== Other arts and entertainment ===
- Kangaroo (character), an enemy of Spider-Man in comics
- Kangaroo (novel), a novel by D. H. Lawrence
- Kangaroo (video game), a 1982 video game based on the marsupial
- Kangaroo (video on demand), a proposed video on demand platform

== Geography ==
=== Generally ===
- Kangaroo Island (disambiguation)
- Kangaroo Point (disambiguation)
- Kangaroo River (disambiguation)

=== Australia ===
- East Kangaroo Island, an island in Tasmania
- Kangaroo Island, an island in South Australia
  - Kangaroo Head, a headland
  - Kangaroo Head, South Australia, a locality

=== Elsewhere ===
- Kangaroo Lake (California), a lake in California, United States
- Kangaroo Lake (Wisconsin), a lake in Wisconsin, United States
- Kangaru, Iran, a village
- Kangaru, Kenya, a village

== Military vehicles ==
- Kangaroo (armoured personnel carrier), an expedient conversion of a tank into an armoured personnel carrier during World War II by British Commonwealth forces
- Raduga Kh-20 (NATO designation AS-3 Kangaroo), a cruise missile armed with a nuclear warhead which was developed by the Soviet Union during the Cold War

== Ships ==
- HMAS Kangaroo, a Royal Australian Navy boom defence vessel in commission from 1940 to 1955
- HMS Kangaroo, the name of several British Royal Navy ships
- USCGC Kangaroo (1917), a United States Coast Guard patrol boat, renamed USCGC AB-6 in 1923, in commission from 1919 to 1932
- USS Kangaroo, the name of more than one United States Navy ship
- Norah Moller, a vessel operated 1915–1938 as Kangaroo, primarily along the North West Australia coast
- Yara (ship), named Kangaroo II 1962–1973, a cargo and passenger ship that operated along the North West Australia coast

== Sports ==
- Fabulous Kangaroos, an Australian professional wrestling team
- Kangaroo Hoppet, an Australian cross-country skiing race
- Kangaroos, the nickname of the Australia national rugby league team
- Kangaroos, the nickname of the North Melbourne Football Club of the Australian Football League
- KangaRoos, an American brand of athletic shoe
- Royal Kangaroos, a professional wrestling tag team
- UMKC Kangaroos, the athletics team of University of Missouri–Kansas City

== Other uses ==
- Gold kangaroo, a term for the Australian gold bullion coin minted by the Perth Mint
- Harold "the Kangaroo" Thornton (1915-2005), Australian artist
- Kangaroo, a procedure of the Parliament of the United Kingdom
- Kangaroo (bus ticketing scheme), a bus ticketing scheme operated in Nottingham, UK
- Kangaroo care, a way of holding a prematurely-born infant with skin-to-skin contact
- Kangaroo court, a sham legal proceeding
- Kangaroo Defence, a chess opening also known as the Keres Defence
- Kangaroo Express, a chain of convenience stores in the US
- Kangaroo meat, the meat of any of the species of kangaroo
- Kangaroo rat, a small rodent in western United States
- Kangaroo unicycle, a type of unicycle that has both the cranks facing in the same direction
- Kangourou wagon, a specialized railroad car
- Kangaroo word, a word that contains letters of another word, in order, with the same meaning
- Mathematical Kangaroo, or International Mathematical Kangaroo, an annual international children's mathematics competition

== See also ==
- Christine Kangaloo
