= Koolama =

Koolama may refer to:

- Koolama Bay, formerly Rulhieres Bay, where the ship MV Koolhama was sunk
- MV Koolama, an Australian merchant vessel launched in 1937 and sank by Japanese aircraft in 1942
- Eastern Peace, Australian ship originally named Koolama II

== See also ==
- Coolamon (disambiguation)
