= 1932 Kimberley rescue =

Aviation incident in northern Australia

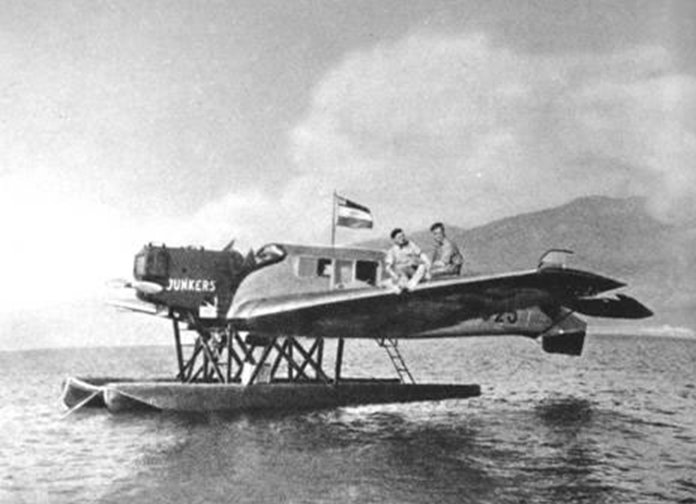
- Atlantis refuelling in Koepang

Occurrence
- Date: 15 May 1932– 6 July 1932
- Site: Cape St Lambert; 14°20′1.2″S 127°46′45.4″E

Aircraft
- Aircraft type: Junkers W 33
- Aircraft name: Atlantis
- Registration: D-1925
- Flight origin: Cologne, Germany
- Stopover: Germany; Italy; Greece; Turkey; Syria; Iraq; Persia; India; Ceylon; Burma; Thailand; Malaya; Singapore; Dutch East Indies; Dutch Timor
- Last stopover: Koepang, Dutch Timor
- Destination: Darwin, Australia
- Crew: 2
- Fatalities: 0
- Survivors: 2

Routes across the Timor Sea

Landing and rescue areas. 1. Initial landing zone near Berkeley River mouth on 15 May 1932; 2. Second landing area; ... 9, Rescued

In 1932, pilot Hans Bertram and mechanic Adolph Klausmann were rescued while attempting to circumnavigate the world in a Junkers W 33 seaplane. After departing Koepang, Dutch Timor, they endured a storm in the Timor Sea on 15 May and were forced to land in a remote coastal area of the Kimberley region in northern Western Australia. The stranded men spent almost six weeks severely deprived of food and water and were close to death when they were rescued by a group of local Aboriginal fishermen on 22 June.

== Circumnavigation attempt ==
On 29 February 1932 four aviators flew out of Cologne, Germany on a round-the-world flight attempt. The group comprised pilot Hans Bertram, co-pilot Thom, mechanic Adolph Klausmann and cameraman Alexander von Lagorio, and was intended to find potential markets for Germany's aviation industry as well as a goodwill tour visiting German communities along the route. The plane was a Junkers W 33 seaplane (float configuration), registration D-1925, named Atlantis.

Over ten weeks, the group successfully flew through Italy, Greece, Turkey, Iraq, India, Ceylon, Burma, Thailand, Malaya, Dutch East Indies and Dutch Timor. After arriving in Jakarta, it was agreed that Bertram and Klausmann would continue flying down the Indonesian archipelago and on to Australia, while Thom and von Lagorio would travel separately and the four would rendezvous in Shanghai, China.

Their engine was overhauled in the Dutch naval aerodrome in Soerabaja (now Surabaya), Dutch East Indies and the pair departed from there on 13 May, stopping for fuel at a bay near Koepang (now Kupang) in the western part of Dutch Timor the following day. At midnight on 14 May Bertram and Klausmann left Koepang for Darwin, expecting the 450 nautical miles (830 km; 520 mi) trip to take about 5 or 6 hours. They flew over the Timor Sea and had intended to land at dawn the next day but they encountered a severe storm and, low on fuel, were forced to land their seaplane in the first sheltered bay they found.

They had put down on the Kimberley coast, hundreds of kilometres west of the intended destination; while they guessed that they had landed somewhere on Melville Island, north of Darwin, they were actually at Cape St Lambert (14°20′1.2″S 127°46′45.4″E), just north of the mouth of the Berkeley River on the western coastline of the Joseph Bonaparte Gulf and about 370 kilometres (230 mi) south-west of Melville Island.

Stopovers	Country	Date	Comment
Cologne	Germany		
Friedrichshafen	Germany		
Lugano	Switzerland		
Porto Fossone	Italy	29 February 1932	
Venice	Italy	5 March 1932	
Brindisi	Italy		
Athens	Greece	11 March 1932	
Castellorisso	Greece		
Alexandretta	Turkey		
Deir-ez Zor	Syria	18 March 1932	
Baghdad	Iraq		
El Khidr	Iraq		
Basra	Iraq	23 March 1932	
Bushire	Iran	24 March 1932	
Gwadar	India		
Karachi	India	26 March 1932	
Bombay	India	29 March 1932	
Mangalorre	India	31 March 1932	
Cochin	India		
Colombo	Ceylon	2 April 1932	
Negombo	India		
Pondicheri	India		
Madras	India	8 April 1932	
Cocanada	India		
Calcutta	India	10 April 1932	
Akyab	Burma	15 April 1932	
Rangoon	Burma	16 April 1932	
Bangkok	Siam	22 April 1932	
Victoria Point	Malaya		
Penang	Malaya	24 April 1932	
Singapore04/28/32	Singapore		
Palembang	Dutch East Indies	1 May 1932	
Batavia	Dutch East Indies	2 May 1932	
Soerabaja	Dutch East Indies	7 May 1932	
Bima	Dutch East Indies	12 May 1932	
Koepang	Dutch Timor		
NW Australia coast	Australia		

== Lost ==
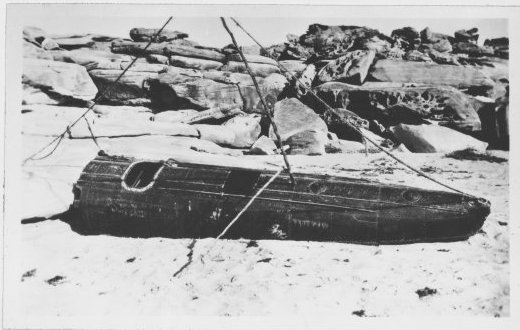
The makeshift canoe

Extremely isolated and surrounded by harsh bush, on the first night they were visited by an Aboriginal man but were unable to communicate successfully and he left them. The aviators, with only 15 litres (3.3 imp gal; 4.0 US gal) of fuel left, decided to attempt a take off and head west in what they thought was the direction of Darwin. They managed to get airborne but were forced to land again in another bay about 35 kilometres (22 mi) away, their engine cutting out as the plane ran out of fuel and rolled up a small beach.

Being unable to find water, they could only think that the Aboriginal man they had met in the other bay might be able to provide help, so they secured the plane and set out to walk back to the previous bay. They were plagued by heat, thirst and hunger and were overwhelmed by swarms of flies. After attempting to swim across an inlet they were chased by a crocodile and lost their clothes. Barefoot and naked they abandoned the search and resolved to return to the plane. After seven days of walking a more inland route, and without water, clothes or footwear, and ravaged by mosquitoes and completely exhausted they arrived back at the seaplane.

Now thirteen days into the ordeal, the pair drained the radiator of the remaining water and removed one of the seaplane floats to use as a makeshift kayak and started paddling in a westerly direction. The ship MV Koolinda passed by only 500 metres (1,640 ft) away but did not see them. They paddled for four days and nights and eventually came ashore north of Cape Bernier, east of King George River.

Still thinking that they were on Melville Island they decided to walk overland to find civilization, but when they discovered that they were not on an island they returned to the float. The float had been damaged, so to be able to paddle it again they had to cut off a section. The shortened float was not as seaworthy as previously used, so they only got a few kilometers before deciding it was too dangerous to continue and they returned to shore where they found shelter under a rock ledge at Cape Bernier. They remained there until being finally rescued.

== Search and rescue ==
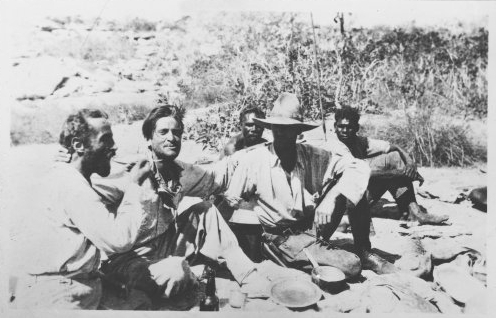
Klausmann, Bertram and rescuer Constable Gordon Marshall with the Aboriginal trackers who located the two men

The Dutch gunboat HNLMS Flores set out from Surabaya four days after the disappearance to search along the planned route across the Timor Sea. At the request of the German Consul-General, the Western Australian government also commenced a land, sea and air search of possible landing sites. A West Australian Airways de Havilland DH.50 mail plane was chartered for the purpose. Coastal ships from the State Shipping Service were also notified to be on the lookout.

On 13 June a foot search by native trackers found a cigarette case bearing the initials "HB" and a handkerchief which were handed to a missionary passing in a boat. The details of the location were vague however and a malfunctioning telegraph delayed the information getting to the correct authorities; when it eventually did the land search was resumed with increased vigour. Sixty people were directly involved in the search which by now had received widespread publicity.

The seaplane was located by a search aircraft on a beach near Rocky Island, 160 kilometres (99 mi) from Wyndham on 15 June but there was no sign of the men. Several days later, the Wyndham Meat Works launch Kimberley arrived at the site and found a note left by the airmen: "27 May 1932. Australia. Today we left the plane in float as a boat in a westerly direction. Bertram."

On 22 June, the men were found sheltering in a cave near Cape Bernier by a group of Aboriginal people. They were near death and had been lost for 39 days. A police overland party under Constable Marshall arrived a week later and they were taken to the hospital at Wyndham by boat, arriving there on 6 July. The ordeal had taken 53 days. Klausmann had become demented as a result of the tribulations and needed to be restrained.

== Later events ==
After convalescing in Wyndham, both men were taken to Perth— Bertram accepted an offer of a flight in West Australian Airways mailplane, departing from Wyndham on 13 July. The plane was greeted by a crowd of 6,000 at Maylands Aerodrome. In the evening, Bertram made a radio broadcast from the Australian Broadcasting Commission's offices of 6WF, which was the first public relay from Western Australia to the Eastern states.

In Perth, Bertram was befriended by and stayed with the founder of West Australian Airways, Norman Brearley. He returned to the site of the abandoned plane on 18 September with Fred Sexton, a WAA mechanic. They brought with them fuel and a replacement float from a de Havilland DH.50 which they managed to fit to the Junkers; they then flew the plane to Perth. They landed in Matilda Bay in the Swan River on 24 September 1932.

Klausmann followed in late July in the Koolinda as he was considered too unwell to fly. He returned to Germany by steamer but never fully recovered.

After removing the floats from the plane, Bertram flew around Australia for several months, visiting cities and towns and giving talks. His arrival at Kalgoorlie was marred when he crashed the plane at the airport causing extensive damage but no serious injury. Fred Sexton was flown to the town and assisted with repairs. Bertram returned to Berlin on 17 April 1933 where he received a hero's welcome.

Bertram wrote a book of the experience called Flug in die Hölle (Flight into Hell). He also had a successful career as a film director.

In 1985, a four-part television miniseries named Flight into Hell based on Hans Betram's book was made by the Australian Broadcasting Corporation. Gordon Flemyng was the director.

The makeshift canoe was recovered by staff from the Western Australian Museum in 1975.

== Tribute ==
The aviators' experiences and rescue by Aboriginal people (identified as Balanggarra) were referenced in a solo expedition by Australian adventurer Michael Atkinson in 2018. With permission of the Balanggarra landowners, he spent four weeks sailing and trekking the same area with no more supplies or survival equipment (apart from a satellite tracker for personal safety) than was available to the German aviators. His self-made film was published as a DVD, Surviving the Kimberley. His adventures were covered by Peter de Kruijff of The Kimberley Echo of 29 January 2018 and Australian Geographic magazine # 145.

== Bibliography ==
- Bertram, Hans (1977). Flug in die Hölle : Mein grosses Abenteuer (in German). Herbig, Munchen. ISBN 3776608269.
- Harrison-Ford, Carl; Hudson, Michael J; Bertram, Hans (1985). Flight into Hell. Currey O'Neil, Melbourne. ISBN 085902234X. (English translation and adaptation of Flug in die Hölle)
- Winter, Barbara (1979). Atlantis Is Missing : A Gripping True Story of Survival in the Australian Wilderness. Angus & Robertson. ISBN 0207142335.
- Winter, Barbara (1985). Atlantis, A Flight into Hell : the true story of Australia's most bizarre air rescue. Angus & Robertson. ISBN 0207152039. (republication of Atlantis Is Missing)
