= Conigrave (surname) =

Conigrave is an English-language surname. Notable people with this name include:

- Charles Price Conigrave (1882–1961), West Australian zoologist
- J. Fairfax Conigrave (1843–1920), Australian businessman
- Timothy Conigrave (1959–1994), Australian actor and author of Holding the Man
