= Bambra (ship) =

History
- Builder: AKT GES Weser
- Completed: August 1903
- Identification: Official number 139033
- Fate: Scrapped

General characteristics
- Tonnage: 3,302 GRT, 2,578 DWT
- Propulsion: Triple expansion engine
- Speed: 14 knots

Bambra was a ship by AKT GES Weser for Norddeutscher Lloyd in 1903 and subsequently operated by a number of other operators.

== History ==
The ship was completed in August 1903 by AKT GES Weser, Bremen for Norddeutscher Lloyd as the Prinz Sigismund for use on the Singapore to Australia service.

Upon the outbreak of World War I, it was seized on 4 August 1914 by the Government of Australia in Brisbane at the request of the Government of the United Kingdom. After court action over the ownership of its cargo, it was briefly operated by the Royal Australian Navy renamed the N2. It proved unsatisfactory and was laid up before being chartered to Stateships as a replacement for the Western Australia. It arrived in Fremantle in June 1915, being renamed Bambra in June 1916.

It proved to be too large and deep for ports on the North West Australia service, often running aground and colliding with jetties. Having been replaced by the Koolinda, it was transferred to the Board of Trade, leaving for Harwich in February 1927 and scrapped in 1928.
