= Tidmarsh (surname) =

Tidmarsh is an English surname. People with this surname include:

- Christopher Tidmarsh, stage name Neil Christian, (1943–2010), English pop singer
- David Tidmarsh (1892–1944), Irish-born flying ace of the Royal Flying Corps during the First World War
- Jay Tidmarsh Sir James Napier Tidmarsh (born 1932), Lord Lieutenant of Bristol from 1996 to 2007
- John Tidmarsh (1928–2019), British broadcaster and journalist with the BBC World Service
- John Francis Tidmarsh (1824–1906), Irish-born soap and candle manufacturer of South Australia

- J. Tidmarsh & Co, his company later owned by W. H. Burford

- Vivian Tidmarsh, playwright, author of Is Your Honeymoon Really Necessary?
