= Asia Express (disambiguation) =

Asia Express may refer to:

- Asia Express, former train service in China
- Asia Express (horse)
- Asia Express I, cargo ship
