= Dubai Gold =

History
- Namesake: Irene Greenwood
- Builder: VEB Mathias Thesen Werft Wismar
- Yard number: 124
- Completed: 1982
- Identification: IMO number: 7906954

General characteristics
- Tonnage: 13,482 GRT, 21,894 DWT
- Propulsion: MAN K8Z 70/120E
- Speed: 16 knots

Dubai Gold is a cargo ship. Built by VEB Mathias Thesen Werft Wismar and commissioned as the Stephan Reeckmann, it subsequently operated for other shipping lines under a variety of names.

== History ==
Built by VEB Mathias Thesen Werft Wismar in East Germany as the Stephan Reeckmann, it was bareboat chartered by Stateships to replace the Kimberley. It was the largest ship ever operated by Stateships. After being modified at Hongkong United Dockyards, in December 1983 it was renamed Irene Greenwood arriving in Fremantle in February 1984. It operated between Fremantle, Burnie, Hobart and Melbourne.

In 1988, it was purchased by Stateships, before being sold in July 1989 to Compania Financiera y Annadora, Argentina as the Marbonita. It was sold in 1995 to Nordic Maritime, Liberia as the Thorswave, in 1996 to Panama Shipping Company, Cyprus as the Stella K, who renamed it Stelian K in 1997 then CMBT Espirit in 1998, Tasman Pioneer in 2000, Stelina K in 2001, CMA CGM Tigris in 2002 and Stelian K in 2002. It was sold in 2004 to Polaris Shipping, Cyprus as the Dubai Gold.
