= Irene Greenwood =

Australian feminist, pacifist activist, broadcaster and writer

Irene Adelaide Greenwood
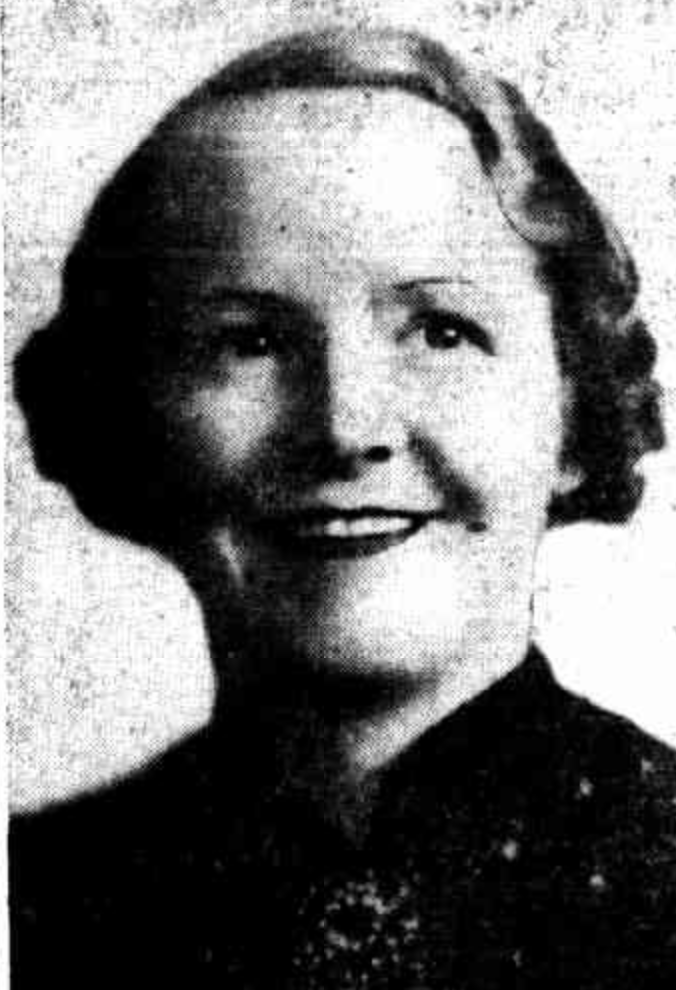
- Born: Irene Adelaide Driver; 9 December 1898; Albany, Western Australia
- Died: 14 April 1992 (aged 93); Claremont, Western Australia
- Known for: Feminist, peace activist, and broadcaster

Irene Greenwood AM (9 December 1898 — 14 April 1992) was an Australian radio broadcaster and feminist and peace activist.

== Early life and education ==
Greenwood was born in Albany, Western Australia on 9 December 1898. She was the oldest child of Henry Driver and Mary Ann Driver née Hicken. Greenwood attended Albany State School between 1905 and 1912 and Perth Modern School between 1913 and 1917. She then went on to study arts at the University of Western Australia.

== Later life and career ==
Driver worked as a secretary at the Department of Agriculture between 1918 and 1920 where she met her husband, Albert Ernest Greenwood, an accountant. They married on 18 June 1920 at the Anglican Church of the Annunciation in Broome, Western Australia.

Between 1931 and 1935, Greenwood worked as a broadcaster in Sydney before moving to Perth to run regular radio programmes, several of which centered around women. Greenwood retired from radio broadcasting in 1953.

Greenwood became involved in feminist and peace movements through her mother who was involved with the Woman’s Christian Temperance Union and the Australian Federation of Women Voters.

She took part in Perth's first strike by civil servants in 1920. While working as a broadcaster, many of her programs were centred around her political and feminist beliefs. Her involvement in feminist and peace movements increased after she retired from radio. During the 1960s and 1970s, she became a delegate to national conferences and forums and worked with the Women's International League for Peace and Freedom until she was in her seventies. She was also involved with the foundation of the Family Planning Association in Western Australia and the Abortion Law Repeal Association.

Before her death on 14 April 1992, Greenwood donated the majority of her radio transcripts, books, journals, personal correspondence and papers to the Murdoch University library.

== Awards and recognition ==
Greenwood received several awards through her work in feminist and peace movements. She was awarded with the United Nations Association of Australia Silver Peace Medal, Queen's Silver Jubilee Medal and in 1974 was appointed to the National Advisory Committee on Women's Affairs. She was also the first woman to receive an Honorary Degree from Murdoch University. In December 1983, Stateships named it largest ever ship the Irene Greenwood. In 1975 she was made a Member of the Order of Australia for her "service to women's welfare".

In 2005 a biography by Kaye Murray, Voice for Peace: The spirit of social activist Irene Greenwood (1898-1992), was published.

Greenwood Street, in the Canberra suburb of Denman Prospect, is named in her honour.

== See also ==
- List of peace activists
