= Acacia hypermeces =

Conservation status
- Priority One — Poorly Known Taxa (DEC)

Scientific classification
- Kingdom: Plantae
- Clade: Tracheophytes
- Clade: Angiosperms
- Clade: Eudicots
- Clade: Rosids
- Order: Fabales
- Family: Fabaceae
- Subfamily: Caesalpinioideae
- Clade: Mimosoid clade
- Genus: Acacia
- Species: A. hypermeces

Binomial name
- Acacia hypermeces A.S.George
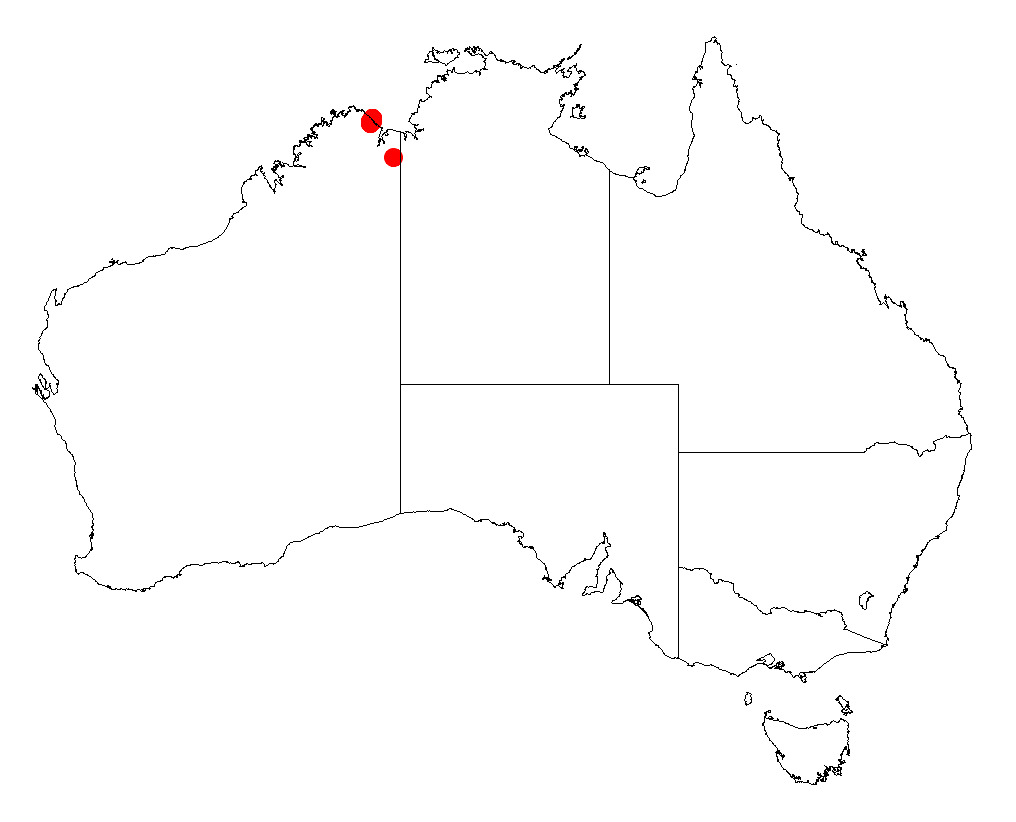
- Occurrence data from AVH

Synonyms
- Racosperma hypermeces (A.S.George) Pedley

Species of legume

Acacia hypermeces is a species of flowering plant in the family Fabaceae and is endemic to the far north of Western Australia. It is a sprawling, prostrate shrub with whorls of spreading to ascending, flattened phyllodes, heads of yellow flowers and glabrous pods on a long stalk.

== Description ==
Acacia hypermeces is a sprawling, prostrate shrub that typically spreads to about 1 m (3 ft 3 in), its branchlets, phyllodes and petal tips covered with bristly hairs. The phyllodes are arranged in spreading to ascending whorls of nine to twelve, usually 8–15 mm (0.31–0.59 in) long with a point on the end, one groove on the upper surface and two grooves below. There are spreading, tapering stipules about 1 mm (0.039 in) long at the base of the phyllodes. The flowers are borne in heads on a peduncle 10–26 mm (0.39–1.02 in) long, each head with 16 to 21 yellow flowers. Flowering has been recorded in January and June, and the pods are 30–40 mm (1.2–1.6 in), glabrous on a long stalk and contain about 6 seeds 3–4 mm (0.12–0.16 in) long with a boat-shaped aril.

== Taxonomy ==
Acacia hypermeces was first formally described in 1999 by Alex George in the Journal of the Royal Society of Western Australia from specimens collected by Kevin Francis Kenneally near the mouth of the Berkeley River in 1992. The specific epithet (hypermeces) means 'very long', referring to the stalk of the pods.

== Distribution and habitat ==
This species of wattle is only known from the type and nearby locations in the Central Kimberley, Northern Kimberley and Victoria Bonaparte bioregions of northern Western Australia.

== Conservation status ==
Acacia hypermeces is listed as "Priority One" by the Government of Western Australia Department of Biodiversity, Conservation and Attractions, meaning that it is known from only one or a few locations which are potentially at risk.

== See also ==
- List of Acacia species
