= Transontario =

Transontario may refer to the following ships:

- Yu Ying (ship), a cargo ship operated under the name by Poseidon Schiffahrt from 1966 until 1972.
- USNS Mission Soledad, a container ship operated under the name from 1967 until 1979.
