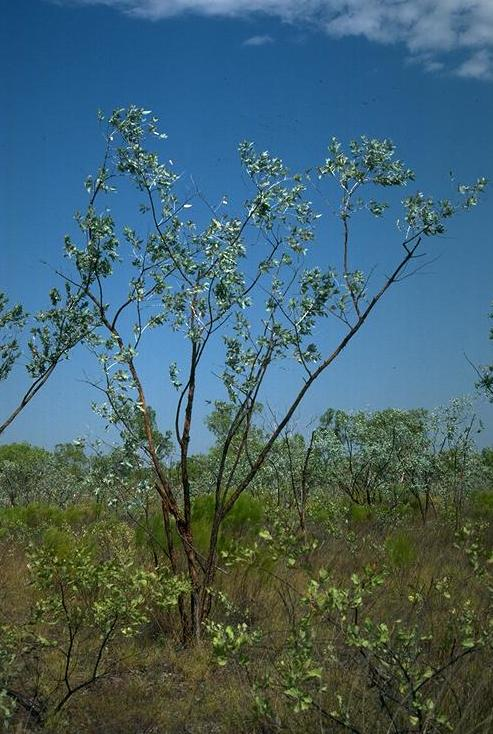

Conservation status
- Vulnerable (EPBC Act)

Scientific classification
- Kingdom: Plantae
- Clade: Tracheophytes
- Clade: Angiosperms
- Clade: Eudicots
- Clade: Rosids
- Order: Myrtales
- Family: Myrtaceae
- Genus: Eucalyptus
- Species: E. ceracea

Binomial name
- Eucalyptus ceracea Brooker & Done

= Eucalyptus ceracea =

Seppelt Range gum

Species of eucalyptus

Eucalyptus ceracea also known as the Seppelt Range gum or Seppelt Range yellow-jacket, is a species of small tree or mallee that is endemic to a small area in the north of Western Australia. It has thick, fibrous or flaky bark on the trunk and larger branches, dull, glaucous, egg-shaped leaves arranged in opposite pairs, flower buds in groups of seven or nine, bright orange flowers and urn-shaped fruit. The leaves, buds and fruit are covered with a white wax.

== Description ==
Eucalyptus ceracea is a small tree, often with many stems, or a mallee. It typically grows to a height of 3 to 6 metres (10 to 20 ft) and forms a lignotuber. The trunk and most of the branches are covered with thick, fibrous or flaky yellowish to reddish brown bark. Young plants, coppice regrowth and the crown of adult trees have egg-shaped, sessile leaves 60–100 mm (2.4–3.9 in) long and 30–55 mm (1.2–2.2 in) wide arranged in opposite pairs. The leaves are dull and glaucous and there are no adult leaves. The flower buds are arranged in groups of seven or nine on a peduncle 12–40 mm (0.47–1.57 in) long, the individual buds on a pedicel up to 5 mm (0.20 in) long. Mature buds are oval to pear-shaped, 15–17 mm (0.59–0.67 in) long and about 6 mm (0.24 in) wide with a rounded to conical operculum. Flowering has been recorded in June and the flowers are bright orange. The fruit is a woody, urn-shaped capsule 17–33 mm (0.67–1.30 in) long, 11–17 mm (0.43–0.67 in) wide and glaucous. The leaves, buds and fruits of the tree are covered with a white wax.

== Taxonomy and naming ==
Eucalyptus ceracea was first formally described in 1986 by Ian Brooker and Christopher Done from a specimen found south of the King George Falls in the Kimberley region. The description was published in the journal Nuytsia. The specific epithet (ceracea ) is derived from the Latin word cereus meaning "wax" or "waxy", referring to the waxy covering of the plant.

== Distribution and habitat ==
The Seppelt Range gum is found in skeletal sandy soils on scree slopes and sandstone ridges in a small area near the coast in the east Kimberley region of Western Australia. Associated species include spinifex (Plectrachne) and trees including Eucalyptus tectifica, E. tetrodonta and Erythrophleum chlorostachys. It is only known from two populations found in the Seppelt Range, north of Wyndham. Both populations are located on land vested in the Aboriginal Land Trust. The number of mature flowering plants is not known but the total area on which they area found is less than 50 square kilometres (19 sq mi).

== Conservation status ==
This eucalypt is listed as "vulnerable" under the Australian Government Environment Protection and Biodiversity Conservation Act 1999 and as "Threatened Flora (Declared Rare Flora — Extant)" by the Department of Environment and Conservation (Western Australia). The main threats to the species are mining, inappropriate fire regimes and its limited distribution.

== See also ==
- List of Eucalyptus species
