= Island Express =

Island Express may refer to:

- Island Express Air, a former Canadian airline
- Island Express (train), on Indian Railways
- Serenity 09, cargo ship formerly named Island Express
