= Venus B =

History
- Namesake: Roberta Jull
- Builder: Australian Shipping Industries
- Yard number: 291
- In service: 7 September 1990
- Identification: IMO number: 8820925

General characteristics
- Tonnage: 1,571 GRT, 3,454 DWT
- Propulsion: MAN B&W Alpha 6S26MC
- Speed: 13 knots

Venus B is a cargo ship. Built by Australian Shipping Industries for Stateships, it has subsequently operated for other shipping lines under a variety of names. As at April 2026 it remains operational.

== History ==
Built as the Roberta Jull by Australian Shipping Industries in Henderson, Western Australia, for Stateships, the ship entered service in September 1990. It was named after Roberta Jull.

In 1995 it was sold along with sister ships Frank Konecny and Gordon Reid by owner Westpac to Briese Schiff, Germany and renamed Bremer Merkur. In 1997 it was sold to Romamka Maritime, Cyprus and renamed Ultra Merkur.

It was renamed Agadir in 2001, Sirena in 2004, Sirena II in 2005 and Iran Shalamcheh by Valfajre Eight Shipping Company, Iran in 2005. As at April 2026 it remains operational as the Venus B.
