= Nirint Progress =

History
- Builder: Burmeister & Wain
- Completed: June 1978
- Identification: IMO number: 7707956
- Fate: Scrapped

General characteristics
- Tonnage: 10,015 GRT, 12,424 DWT
- Propulsion: Burmeister & Wain Alpha 12U28LU
- Speed: 16 knots

Nirint Progress was a roll-on/roll-off cargo ship. Built by Burmeister & Wain and commissioned as the Koolinda II by Stateships. It subsequently operated for other shipping lines under a variety of names.

== History ==
Built by Burmeister & Wain in Copenhagen for KS Difko as the Hamlet Saudia, it was bareboat chartered by Stateships, and renamed Koolinda II.

It was returned to its owners December 1990 and renamed Alderamin, Hamlet Saudia in 1991, Santa Barbara III in 1991 and Hamlet Saudia in 1993. It was sold in 1996 to Major World Shipping, Panama and renamed Nirint Progress. In May 2003 it was beached at Chittagong and scrapped.
