= Yu Qing =

Cargo ship built in 1966

History
- Builder: Mitsui E&S, Tamano, Japan
- Yard number: 741
- Completed: 1966
- Identification: Official number 355137; IMO number: 6610153

General characteristics
- Tonnage: 6,103 GRT, 7,723 DWT
- Propulsion: Burmeister & Wain 6-62VT2BF140
- Speed: 17 knots

Yu Qing was a cargo ship built in 1966 that operated for German, Australian and Chinese owners.

== History ==
Built as the Transmichigan by Mitsui E&S in Tamano, Japan for Poseidon Schiffahrt of Hamburg, the ship entered service in 1966 operating between Germany and the Great Lakes.

In August 1972 it, along with sister ship Transontario, was purchased by Stateships and after being modified by Taikoo Dockyard, Hong Kong entered service as the Boogalla (Aboriginal for Banksia) in July 1973.

The Boogalla operated services along the coast of North West Australia from Fremantle to Darwin.

It was sold in October 1981 to China Ocean Shipping Company, Beijing as the Yu Qing for use as a training ship, later being transferred to the Dalian Ocean Shipping Company with the same name, It was still on the Lloyd's Register under same name in 2005.
