= J. Fairfax Conigrave =

Australian businesspeople (1843-1920)

- Born: 1843; Rundle Street, Adelaide
- Died: 20 June 1920 (aged 76–77)

John Fairfax Conigrave (c. 1843 – 20 June 1920), generally referred to as J. F. Conigrave or J. Fairfax Conigrave, was a businessman in South Australia.

Conigrave was born in Rundle Street, Adelaide, the son of a Benjamin Conigrave, a cabinetmaker and his wife Matilda, née Reeve. He was educated at John L. Young's Adelaide Educational Institution from 1853 to 1858, when he left school to join the reporting staff of the South Australian Register. Around 1880 he left to join with C. N. Collison (another AEI student) in the real-estate business as Conigrave & Collison. He was appointed secretary to the fledgling South Australian Chamber of Manufactures, with offices co-located in Santo Buildings, Waymouth Street, under financial arrangements criticised by Rowland Rees as over-generous.

He was secretary of the Committee charged with the organization of the 1887 Adelaide Jubilee International Exhibition. He also served as secretary to the Australian Widows' Fund Life Assurance Society. He left for Western Australia in 1896, and was secretary to the Perth Chamber of Commerce.

== Other interests ==
- He was prominent in committees of the YMCA, the Australian Natives' Association and the North Adelaide Literary Society.
- He was a lay reader at the Congregational Church, Brougham Place
- He was a keen amateur historian and often gave lectures on aspects of South Australian history
- He was a prominent member of the Royal Geographical Society of Australasia

== Family ==
He married Sarah Price of Hindmarsh Island; among their children were

- Effie Marian Conigrave (1870– ) married Eben Allen (a future MP) in 1895, lived in Perth
- Berkeley Fairfax Conigrave (1871–) member of Modern Pickwick Club, moved to London
- Mabel Conigrave (1873– )
- Ida May Conigrave (1875– )
- Charles Price Conigrave (1882–1961), lived in the Northern Territory
- Gladys Reeve Conigrave (1884–1920), died in Singapore

Their last home was "Lingerwood", 6 Richardson Street, West Perth.
