= Hugh Sweeny =

Hugh Charles Sweeny from Dalby, Queensland along with two other sailors were the first Australian POWs captured in World War II. They were captured during the initial outbreak of fighting in the East African Campaign.

On 9 August 1940, three volunteers from HMAS Hobart went ashore in response to an urgent request for artillery support for the hard-pressed garrison. Petty Officer Hugh Jones from Kalgoorlie, Western Australia, Able Seaman William James Hurren from Sydney, New South Wales, and Able Seaman Hugh Charles Sweeny from Dalby, Queensland were landed with a QF 3 pounder Hotchkiss saluting gun on an improvised mounting, a reinforced 44-gallon drum.

By early the next morning they were in position, manning the gun and dressed in military uniform on the main British defence line at Tug Argan Gap, some 60 kilometres south of Berbera. The fighting continued during the next five days but when the British evacuated between 15–19 August, the three Australian sailors were reported missing believed killed in action 15 August 1940. Instead, they had been captured by the Italians, the first members of an Australian unit taken prisoner of war (POW) during World War II.

The three POWs from HMAS Hobart were recovered from Adi Ugri in Eritrea on 29 April 1941 after Italian East Africa fell to the British.
