= HMAS Kybra =

Australian Navy ship, WW2

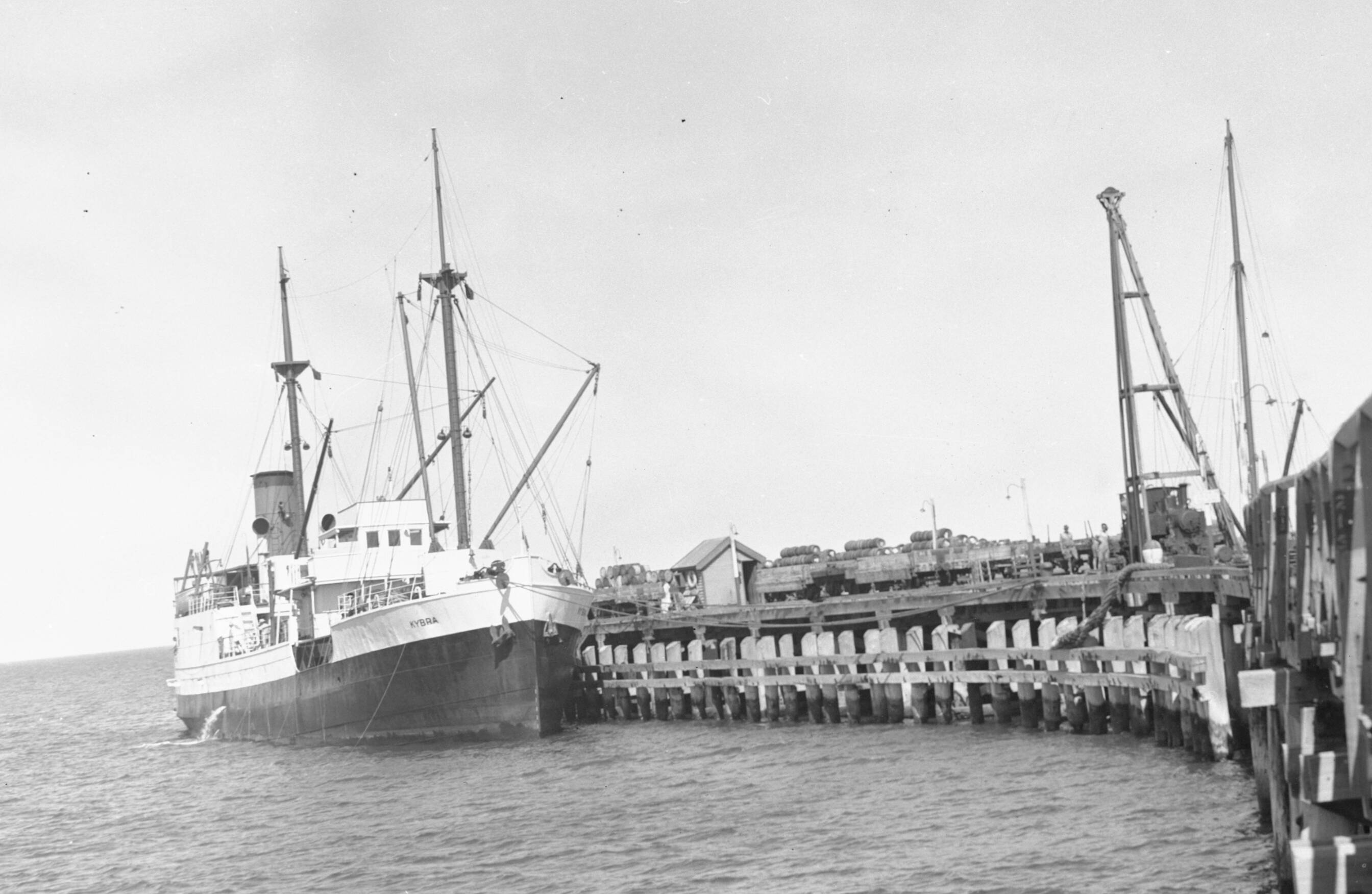
- MV Kybra alongside the One Mile Jetty in Carnarvon, Western Australia (c. 1930s).

History

Australia
- Name: Kybra
- Owner: Stateships
- Launched: 13 January 1926
- Fate: Scrapped 1968

General characteristics
- Length: 204 ft 2.5 in (62.243 m)
- Beam: 31 ft 1 in (9.47 m)
- Draught: 14 ft 8 in (4.47 m)
- Propulsion: 6-cylinder diesel engine
- Speed: 10.5 knots (19.4 km/h; 12.1 mph)

HMAS Kybra was a support and training ship from World War II, serving with the Royal Australian Navy from 1940 to 1945. The name means "little ship" in Noongar.

== History ==
Kybra was built in 1926 by Coaster Construction in Montrose, commissioned by Stateships of Western Australia. The vessel was 204 feet 2.5 inches (62.243 m) long, 31 feet 1 inch (9.47 m) wide, and had a draught of 14 feet 8 inches (4.47 m). The crew consisted of 20 sailors. She was powered by a six-cylinder diesel engine made by the Swiss company Sulzer Brothers in Winterthur and had a single propeller, giving a top speed of 10.5 knots (19.4 km/h; 12.1 mph). The gross register tonnage of the ship was 858 tons. She could take 34 passengers.

The vessel was launched on 13 January 1926, and sailed from Scotland to Australia where it arrived on 27 May. She was mainly used on the south coast of Western Australia.

In the 1930s the ship was required to be serviced in South Australia.

In 1940 the Royal Australian Navy commandeered the vessel as HMAS Kybra (FY90). She served as an auxiliary patrol and anti-submarine training ship out of Sydney.

After the war she was returned to the Stateships on 10 November 1945 and was used on routes in the north west of Western Australia in the 1950s.

Kybra was scrapped at Kalibaru, Indonesia, in April 1968.
