= Rice Trader =

History
- Builder: Caledon Shipbuilding & Engineering Company
- Yard number: 539
- Completed: November 1963
- Identification: Official number 303894

General characteristics
- Tonnage: 5,586 GRT, 7,300 DWT
- Propulsion: Sulzer 7RD68
- Speed: 17 knots

Rice Trader was a cargo ship. Built by the Caledon Shipbuilding & Engineering Company, Dundee for Cunard, it subsequently operated for Stateships and other shipping lines.

== History ==
Built as the Parthia by Caledon Shipbuilding & Engineering Company, Dundee for Cunard, the ship was delivered in October 1963. In June 1971 it was sold to Stateships and renamed Wambiri after being modified at the Taikoo Dockyard, Hong Kong.

In July 1979 it was sold to Sport Maritime, Monrovia. It was later resold to Greece and renamed Rice Trader. It was broken up at Alang, India in August 1984.
