= C. N. Collison =

Australian journalist and businessman (1845–1929)

Charles Nicholas Collison (1845 – 7 May 1929) was a journalist and businessman in the early days of South Australia.

== History ==
Charles Nicholas Collison (1845 – 7 May 1929) was born in London in 1845 and migrated to South Australia with his parents and siblings around 1849.

Charles Cleeve Collison (1820 – 7 November 1884) was born in London, married Martha Cox (1826 – 25 June 1919), and emigrated with his small family to South Australia in 1849 or 1850. He purchased a property which he named "Clapham", now part of the suburbs Clapham and Torrens Park. They moved to Hawthorn, Victoria around 1870. Their children included:
- Charles Nicholas Collison (1845 – 7 May 1929)
- Herbert William Collison (c. 1847 – 21 November 1878) married Rhoda Marion Chartier on 16 January 1872

- Clement Stanley Collison (1875–1927) married Ethel Tidmarsh in 1905. She married again, to cousin John Cleeve Collison in 1928. Ethel was a granddaughter of soap and candle manufacturer J. F. Tidmarsh.

- Clement Collison (1850 – 27 July 1938), whose name appears on C. N. Collison's headstone.

Rev. Francis William Cox (c. 1816 – 29 March 1904) of the Hindmarsh Square Congregational Church, was a brother-in-law.

He was educated at J. L. Young's Adelaide Educational Institution and apprenticed to J. T. Fitch (c. 1825–1902), father of a schoolmate, who had a draper's shop at the corner of Rundle and Pulteney streets. Around 1866 he joined the literary staff of South Australian Register, a position he held until 1876.

He spent a few years farming and store keeping at Stansbury on Yorke's Peninsula, then around 1880 joined with J. Fairfax Conigrave, another old school chum, and fellow member of the North Adelaide Young Men's Society as Conigrave & Collison, patent and real estate agents, with rooms in the newly erected Santo's Buildings on Waymouth Street. Collison handled the patent work, and both were involved with land development in the Adelaide Hills, particularly Belair and Aldgate, following the development in 1882 of passenger rail services that extended as far as Bridgewater. He was one of the promoters of the Hills Land and Investment Company, Ltd., and a foundation member of the District Council of Stirling.

The partnership was dissolved in April, 1889, and Collison concentrated on patent law, taking into partnership his son, A. G. Collison, who had served an apprenticeship in the locomotive workshop at Islington, then qualified as a patent agent. When the Federal patents legislation came into force, Mr. Collison removed to Melbourne, and there conducted the Australian and overseas business of the firm until within a few months of his death, while his son handled the Adelaide office. For many years Collison was an active member of the North Adelaide Congregational Church and the North Adelaide Young Men's Society. Both Collison and Conigrave were members of the Australian Natives' Association, once a large friendly society.

He served as Hon. Secretary of the Aborigines' Friends' Association from 1879 to 1890 succeeding C. J. Holder, and followed by W. E. Dalton.

He was buried in the Wesleyan cemetery, Walkerville.

== Family ==
On 24 October 1867 Collison married Emily Gore ( – 11 September 1891), second daughter of Alfred Gore. Their children include:

- Arthur Gore Collison (29 September 1868 – 1958) married Florence Adelaide Broadbent (1868 – 2 August 1946) on 22 March 1893
- Mary Collison (25 May 1870 – 1954), a student at the Advanced School for Girls
- Edith Collison (28 May 1874 – 1958), also an ASG student
- Hilda Collison (23 August 1876 – 1968)
- Ruth Collison (1 August 1878 – 1965) married Alfred John Gurr (1873–1938) on 20 September 1906
- John Cleeve Collison (30 August 1880 – ) married Rosalie Clare Bayly ( – 1927) on 29 November 1913 of Adelaide. He married again on 8 December 1928, to Ethel Collison, née Tidmarsh, widow of his cousin Clement Stanley Collison ( –1927).
- Roy Neill Collison (4 February 1882 – ) to Amie Hummerston ( – ) on 2 October 1920, lived in Melbourne
- Lieut. Herbert Youngman Collison (26 April 1884 – 23 February 1917) married Dorothy Elaine Adamson (18 June 1883 – 20 October 1961) on 21 July 1905. He was killed in the war.

They lived at McKinnon Parade, North Adelaide; then Mount Lofty. They returned to Stansbury in 1891 hoping the milder climate might be beneficial to his wife's ailing health. That was not to be, and she died shortly after arrival. He married again, to Muriel Bucham Mackie (1865 – 3 March 1905) on 25 July 1893

== Bibliography ==
- Charles Nicholas Collison Papers of Charles Nicholas Collison, comprising correspondence relating to the Premier Manufacturing Company, material relating to Collison's ancestors, deed of partnership and indenture. Pub. State Archives
