= Koolinda =

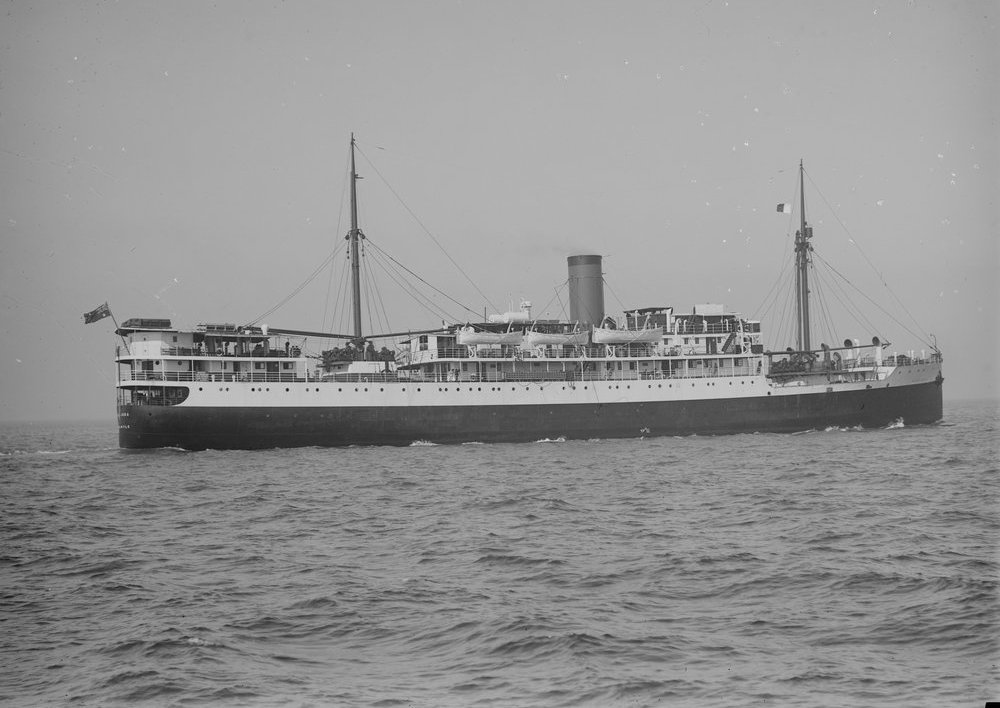
- MV Koolinda, c.1940

History

Australia
- Name: Koolinda
- Operator: State Shipping Service of Western Australia
- Builder: Harland & Wolff, Govan
- Yard number: 728
- Launched: 26 August 1926
- Fate: Arrived Hong Kong for scrapping, 5 December 1959

General characteristics
- Tonnage: 4,372 GRT; 2,070 DWT
- Length: 344 ft (105 m)
- Beam: 50 ft (15 m)
- Draught: 28 ft 6 in (8.69 m)
- Propulsion: 2 × 2,550 hp (1,902 kW) H&W 8-cylinder, 4-stroke diesel engines

MV Koolinda was an Australian general cargo and passenger ship which operated as a coastal steamer off Western Australia from 1930 to 1959.

== General description ==
Koolinda was built in 1926 by Harland and Wolff of Glasgow, Scotland for the State Shipping Service, and was registered at Fremantle. Her official tonnage was 4,372 gross register tons (12,380 m^{3}), she was 344 feet long, with a beam of 50 feet, and had diesel engines driving two propellers.

Koolinda was used mostly for passenger and general freight transport on coastal routes in Western Australian waters.

In May 1932, Koolinda famously narrowly missed seeing two German aviators lost on the Kimberley coastline. The men were eventually found close to death.

In the aftermath of the battle between HMAS Sydney and German auxiliary cruiser Kormoran in November 1941, the Koolinda recovered German sailors from a 31-man lifeboat and returned them to Carnarvon.

Koolinda is sometimes confused with another State Ships vessel of a similar design, MV Koolama.
