= Eucla (ship) =

History
- Namesake: Eucla
- Builder: S McKnight & Company
- Yard number: 64
- Launched: 18 October 1901
- Completed: 1901
- Out of service: 1926
- Identification: Official number: 115233
- Fate: Scuttled

General characteristics
- Tonnage: 564 GRT, 452 DWT
- Propulsion: Triple expansion engine

Eucla was a ship operated by Stateships in Western Australia.

== History ==
Eucla was built in 1901 as the Wexford by S McKnight & Company, Ayr, Scotland for J Bacon Limited of Liverpool for shallow water use with a special shoe fitted to protect its keel. It was used in the cattle and pig trade between ports in the United Kingdom.

In 1912 it was purchased by Stateships, Western Australia for use on its south coast service from Fremantle to Albany, Esperance and Eucla. It was renamed Eucla in Albany in August 1912. After being retired 1926 and laid up at Victoria Quay, Fremantle, scrapping commenced in 1931, with its hull scuttled off Rottnest Island in 1932.
