= HMAS Hobart (D63) =

1936-1962 modified Leander-class light cruiser of the Royal and Royal Australian Navies

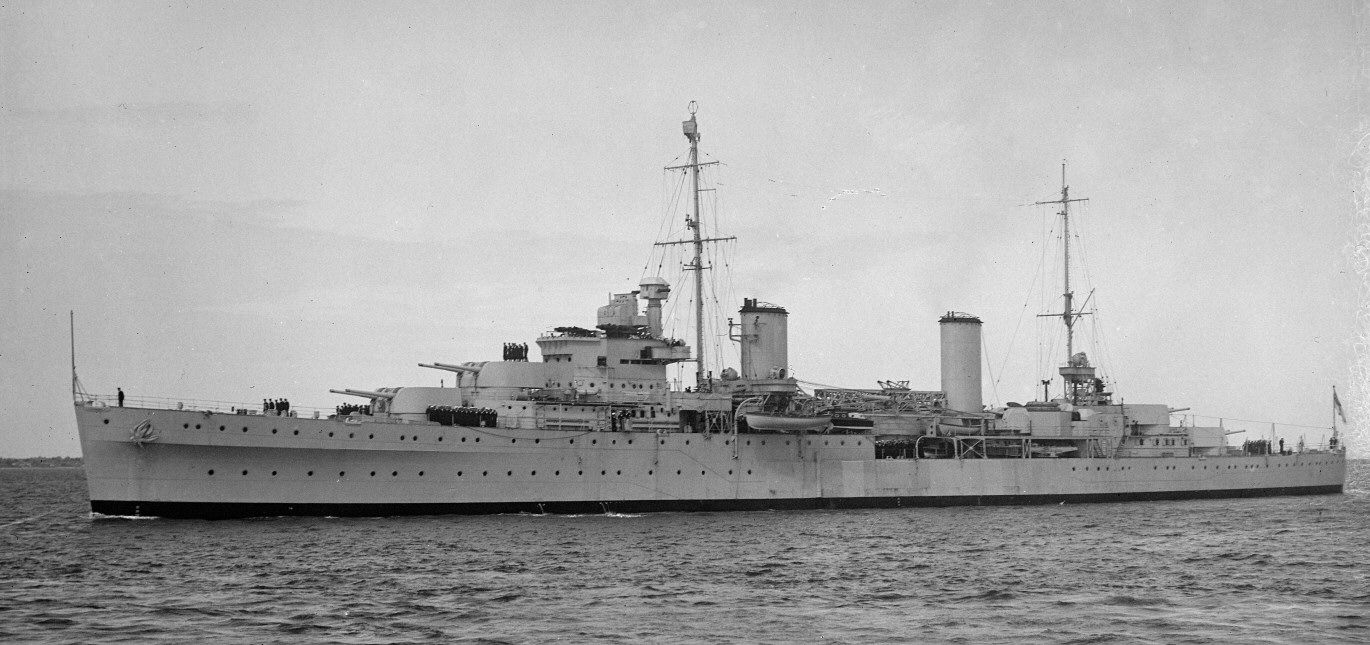
- HMAS Hobart

History

United Kingdom
- Name: Apollo
- Builder: HM Dockyard, Devonport
- Laid down: 15 August 1933
- Launched: 9 October 1934
- Commissioned: 13 January 1936
- Decommissioned: 1938
- Identification: Pennant number: D63
- Fate: Sold to Royal Australian Navy

Australia
- Name: Hobart
- Namesake: City of Hobart
- Commissioned: 28 September 1938
- Decommissioned: 20 December 1947
- Identification: Pennant number: D63
- Motto: Ubertas et Fidelitas; (Latin: "Richness and Faithfulness")
- Honours and awards: Battle honours: Mediterranean 1941; Indian Ocean 1941; Coral Sea 1942; Savo Island 1942; Guadalcanal 1942; Pacific 1942–45; East Indies 1940; Borneo 1945
- Fate: Sold for scrap in 1962

General characteristics (as completed)
- Class & type: Modified Leander-class light cruiser
- Displacement: 7,003 long tons (7,115 t) (standard)
- Length: 562 ft 4 in (171.4 m) (o/a); 530 ft (161.5 m) (p/p)
- Beam: 56 ft 8 in (17.3 m)
- Draught: 19 ft 5 in (5.9 m)
- Installed power: 4 × Admiralty 3-drum boilers; 72,000 shp (54,000 kW)
- Propulsion: 4 shafts; 4 × geared steam turbines
- Speed: 32.5 kn (60.2 km/h; 37.4 mph)
- Range: 7,000 nmi (13,000 km; 8,100 mi) at 16 knots (30 km/h; 18 mph)
- Complement: 646 (35 officers, 611 ratings) standard
- Armament: 4 × twin BL 6 in (152 mm) guns; 4 × single QF 4 in (102 mm) guns; 3 × quadruple 0.5 in (12.7 mm) AA machineguns; 2 × quadruple 21 in (533 mm) torpedo tubes
- Armour: Waterline belt: 3 in (76 mm); Magazine: 2–3.5 in (51–89 mm); Deck: 1 in (25 mm); Gun turrets: 1 in (25 mm)
- Aircraft carried: 1 Supermarine Walrus
- Aviation facilities: 1 catapult

HMAS Hobart was a modified Leander-class light cruiser which served in the Royal Australian Navy (RAN) during World War II. Originally constructed for the Royal Navy as HMS Apollo, the ship entered service in 1936, and was sold to Australia two years later. During the war, Hobart was involved in the evacuation of British Somaliland in 1940, fought at the Battle of the Coral Sea and supported the amphibious landings at Guadalcanal and Tulagi in 1942. She was torpedoed by a Japanese submarine in 1943, then returned to service in 1945 and supported the landings at Tarakan, Wewak, Brunei, and Balikpapan. Hobart was placed in reserve in 1947, but plans to modernise her and return her to service as an aircraft carrier escort, training ship, or guided missile ship were not followed through. The cruiser was sold for scrapping in 1962.

== Design and construction ==
The ship was one of three Modified Leander-class light cruisers constructed for the Royal Navy. The main difference to the previous five Leanders was that the newer ships had their machinery and propulsion equipment organised in two self-contained units (separated fore and aft), allowing the ship to continue operating if one set was damaged. The two exhaust funnels, one for each machinery space, gave the modified ships a different profile from the early Leanders, which had a single funnel. To cover the separate machinery spaces, the side armour was extended from 84 to 141 feet (26 to 43 m), negating the weight reduction created by the separation. During design, it was planned to modify the forward-most and aft-most 6-inch turrets to be fitted with three guns instead of two, but the plan was cancelled when it was determined that the required alterations would cause several negative side effects, including reducing the ship's top speed and causing problems with effective fire control.

The cruiser was laid down at HM Dockyard, Devonport, England on 15 August 1933 as HMS Apollo. She was launched on 9 October 1934 by Lady Florence, wife of Admiral Sir William Boyle. The ship was commissioned into the Royal Navy on 13 January 1936.

== Operational history ==
=== Royal Navy service ===
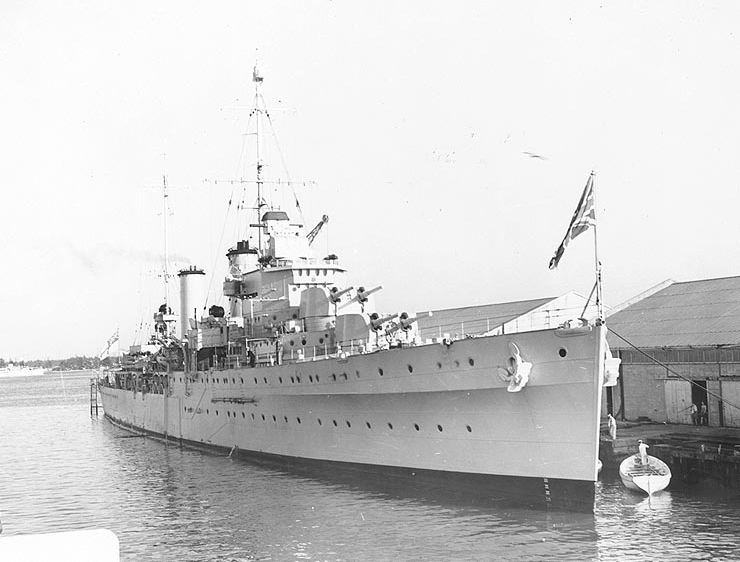
Apollo berthed in Miami, Florida in 1938

Apollo served on the North American and West Indies Station until 1938. On 15 November 1937, the ocean liner MV Reina del Pacifico, which operated between Liverpool and Valparaíso, Chile, via Bermuda, the West Indies and the Panama Canal, stopped at Bermuda on its way to Chile with the body of former Prime Minister Ramsay MacDonald who had died aboard on 9 November. MacDonald's body was transferred to the Royal Navy at Bermuda for return to Plymouth. All of the Bermuda-based cruisers of the America and West Indies Station were away from Bermuda at that time except for HMS Orion and HMS Apollo. As Apollo was undergoing a refit at the dockyard, it would have fallen to Orion to deliver MacDonald's body, but as she had been temporary flagship since HMS York had departed on 27 October for Trinidad (due to civil unrest there) she could not leave the station and Apollo was consequently hurried through her refit instead. Orion was tasked with the memorial service for MacDonald, whose body was taken aboard the Royal Navy tug Sandboy once the Reina del Pacifico was in Bermudian waters and landed on Front Street in the City of Hamilton along with the Royal Naval Dockyard Chaplain, the Orion's Chaplain, an Honour Guard, sentries and coffin bearers. MacDonald's coffin was borne on a gun carriage to the Church of England's Cathedral of the Most Holy Trinity, in a procession that included the ship's company of Orion and a detachment of the Sherwood Foresters (Nottinghamshire and Derbyshire Regiment), serving in the Bermuda Garrison and based at Prospect Camp Scotland. At the cathedral, Arthur Browne, the Bishop of Bermuda, conducted the memorial service, which was followed by a lying in state. Thousands visited to pay their respects. MacDonald's body and his daughter departed Bermuda the following day aboard Apollo, arriving at Plymouth on 25 November. His funeral was in Westminster Abbey on 26 November, followed by a private cremation service at Golders Green. After cremation, his ashes were taken to Lossiemouth, where a service commenced in his house, "The Hillocks" followed by a procession to Holy Trinity Church, Spynie where they were buried alongside his wife Margaret and their son David at in his native Morayshire.

=== Australian acquisition ===
The ship was purchased by the Australian Government in 1938, with the transfer of the seaplane tender HMAS Albatross to the Royal Navy as part of the payment. She was originally to be renamed and transferred to the RAN on 6 October, but the mobilisation of the British Home Fleet in response to the Munich Crisis brought this forward to 28 September. The cruiser arrived in Australia at the end of 1938, and visited her namesake city during February 1939.

=== World War II ===
At the start of World War II, Hobart was initially deployed on patrols of Bass Strait. A month later, on 13 October, the cruiser sailed for Singapore with several RAN destroyers. After arrival, she was assigned to patrol and convoy escort duties in the Bay of Bengal and the Arabian Sea. In February 1940, she escorted an Australian troop convoy from Colombo to the Middle East, then spent time in Ceylon as flagship of the Commander-in-Chief, East Indies, before being transferred to Aden with HMS Liverpool in April to form the core of the Royal Navy's Red Sea Force.

The cruiser fired in anger for the first time on 12 June 1940, in retaliation to Italian aircraft attacking Aden. On 19 June, the cruiser's Walrus amphibious aircraft dropped bombs on an Italian wireless station on Centre Peak Island in the Red Sea. At the start of August, Hobart escorted a relief force to Berbera, in response to the Italian invasion of British Somaliland. Two weeks later, the decision was made to abandon British Somaliland, and Hobart was designated headquarters for the evacuation. The Walrus was used to successfully fend off air raids and bomb the Italian headquarters at Zeila, while a 3-pounder Hotchkiss saluting gun was converted into an anti-tank gun and sent to assist in the rearguard action, although the three volunteers crewing the weapon were captured. Hobart's captain orchestrated the evacuation of over 7,000 soldiers and civilians aboard a heterogenous flotilla of vessels. The cruiser was the last ship to leave on 19 August, collecting stragglers in the ship's boats while demolition teams and the ship's guns destroyed anything of value.

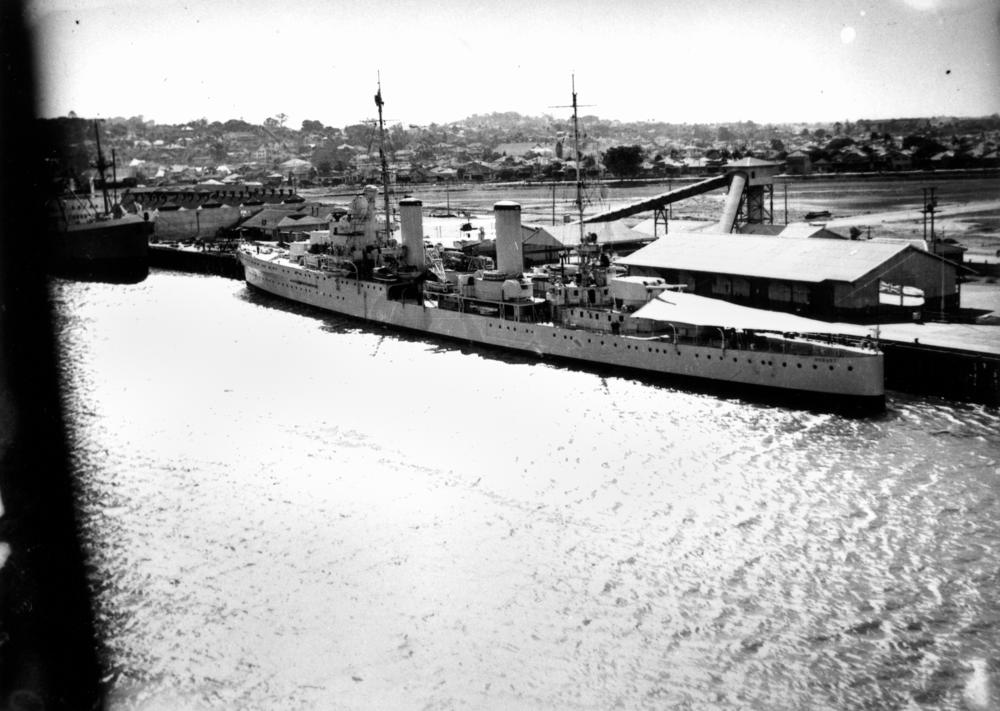
HMAS Hobart in Brisbane in 1939

Hobart remained in the Red Sea until October, when she sailed to Colombo for refit, then returned to Australia. Shortly after arrival, Rear Admiral John Gregory Crace transferred his flag from HMAS Canberra to Hobart. The cruiser was used as an escort in Australian waters until June 1941, when the ship's seaplane and catapult were removed, Crace transferred his flag back to Canberra, and Hobart was sent to the Mediterranean to relieve sister ship HMAS Perth. On 13 July, Hobart was in Port Tewfik when the area was bombed. The troopship Georgic was damaged by bombs and attempted to beach, but collided with the transport Gleneran and forced her ashore as well. Hobart's company helped to evacuate crew and passengers from the ships during the evening, and helped to refloat Georgic the next day. On joining the Mediterranean Fleet, Hobart was assigned to support Allied forces during the Western Desert campaign until December 1941, when the Japanese declaration of war required the ship to relocate to Australian waters.

The cruiser was diverted to escort a convoy from Colombo to Singapore; the ships arrived on 3 January, the same day as a Japanese air raid. Hobart reached Fremantle on 11 January, then escorted a convoy to Java before the month's end. On 3 February 1942, while sailing from Singapore to Batavia, Hobart and the destroyer HMS Tenedos came to the aid of the merchant ship Norah Moller, which had been bombed by three aircraft. The cruiser collected 57 of the 70 aboard, with the rest aboard Tenedos. From this point, the ship was almost constantly deployed on convoy escort duties with the Eastern Fleet. On 25 February, the cruiser was attacked by 27 bombers while refuelling from a tanker at Tanjung Priok. There was only minor damage, but the fuelling operation could not be completed, and Hobart was unable to join the Allied force that was defeated during the Battle of the Java Sea two days later.

At the start of May, the Americans learned of an imminent Japanese invasion of Port Moresby, and Hobart was sent with HMAS Australia to rendezvous with United States forces in the Coral Sea. At 07:00 on 7 May, Rear Admiral Crace, embarked aboard Australia as commander of Task Force 44, was ordered to take his ships (Australia, Hobart, US cruiser Chicago, and US destroyers Perkins, Walke, and Farragut) to the Jomard Passage, and engage any Japanese ships found en route to Port Moresby, while several US carrier groups engaged a Japanese force headed for the Solomon Islands. The ships reached their patrol area around 14:00, fired on a group of eleven unidentified aircraft at maximum range with no damage dealt at 14:27, and were attacked themselves by twelve Japanese twin-engine torpedo bombers at 15:06; no ships were damaged for the loss of five aircraft. At 15:16, nineteen Japanese heavy bombers dropped their payload on the Allied ships; no ships were hit directly, the only casualties (aboard Chicago) were from shrapnel. A few minutes later, the ships were attacked by another three heavy bombers, flying at a higher altitude to the first group; the bombing was much less accurate. It was later learned that the three aircraft belonged to the United States Army Air Forces (USAAF). Although USN Vice Admiral Herbert F. Leary made plans to train aircrews in naval vessel recognition in response, USAAF General George Brett refused to implement them or acknowledge that the friendly fire incident had happened. With no new orders, Crace decided to relocate his ships during the night to a point 220 nautical miles (410 km; 250 mi) from Port Moresby, to better intercept a Japanese invasion force if it came through either the Jomard Passage or the China Strait. Instructions from the American commander of the operation were still not forthcoming, and Crace was forced to rely on intercepted radio messages to track the progress of the main battle. The task force remained in their assigned area until 01:00 on 10 May, when Crace ordered them to withdraw south to Cid Harbour on Whitsunday Island; the lack of reports and intelligence concerning either the Americans or Japanese led him to conclude that both forces had withdrawn, and there was no immediate threat to Port Moresby.

On 7 August, Hobart supported the amphibious landings at Guadalcanal and Tulagi.

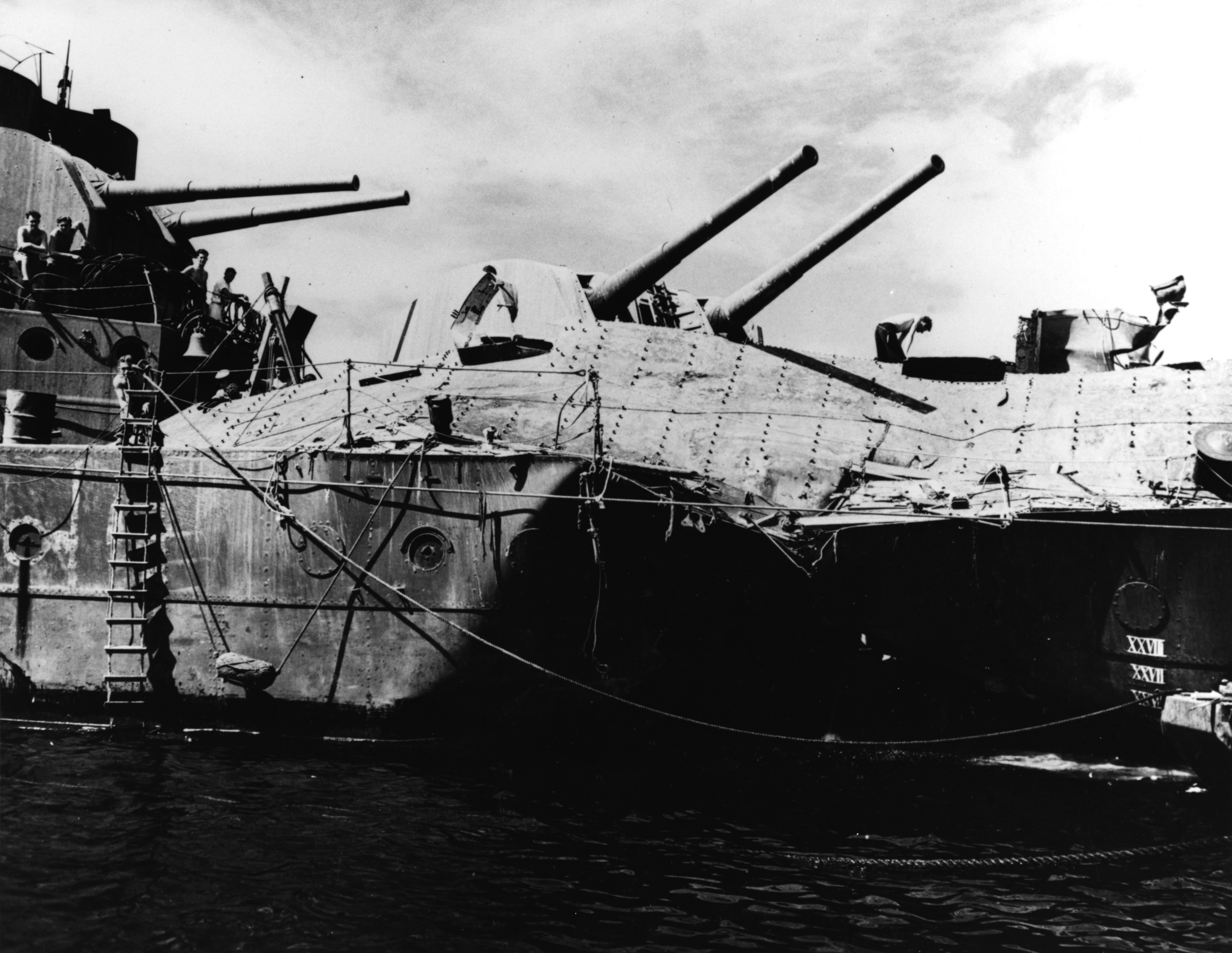
The damage from a torpedo attack against Hobart on 20 July 1943

On the evening of 20 July 1943, while sailing to Espiritu Santo as part of Task Force 74, Hobart was torpedoed by the Japanese submarine I-11. The torpedo struck the port quarter and caused serious damage. The damage included significant structural damage around the wardroom, and the loss of electricity supply and steering control. Seven officers and six sailors were killed, while another six officers and one sailor were injured. No submarine was detected prior to or after the attack, and post-attack reconstructions concluded that the unidentified submarine, positioned ahead of the eastward-sailing task force, saw the ships silhouetted against the sunset and fired a spread of torpedoes at Australia from at least 10 nautical miles (19 km; 12 mi); these missed the heavy cruiser, and the torpedo at one edge of the fan impacted against Hobart instead. After electrical power and steering were restored, the cruiser limped to Espiritu Santo under the escort of USS Nicholas and USS Radford for temporary repairs, which were performed by USS Vestal, then sailed for Australia on 21 August with the destroyers Arunta and Warramunga escorting. The cruiser arrived in Sydney on 26 August, and was docked at Cockatoo Island Dockyard for repairs and refurbishment; the quantity of damage meant that she was out of service until 1945.

Following her return, Hobart was involved in the landing at Tarakan on 25 April 1945, at Wewak on 11 May, at Brunei in June, and at Balikpapan in July. Hobart entered Tokyo Bay on 31 August, and was present for Victory over Japan Day (2 September 1945), when the Japanese Instrument of Surrender was signed. Following the war, Hobart spent 1946 and 1947 in Japanese waters.

Hobart received eight battle honours for her wartime service: "Mediterranean 1941", "Indian Ocean 1941", "Coral Sea 1942", "Savo Island 1942", "Guadalcanal 1942", "Pacific 1942–45", "East Indies 1940", and "Borneo 1945".

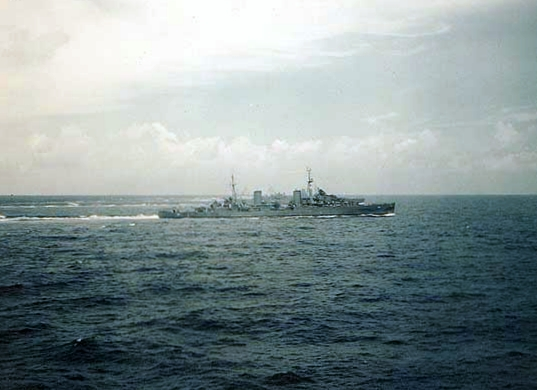
Hobart exercising with Shropshire off Subic Bay in August 1945

== Decommissioning and fate ==
Hobart was paid off into the reserve fleet on 20 December 1947. In 1950, following the failure to find a suitable new British cruiser design, and a dollar shortage preventing the purchase of US vessels, it was decided to modernise Hobart and use her as a stop-gap aircraft carrier escort until the Daring-class destroyers entered service, after which she would serve as a troop convoy escort to the Middle East in the event of a future conflict. This planned role changed in 1952 following a series of financial cutbacks and the realisation that the Battle-class destroyers were suitable carrier escorts; instead, Hobart was to replace Australia as the training cruiser. She was taken to the State Dockyard, Newcastle for modification.

During 1953 and 1954, further reductions in the RAN saw one carrier taken off active duty for use as a training vessel, eliminating the need to return Hobart to service. Other options for reactivating the cruiser were explored, including conversion to a guided missile ship, but by April 1955, all proposals were abandoned. Despite the conversion work to date having cost £A1 million, the modification was cancelled, and Hobart was returned to the reserve fleet and marked for disposal. Hobart was sold for scrap on 22 February 1962 to Japanese firm Mitsui & Co (Aust) Pty Ltd. The ship left Sydney under tow on 3 March, and arrived in Osaka on 2 April for breaking up.
