= USS Kangaroo =

USS Kangaroo has been the name of more than one United States Navy ship, and may refer to:

- USS Kangaroo (SP-1284), a patrol boat in commission from 1917 to 1919
- USS Kangaroo (IX-121), a tanker in commission from 1943 to 1946

== See also ==
- Kangaroo (disambiguation)
