= Flight into Hell =

- Based on: Flight into Hell by Hans Bertram
- Written by: Peter Yeldham
- Directed by: Gordon Flemyng
- Starring: Helmut Zierl; Werner Stocker; Paul Keane; Anne Tenney
- Countries of origin: Australia; West Germany
- Original language: English
- No. of episodes: 4

Production
- Running time: 300 minutes

Original release
- Network: ABC
- Release: 6 April 1985 – 1985

Flight into Hell is a 1985 television miniseries about German pilot Hans Bertram and his co-pilot who go missing in 1932, based on Bertram's book of the same name, and in what was also known as 1932 Kimberley rescue.

== Cast ==
- Helmut Zierl as Hans Bertram
- Werner Stocker as Adolph Klausmann
- Robin Cuming as Captain Mitchell
- Dennis Grosvenor as Constable Maxwell
- Gerard Kennedy as Sgt. Steve Lucas
- Charito Ortez as Wilhelmina
- Philip Quast as Chris Gordon
- Anne Tenney as Kate Webber
- Banduk Marika
- Joan Sydney
- Peter Whitford
- Les Foxcroft
- Norman Kaye
