= Kangaroo River =

Kangaroo River may refer to the following watercourses:

- Kangaroo River (Clarence Valley), New South Wales, Australia
- Kangaroo River (Shoalhaven), New South Wales, Australia
  - Kangaroo River Nature Reserve

== See also ==
- Kangaroo (disambiguation)
