= HMS Tenedos (H04) =

Destroyer of the Royal Navy

Coordinates: 6°57′17″N 79°51′20″E

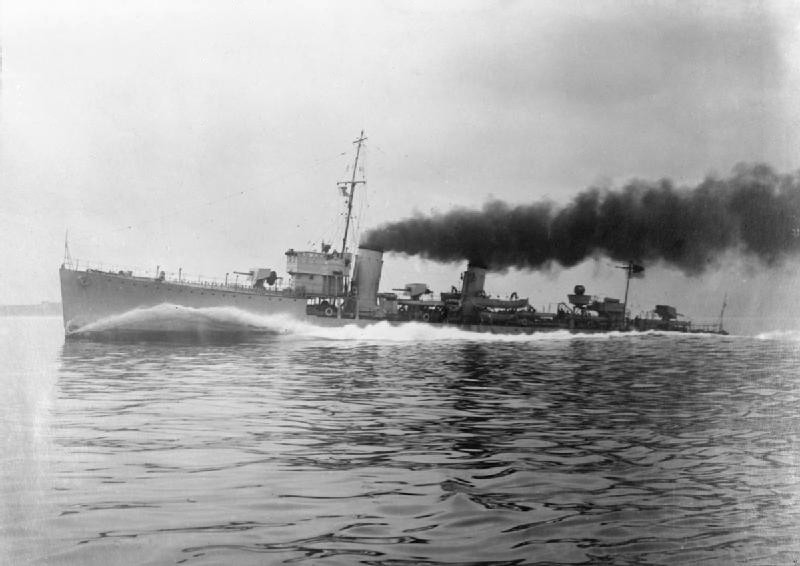
- HMS Tenedos in 1921

History

United Kingdom
- Name: HMS Tenedos (H04)
- Ordered: 9 April 1917
- Builder: Hawthorn Leslie
- Laid down: 6 December 1917
- Launched: 21 October 1918
- Commissioned: 1919
- Motto: Alteri aut utrumque; (latin: "With either or both")
- Fate: Sunk by Japanese aircraft 5 April 1942

General characteristics
- Class & type: Admiralty 'S' class destroyer

HMS Tenedos (Pennant number initially FA4 and later H04) was an Admiralty 'S' class destroyer. Laid down on 6 December 1917, she was constructed by Hawthorn Leslie of Tyne, and was completed in 1918. She was commissioned in 1919 and served throughout the interwar period.

== Construction and design ==
Tenedos was ordered from the Tyneside shipbuilding company Hawthorn Leslie on 23 June 1917, as part of the Twelfth War Programme, one of 36 destroyers ordered on that date, including four Admiralty S-class destroyers ordered from Leslies.

Tenedos was 276 feet (84.12 m) long overall and 265 feet (80.77 m) between perpendiculars, with a beam of 26 feet 8 inches (8.13 m) and a draught of 9 feet 10 inches (3.00 m). Displacement was 905 long tons (920 t) standard and 1,221 long tons (1,241 t) full load. Three Yarrow boilers fed steam at 250 pounds per square inch (1,700 kPa) to two sets of Brown-Curtiss single-reduction steam turbines rated at 27,000 shaft horsepower (20,000 kW) at 360 rpm which in turn drove two propeller shafts. This gave a speed of 36 knots (67 km/h; 41 mph). 301 long tons (306 t) of oil could be carried, giving a range of 2,750 nautical miles (5,090 km; 3,160 mi) at 15 knots (28 km/h; 17 mph). The ship had a crew of 90 officers and men.

Three 4 inch (102 mm) guns were carried, together with a single 2-pounder (40 mm) "pom-pom" anti-aircraft gun. Torpedo armament was four 21 inch (533 mm) torpedo tubes in two twin rotating mounts and two 18 inch tubes at the break of the ship's forecastle for snap shots at close range. Later ships of the class had the 18 inch tubes left off, while they were removed from the ships that were fitted to them between the wars.

Tenedos was laid down at Leslie's Hebburn shipyard on 6 December 1917, launched on 21 October 1918 and completed in July 1919.

== Service ==
Tenedos commissioned later in 1919, joining the 4th Destroyer Flotilla of the Atlantic Fleet. In December 1924, Tenedos was under refit at Chatham Dockyard.

In September 1930, it was announced that Tenedos, in maintenance reserve at Rosyth, would be recommissioned to replace sister ship Seawolf, based at Cobh in the Republic of Ireland, after Seawolf had been damaged in a collision with a trawler, with Seawolf to be disposed of. In April 1932, it was announced that Tenedos and Sturdy would be replaced at the Irish station by Amazon and Ambuscade, with Tenedos and Sturdy transferring to the reserve. In December 1933, it was announced that Tenedos would transfer from reserve at Portsmouth to Devonport, where she would serve as spare emergency destroyer. On 7 February 1936, the Daunt Rock lightship broke free from her moorings near Cork Harbour. Attempts by Tenedos to take the drifting lightship under tow were unsuccessful, and the crew of the lightship were eventually rescued by the Ballycotton lifeboat. Tenedos was transferred to the China Station (as the Royal Navy's forces in the West Pacific, Singapore and China were known), going into reserve at Singapore in March 1938.

In August 1939, Tenedos, along with sister ships Scout, Thanet and Thracian, formed a local defence flotilla at Hong Kong. On 24 August 1939 Tenedos and Scout left Hong Kong for Singapore. When the two destroyers arrived at Singapore on 28 August, they were quickly converted to minelayers, which involved removal of one 4 inch gun and the torpedo tubes to accommodate 40 mines. The two destroyers laid a defensive minefield of 544 mines off Singapore between 4 and 8 September 1939, after which Scout was returned to normal destroyer configuration, while Tenedos continued on minelaying duties, with two more minefields being laid off Singapore by October 1939. Two merchant ships, Høegh Transporter and Sirdhana, were sunk by these minefields in October–November 1939. Tenedos then had her normal destroyer armament refitted. On 23 March 1940, the Royal Navy formed Malaya Force, with the intention of preventing German merchant ships from leaving harbours in the Dutch East Indies. Tenedos, along with Stronghold was assigned to patrol off Sabang, where five German ships were trapped. The German merchant ships were seized by the Dutch following the German invasion of the Netherlands in May 1940.

Tenedos was still based at Singapore on 2 December when the battleship Prince of Wales and the battlecruiser Repulse arrived. On 5 December, Repulse left Singapore for a visit to Darwin, Australia, with Tenedos and HMAS Vampire, but they were recalled on 6 December when two large Japanese convoys were spotted by an RAF aircraft. Early on 8 December Japanese bombers attacked Singapore, and later that day, Force Z, comprising Prince of Wales and Repulse, escorted by the destroyers Electra, Express, Vampire and Tenedos set out to attack the Japanese invasion fleets. At about 18:30 hr on 9 December, Tenedos, now short of fuel, was released from Force Z, and set out to return to Singapore, with orders to make radio contact with base at 08:00 the next morning telling Singapore of the planned course of Force Z, while the main fleet maintained radio silence. Force Z made two major course changes after Tenedos left, turning south for Singapore at 20:15 on 9 December and then, at 00:52 on 10 December, heading towards Kuantan on the East coast of Malaya to investigate reports of Japanese landings. The predicted course broadcast by Tenedos therefore did not match Force Z's actual course, preventing any attempts to provide air cover over Force Z. Tenedos was attacked by 9 Mitsubishi G3M bombers searching for Force Z between 09:50 and 10:20 on 10 December but was undamaged. Force Z itself came under heavy Japanese air attack from 11:13, with both Prince of Wales and Repulse sunk by Japanese bombs and torpedoes by 13:20 hr.

After the loss of the capital ships, Tenedos, along with other British and Allied warships at Singapore, was employed in escorting shipping between Singapore and the Sunda Strait. Tenedos and the Australian cruiser Hobart left Singapore, threatened by advancing Japanese forces, for Batavia on 2 February. On 3 February, the two ships rescued survivors from the merchant ship Norah Moller, which had been sunk by Japanese bombers in the Bangka Strait, Tenedos picking up 13 and Hobart 57. In late February 1942, Japanese forces prepared to invade Java. Vice Admiral Conrad Helfrich, commander of Allied naval forces in the Dutch East Indies, ordered Tenedos, together with the cruisers Hobart, Danae and Dragon and the destroyer Scout, forming the Allied Western Force, to sail from Batavia towards Bangka Island and Belitung in search of Japanese forces, while most of the rest of the available forces in the region were sent to reinforce Rear Admiral Karel Doorman's squadron. When Doorman's force was defeated at the Battle of the Java Sea on 27 February, the Western Force, including Tenedos, escaped through the Sunda Strait to Ceylon, picking up refugees from Padang on 1 March, and reaching Colombo between 5 and 6 March.

== Sinking ==
In April 1942, the Japanese launched a raid into the Indian Ocean by its fast carrier forces. A RCAF Catalina flying boat spotted the Japanese fleet 350 miles south-east of Ceylon on 4 April and radioed a sighting report before being shot down. Thus warned, all shipping in Colombo and Trincomalee harbours was ordered to leave port and disperse to avoid the impending Japanese attack. Tenedos, however, was under repair in Colombo harbour and unable to leave, and was sunk with the loss of 33 officers and men by Japanese bombers when they attacked on 5 April. The wreck was removed in February 1944 by HM salvage vessel Salviking.

== Bibliography ==
- Barnett, Correlli (2000). Engage the Enemy More Closely: The Royal Navy in the Second World War. London: Classic Penguin. ISBN 0-141-39008-5.
- Friedman, Norman (2009). British Destroyers: From Earliest Days to the Second World War. Barnsley, UK: Seaforth Publishing. ISBN 978-1-84832-049-9.
- Gardiner, Robert; Gray, Randal, eds. (1985). Conway's All The World's Fighting Ships 1906–1921. London: Conway Maritime Press. ISBN 0-85177-245-5.
- Gill, G. Hermon (1957). Volume I – Royal Australian Navy, 1939–1942. Australia in the War of 1939–1945. Canberra, Australia: Australian War Memorial.
- Lenton, H. T. (1970). Navies of the Second World War: British Fleet & Escort Destroyers Volume One. London: Macdonald & Co. ISBN 0-356-02950-6.
- Middlebrook, Martin; Mahoney, Patrick (2001). Battleship: The Sinking of the Prince Of Wales and the Repulse. Classic Penguin. ISBN 0-14-139119-7.
- Rohwer, Jürgen; Hümmelchen, Gerhard (1992). Chronology of the War at Sea 1939–1945. London: Greenhill Books. ISBN 1-85367-117-7.
- Shores, Christopher; Cull, Brian; Izawa, Yasuho (1992). Bloody Shambles: Volume One: The Drift to War to the Fall of Singapore. London: Grub Street. ISBN 0-948817-50-X.
- Shores, Christopher; Cull, Brian; Izawa, Yasuho (1993). Bloody Shambles: Volume Two: The Defence of Sumatra to the Fall of Burma. London: Grub Street. ISBN 0-948817-67-4.
- Smith, Peter C. (2005). Into the Minefields: British Destroyer Minelaying 1916–1960. Barnsley, UK: Pen & Sword Maritime. ISBN 1-84415-271-5.
- Whitley, M. J. (2000). Destroyers of World War Two: An Illustrated Encyclopedia. London: Cassell & Co. ISBN 1-85409-521-8.
