= LK Sailing =

History
- Namesake: Frank Konecny
- Builder: Australian Shipping Industries
- Yard number: 292
- In service: 21 December 1990
- Identification: IMO number: 8820937

General characteristics
- Tonnage: 1,571 GRT, 3,454 DWT
- Propulsion: MAN B&W Alpha 6S26MC
- Speed: 13 knots

LK Sailing is a cargo ship. Built by Australian Shipping Industries for Stateships, it has subsequently operated for other shipping lines under a variety of names. As at April 2026 it remains operational.

== History ==
Built as the Frank Konecny by Australian Shipping Industries in Henderson, Western Australia, for Stateships, the ship entered service in December 1990. It was named after Frank Konecny.

In 1995 it was sold along with sister ships Roberta Jull and Gordon Reid by owner Westpac to Briese Schiff, Germany and renamed Wotan.. In 1996 it was sold to Straits Shipping, Singapore and renamed Straits Joy, and In 1998 to Conway Castle Shipping, Antigua and renamed Marie Therese.

In 2003 it was sold to Bristol Strait, Antigua and renamed Bristol Strait and in 2005 to J Strahmer, Germany as African Express. It was later sold to Partenreederei Motor Ships, Antigua and renamed Angola Express and in August 2007 to Ibre Redereja Sia, Riga Lativiia and renamed Irbe Loja.

As at April 2026 it remains operational as the LK Sailing.
