= Palm Trader =

History
- Namesake: Media
- Owner: Cunard (1963-1971); Stateships (1971-1978); Seaforth Investment Trust (1978-1987)
- Operator: Cunard (1963-1971); Stateships (1971-1978); Seaforth Investment Trust (1978-1987)
- Port of registry: (United Kingdom) Liverpool (1963-1971); (Australia) Fremantle (1971-1978); (Greece) Piraeus (1978-1987)
- Builder: John Readhead & Sons
- Yard number: 612
- Launched: 20 June 1963
- Completed: October 1963
- Identification: Official number 303887
- Fate: Caught fire October 1983, sank 1987
- Status: Sank

General characteristics
- Tonnage: 5,586 GRT; 7,300 DWT
- Length: 436.9 ft (133.2 m)
- Beam: 60.3 ft (18.4 m)
- Height: 24.7 ft (7.5 m)
- Propulsion: Sulzer 7RD68
- Speed: 17 knots

Palm Trader was a Greek cargo ship that caught fire in 1983. Built by John Readhead & Sons, South Shields for Cunard, it subsequently operated for Stateships and other shipping lines.

== History ==
Built as the Media by John Readhead & Sons, South Shields for Cunard, the ship was delivered in October 1963. She was the second ship of her name constructed for the company, the first having been built in 1946 and sold to Italian buyers in 1961. In June 1971 it was sold to Stateships and renamed Beroona after being modified at the Taikoo Dockyard, Hong Kong.

In 1976, the Beroona was withdrawn from North West Australia services and began operating to Western Port and Burnie.

In December 1978 it was sold to the Seaforth Investment Trust, Monrovia, being resold to Greece and renamed the Palm Trader. It caught fire on 18 October 1983 while anchored at Bandar Abbas, It was declared a total loss and in 1987 sank off Larak Island.
