= Kangaroo word =

Word that contains letters of another word, in order, with the same meaning

A kangaroo word is a word that contains all the letters of one of its synonyms or a closely related word, called a joey word, arranged so that these letters appear in the same order in both words. For example, the word inflammable is a kangaroo word containing the joey word flammable; the words action, appropriate [has apt], chocolate [has cocoa] and advertisement (a twin kangaroo, containing ad and advert) also each include their own synonyms/related words.

== Etymology ==
The phrase kangaroo word is derived from the fact that kangaroos carry their young, known as joeys, in a body pouch. Likewise, kangaroo words carry their joey words within themselves.

== Variations ==
In a kangaroo word, the letters of the joey word may also be separated, as in masculine, which contains the letters of male scattered throughout. Another example is precipitation, containing the word rain. Some compilers in fact require that the letters of the joey word not be consecutive within the kangaroo word (for example: borough carries burgh, and junction carries join, but the letters are not in the normal order) or may stipulate that the kangaroo and joey words be etymologically unrelated; so that in both cases words such as: action (act), healthiness (health), advertisement (ad), malignant (malign), and inflammable (flammable), would not qualify.

A twin kangaroo is a kangaroo word that contains two joey words (for example: container features both tin and can, magister features both master and mister). In contrast, an anti-kangaroo word is a word that contains its antonym (for example: covert carries overt, animosity carries amity). A grand kangaroo is a kangaroo word which has two joeys, one of which is in the pouch of the other. For instance, alone is a grand kangaroo since it contains lone, which carries its own synonym one.

== History ==
Kangaroo words were originally popularized as a word game by Ben O'Dell in an article for The American Magazine, volume 151, during the 1950s, later reprinted in Reader's Digest.

== See also ==
- RAS syndrome
- Recursive acronym
- Tautology (language)
