= Norah Moller =

Ship built in 1915

History
- Builder: Harland & Wolff
- Yard number: 452
- Launched: 9 July 1914
- Completed: 22 October 1915
- Identification: Official number 131682
- Fate: Sunk by Japanese aircraft 4 February 1942

General characteristics
- Tonnage: 4,348 GRT, 3,912 DWT
- Propulsion: Burmeister & Wain diesel
- Speed: 10 knots

Norah Moller was a ship built by Harland & Wolff in 1915. It operated for Stateships as the Kangaroo, later being sold and renamed Norah Moller. It was sunk by Japanese aircraft in the Sunda Strait in February 1942.

== History ==
The ship was ordered from Harland & Wolff, Irvine, Scotland by the East Asiatic Company, Copenhagen being launched in July 1914 as the Lanandia. Upon completion in 1915 it was purchased by Stateships and operated for the remainder of World War I in Europe. After being refurbished in Southampton, it arrived in Western Australia in 1921. Although intended to primarily operate on Stateships' North West Australia coast services from Fremantle, it spent more time on overseas voyages.

In August 1938 it was sold to Moller & Company, Shanghai and renamed the Norah Moller. On 1 February 1942 was attacked by Japanese aircraft in the Banka Strait. It sank on 3 February 1942 in the Sunda Strait with 17 lives lost. Seventy people were rescued from life rafts by HMAS Hobart and HMS Tenedos.
