= Baltavia =

History
- Builder: Stabilimento Tecnico Triestino
- Completed: August 1901
- Fate: Scrapped

General characteristics
- Tonnage: 2,937 GRT, 2,833 DWT
- Propulsion: Triple expansion engine
- Speed: 18 knots (33 km/h; 21 mph)

Baltavia was a ship by Stabilimento Tecnico Triestino for the Chinese Eastern Railway in 1901 and subsequently operated by a number of other operators.

== History ==
The ship was built in 1901 by Stabilimento Tecnico Triestino, Trieste for the Chinese Eastern Railway as the Monogolia for passenger services between Vladivostock and Shanghai. It was used as a hospital ship in the Russo-Japanese War in 1904/05.

In May 1912 it was purchased from the Russian East Asiatic Steamship Company by Stateships and renamed Western Australia. Although fast on the service from Fremantle to North West Australia ports, it consumed too much coal and departed in June 1916 for England to be sold.

It was requisitioned by the British Admiralty for use as a hospital ship between France and England. On 28 January 1918 it collided with and sank the torpedo gunboat HMS Hazard off Portland Bill. At the end of World War I it was returned to Stateships and sold to Rederi Akab Svenska Lloyd, Gothenburg as the Patricia operating between Gothenburg and London. It was sold in 1929 to United Baltic Corporation, London and renamed Baltavia for service from London to Baltic ports. It was scrapped in 1935.
