= Yara (ship) =

Australian cargo and passenger ship

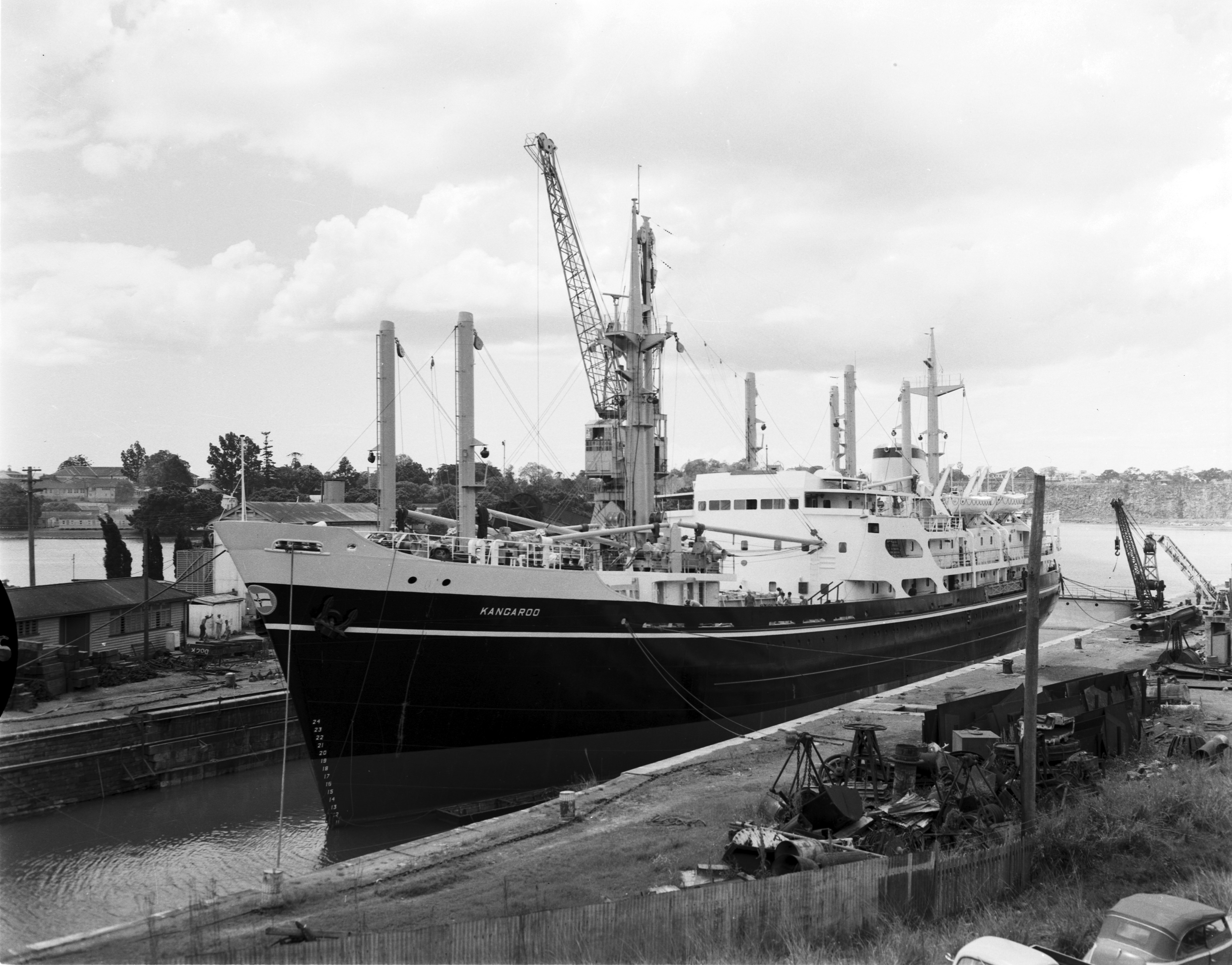
- Kangaroo under construction at Evans Deakin & Company

History
- Builder: Evans Deakin & Company
- Launched: 3 February 1962
- Maiden voyage: 8 December 1962
- Identification: Official number 196921

General characteristics
- Tonnage: 4,129 GRT, 2,455 DWT
- Propulsion: Polar M47M
- Speed: 13 knots
- Capacity: 94 passengers

Yara was a cargo and passenger ship. Built by Evans Deakin & Company, Brisbane for Stateships, it operated services along the North West Australia coast.

== History ==
Built as the Kangaroo II by Evans Deakin & Company, Brisbane for Stateships, Western Australia, the ship was delivered in 1962. Although primarily operating along the North West Australia coast from Fremantle, It made several around Australia voyages. In March 1973 it operated the last Steamships passenger service.

It was sold in May 1973 to Compania de Navegacion Abeto, Panama and renamed Hong Kong Fir. It was sold in 1974 to the Fayez Trading & Shipping Company, Jeddah as Yara being converted to carry 989 pilgrims to Mecca. In December 1989 it was sold to Bangladesh for scrap.
