= Serenity 09 =

History
- Namesake: Gordon Reid
- Builder: Australian Shipping Industries
- Yard number: 293
- Christened: 13 March 1991
- In service: 13 April 1991
- Identification: IMO number: 8820949

General characteristics
- Tonnage: 1,571 GRT, 3,454 DWT
- Propulsion: MAN B&W Alpha 6S26MC
- Speed: 13 knots

Serenity 09 is a cargo ship. Built by Australian Shipping Industries for Stateships, it has subsequently operated for other shipping lines under a variety of names. As at April 2026 it remains operational.

== History ==
Built as the Gordon Reid by Australian Shipping Industries in Henderson, Western Australia, for Stateships, the ship entered service in December 1990. It was named after Gordon Reid.

In 1995 it was sold along with sister ships Roberta Jull and Frank Konecny by owner Westpac to Briese Schiff, Germany and renamed Bremer Maklur..

It was renamed Industrial Beacon in 1996, Dora Maar in 1999, back to Industrial Beacon by Alnwick Castle Shipping, Antigua & Barbuda and Beacon Strait by MS Industrial Beacon Schiffahtrs in 2003.

It was sold to Neptune Shipping Lines, Vanuatu in May 2004 as Captaine Fearn, being renamed Island Express in November 2005 by Northwest Express Line again operating out of Fremantle to the Cocos Islands, Christmas Island and Singapore. By 2017 it was operating out of Singapore as the Serenty 09. As at April 2026 it remains operational.
