= Ciudad de Oviedo (ship) =

History
- Namesake: Kimberley
- Builder: Burmeister & Wain
- Completed: May 1979
- Identification: IMO number: 7726720

General characteristics
- Tonnage: 9,867 GRT, 12,600 DWT
- Propulsion: Burmeister & Wain Alpha 12U28LU
- Speed: 16 knots

Ciudad de Oviedo was a roll-on/roll-off cargo ship. Built by Burmeister & Wain and commissioned as the Kimberley by Stateships, it subsequently operated for other shipping lines under a variety of names.

== History ==
Built as the Kimberley by Burmeister & Wain in Copenhagen for KS Difko, it wa bareboat chartered by Stateships for five years, being named Kimberley in Copenhagen, entering service in 1979. It spent most of its time on services from Fremantle to East Coast ports.

It was returned to its owner in 1984 and sold in May 1984 to Sanger Steam Ships, Panama as the Cereza. Further ownership changes were in 1988 to Aashi Marine, Panama as the Kyoto II, in 1991 to Megatide Shipping, Cyprus as the Ferrymar and in 1993 to Blancamar Naviera, Colombia as the Ciudad de Oviedo. In July 2004 it was operating for Russian principals between Brazil and West Africa.
