= HMS Kangaroo =

Seven ships of the British Royal Navy have been named HMS Kangaroo, after the kangaroo.

- HMS Kangaroo (1795), a 16-gun fir-built brig-sloop built at Rotherhithe in 1795 and sold in 1802.
- HMS Kangaroo (1805), an 18-gun Merlin-class sloop launched in 1805 and sold in 1815.
- HMS Kangaroo (1818), a survey brig purchased in 1818 in the West Indies. Re-rigged as a ship in 1823 and wrecked off Cuba in 1828.
- HMS Kangaroo (1829), a 3-gun schooner, ex-Las Damas Argentinas, purchased in 1829 and sold in 1834.
- HMS Kangaroo (1852), a 12-gun Acorn-class brig-sloop ordered as HMS Dove in 1839, renamed Kangaroo in 1843 and eventually launched in 1852. She was sold in 1897.
- HMS Kangaroo was the Philomel-class gunvessel HMS Dart, launched in 1860, renamed Kangaroo in 1882 and broken up in 1884.
- HMS Kangaroo (1900), a B-class torpedo boat destroyer launched in 1900 and sold in 1920.

== See also ==
- HM Colonial brig Kangaroo (1812), an armed brig based in Australia from 1814 to 1817, and sold in 1818
- HMAS Kangaroo, a ship of the Royal Australian Navy
