= J. Tidmarsh & Co =

Australian soap and candle manufacturer

J. Tidmarsh & Co. was a soap and candle manufacturer in the early days of Adelaide, in the colony of South Australia.

== History ==
John Francis Tidmarsh (17 January 1824 – 11 November 1906) was born in Cork, Ireland, where he was educated at Dr. Radcliffe's school. At age 17 he joined the office of Dublin architect Anthony as an assistant draftsman and went on to assist in the Ordnance Surveys of Ireland, Lancashire, Yorkshire, and Cumberland. This was followed by parliamentary surveys of the West Riding Union Railways (later part of the Lancashire and Yorkshire Railway) and some other railway projects.

He emigrated to Australia aboard Madawaska, bound for Sydney which arrived in Adelaide in July 1849, and either decided to continue no further or returned there shortly after arriving at his destination.

He was appointed surveyor and valuator to the General Land and Building Society, Adelaide's first building society, but was persuaded by William Martin Letchford (c. 1824–1880), who had in 1848 established a candle-making factory on Sturt Street, to join him in that business, which promised to be more lucrative. Tidmarsh left Letchford & Son the following year, forming a partnership with William Moore (1822–1898), another Letchford employee, and as Moore & Tidmarsh set up a candle-making factory on South Terrace. The business proved successful, and they were able to purchase the Sturt Street factory from Letchford. In 1852 Tidmarsh joined the rush to the Victorian goldfields, leaving his partner in charge. Moore however was not to be left behind and also left to try his luck, as had most of South Australia's able-bodied men. The following year Tidmarsh returned to Adelaide and brought the factory back into production. The partnership with Moore was formally dissolved in September 1859 and, needing additional capital to expand the business, took on Letchford as a partner in May 1860, and as John Tidmarsh & Company business thrived and underwent a major expansion.

The factory on Sturt Street, between Russell and Norman streets, was by 1875 turning out 30 tons of soap and 6 tons of candles per week. The process of boiling down fat and tallow produces some particularly foul odours, and Tidmarsh was diligent in reducing this nuisance to a minimum by ventilating the vats through charcoal or quicklime. The lees were transported away from the factory in a large airtight container on wheels, to be dumped at some remote location.

The partnership was dissolved in 1877 after Letchford suffered a deterioration in his health, and Tidmarsh ran the business alone. He was in 1880 the first to introduce stearine candles to South Australia. In March 1881 he sold the business to W. H. Burford conditional on the business continuing to run with no change to the name or product. The new management was not so fastidious about reducing smells where it affected profitability, and drained the lees to the town sewerage. The Adelaide City Council was powerless to force the issue, as the factory pre-dated habitation in that part of the city, and it was not until a great fire destroyed the complex in 1919 that a move was made to Dry Creek.

Tidmarsh retired to his home in Glenelg. His wife of 35 years died in 1886. Twenty years later, after years of suffering "strained sinews" (perhaps tendinosis), Tidmarsh killed himself at home with a pistol shot to the head.

Their only surviving son, Francis Frederick Tidmarsh, about whom little is recorded but was factory foreman after Burford's took over, founded his own soap and candle manufactory in Broken Hill some time around 1888. Burford's, owners of the Adelaide Tidmarsh factory, promptly issued a statement denying any connection between the two companies. F. F. Tidmarsh was subsequently proved insolvent; in 1890 Burford's purchased the business and installed their own manager. In 1894 Tidmarsh and his family moved to Bourke, where as a member of the firm Tidmarsh, Baker & Co. he carried on with soap manufacture.

== Other interests ==
For two years Mr. Tidmarsh was a member of the Glenelg Corporation, but otherwise had little involvement with public affairs.

== Family ==
John Francis Tidmarsh (17 January 1824 – 11 November 1906) was a son of Francis Edgar Tidmarsh (c. 1789 – 8 January 1885) of Rathgar Road, Dublin. He married Sophia Birch (c. 1831 – 28 November 1886) in 1851. Their children included:

- Elizabeth Tidmarsh (1852 – 5 February 1939)
- Mary Sophia Tidmarsh (1856 – 17 December 1927)
- Francis Frederick Tidmarsh (3 December 1857 – 28 February 1934) married Emily Bailey (1857 – 11 March 1933) in 1879. He was a soap manufacturer in Broken Hill, then Bourke, New South Wales.

- Ethel Tidmarsh (23 December 1879 – ) married Clement Stanley Collison (1875–1927), son of C. N. Collison, in 1905, lived in South Australia
- Elsinore Tidmarsh (23 February 1881 – ) maybe married Dugan, lived in Yeoval, New South Wales, then Bourke
- Kathleen Tidmarsh (17 September 1882 – ) married W. Woodfield, lived in Ashfield, New South Wales, then Bourke
- Jesse Audrey Tidmarsh (1885–1885)
- Gertrude Emilia "Gertie" Tidmarsh (5 July 1886 – ) married Walter Baker on 4 May 1910, lived at Rathgar Station
- Adeline Tidmarsh (22 October 1888 – 17th Aug 1958) married William Patrick Manning, lived in Randwick, New South Wales
- Francis Edgar Tidmarsh (26 May 1884 – ) lived in Bourke

- Annie Rosalie Tidmarsh (1859 – 1934) married Patrick O'Malley in 1884

== See also ==
Some other soap and candle manufacturers of early Adelaide:

- W. H. Burford & Sons
- J. H. M. Hawkes
- Walker Brothers
- Crompton and Sons
- Thomas Mossop
- F. H. Champion
