= PWN-9 Kangaroo =

- Function: Sounding rocket
- Manufacturer: United Technologies Corporation
- Country of origin: United States

Size
- Height: 3.0 metres (10 ft)
- Diameter: 170 millimetres (6.5 in)
- Stages: Two

Launch history
- Status: Cancelled
- Launch sites: Point Mugu
- First flight: 1969

First stage – Booster
- Diameter: 170 millimetres (6.5 in)
- Powered by: 1
- Propellant: Solid

Second stage – Dart
- Height: 1.2 metres (4 ft)
- Diameter: 41.3 millimetres (1.625 in)
- Powered by: Unpowered

The XPWN-9A Kangaroo was a project to develop a sounding rocket intended for use by the United States Navy. Using an unconventional design, flight tests were unsuccessful, and it was not put into production.

== History ==
The Kangaroo was designed as a "boosted dart" type rocket, the unpropelled "dart" containing the payload being housed within the solid booster rocket's propellant, where, upon burnout, it would be ejected from the rocket by a pyrotechnic device. Rail launched, Kangaroo was intended to be used to measure radiation levels and the density of micrometeorites prior to the launch of crewed space flights.

The initial design of what was then called Kangaroo-Dart was developed by the Aeromachnics Branch of the U.S. Navy's Pacific Missile Range. Detailed design was performed by Aerojet; however when bids for developing the prototype, given the designation XPWN-9A, were requested, United Technologies Corporation submitted the winning bid and was given a contract for construction of prototypes in November 1969.

Flight trials of the Kangaroo booster were undertaken at the Pacific Missile Range at Point Mugu; they proved unsuccessful, and production of the rocket was not undertaken.
