= Eastern Peace =

History
- Builder: William Denny & Brothers, Dumbarton, Scotland
- Yard number: 1490
- Launched: 11 October 1957
- Completed: 27 May 1958
- Out of service: 1980
- Identification: Official number 19689
- Fate: Scrapped

General characteristics
- Tonnage: 3,377 GRT, 2,020 DWT
- Propulsion: British Polar Engines M47M
- Speed: 13 knots

Eastern Peace was a passenger ship that operated for Australian, Irish and Singaporean owners.

== History ==
Built as the Koolama II by William Denny & Brothers, Dumbarton for Stateships arriving in Fremantle in July 1958. It operated services along the North West Australia. In 1966 it was lengthened by 7.3 metres by Taikoo Dockyards, Hong Kong with passenger accommodation increased from 58 to 96.

It was sold in April 1973 to O'Shea's, Dublin to operate between Ireland and Europe after being modified in Singapore to carry livestock and renamed Grain Trader. In August 1974 it was sold to Eastern Steamship & Enterprises, Singapore and renamed Eastern Peace. In 1977 it was sold to Lye Shipping, Panama and in April 1980 sold for scrapping in Kaohsiung, Taiwan.

Its ship's bell is preserved at the WA Maritime Museum.
