= Yu Ying (ship) =

Cargo ship built in 1966

History
- Builder: Mitsui E&S, Tamano, Japan
- Yard number: 728
- Completed: 1966
- Identification: Official number 355141; IMO number: 6606167

General characteristics
- Tonnage: 6,103 GRT, 7,723 DWT
- Propulsion: Burmeister & Wain 6-62VT2BF140
- Speed: 17 knots

Yu Ying was a 1966 built cargo ship that operated for German, Australian and Chinese owners.

== History ==
Built as the Transontario by Mitsui E&S in Tamano, Japan for Poseidon Schiffahrt of Hamburg, the ship entered service in 1966 operating between Germany and the Great Lakes.

In August 1972 it, along with sister ship Transmichigan, was purchased by Stateships and after being modified by Evans Deakin & Company at Victoria Quay, Fremantle entered service as the Nyanda (Aboriginal for sweet lagoon) in July 1973.

The Nyanda operated services along the coast of North West Australia from Fremantle to Darwin. It was the first ship to enter Darwin Harbour in the aftermath of Cyclone Tracy in December 1974 that destroyed much of Darwin. For a period, it was the city's only communication point with the outside world.

It was sold in October 1981 to China Ocean Shipping Company, Beijing as the Yu Ying for use as a training ship, later being transferred to the Dalian Ocean Shipping Company with the same name, It was still on the Lloyd's Register under same name in 2005.
