= Kangaroo Point =

Kangaroo Point may refer to:

== New South Wales, Australia ==
- Kangaroo Point, New South Wales, a suburb in Sutherland Shire, Sydney, New South Wales, Australia
- Kangaroo Point, a point of land in the suburb of Brooklyn, New South Wales

== Queensland, Australia ==
- Kangaroo Point, Queensland, a suburb in Brisbane, Queensland, Australia
  - Kangaroo Point Cliffs, located in the suburb of Kangaroo Point, Queensland
