= Koolama Bay =

Bay in Western Australia

Coordinates: 13.93°S 127.31°E

Koolama Bay is a bay in the Kimberley region of Western Australia. It was formerly known as Rulhieres Bay prior to the MV Koolama being beached at the location after a Japanese air attack in 1942. The King George River flows into the bay.

The MV Koolama stranding site and survivor camp at Koolama Bay and Pangali Cove is significant to the Kwini people who helped the 180 passengers and crew reach safety.
