= Coolamon =

Coolamon may refer to:

- Coolamon (vessel) - an Indigenous Australian container
- Coolamon, New South Wales - an Australian town
- Coolamon Shire - an Australian local government area
- Syzygium moorei - an Australian rainforest tree
