= Asia Express I =

History
- Namesake: Pilbara
- Builder: Burmeister & Wain
- Yard number: 877
- Completed: 1981
- Identification: IMO number: 7618686

General characteristics
- Tonnage: 10,014 GRT, 12,600 DWT
- Propulsion: Burmeister & Wain Alpha 12U28LU
- Speed: 16 knots

Asia Express I is a roll-on/roll-off cargo ship. Built by Burmeister & Wain and commissioned as the Pilbara by Stateships, it has subsequently operated for other shipping lines under a variety of names.

== History ==
Construction of the ship was commenced by Burmeister & Wain in Copenhagen for KS Difko under the name Hamlet Arabia, it was launched named Hamlet Ariadne. It was bareboat chartered by Stateships, and after being modified by Hongkong United Dockyards was renamed Pilbara, arriving in Fremantle in October 1981.

On 26 November 1981 on its second voyage northwards, it struck an uncharted sand bank approaching Derby jetty damaging its hull. Temporary repairs were made to allow it to proceed to Darwin to unload, before going to Hongkong United Dockyards for repair returning in May 1982.

It was returned to owners in August 1990 and renamed Algenib. Further renamings were to Hamlet Arabia in 1991, Mercaribe I in 1991,Hamlet Arabia in 1992, Asia Express in 1996 and Asia Express I in 2005. As at 2015 it was owned by PT Perusahaan Pelayaran Equinox of Panama.
