= King George River =

River in Western Australia

King George
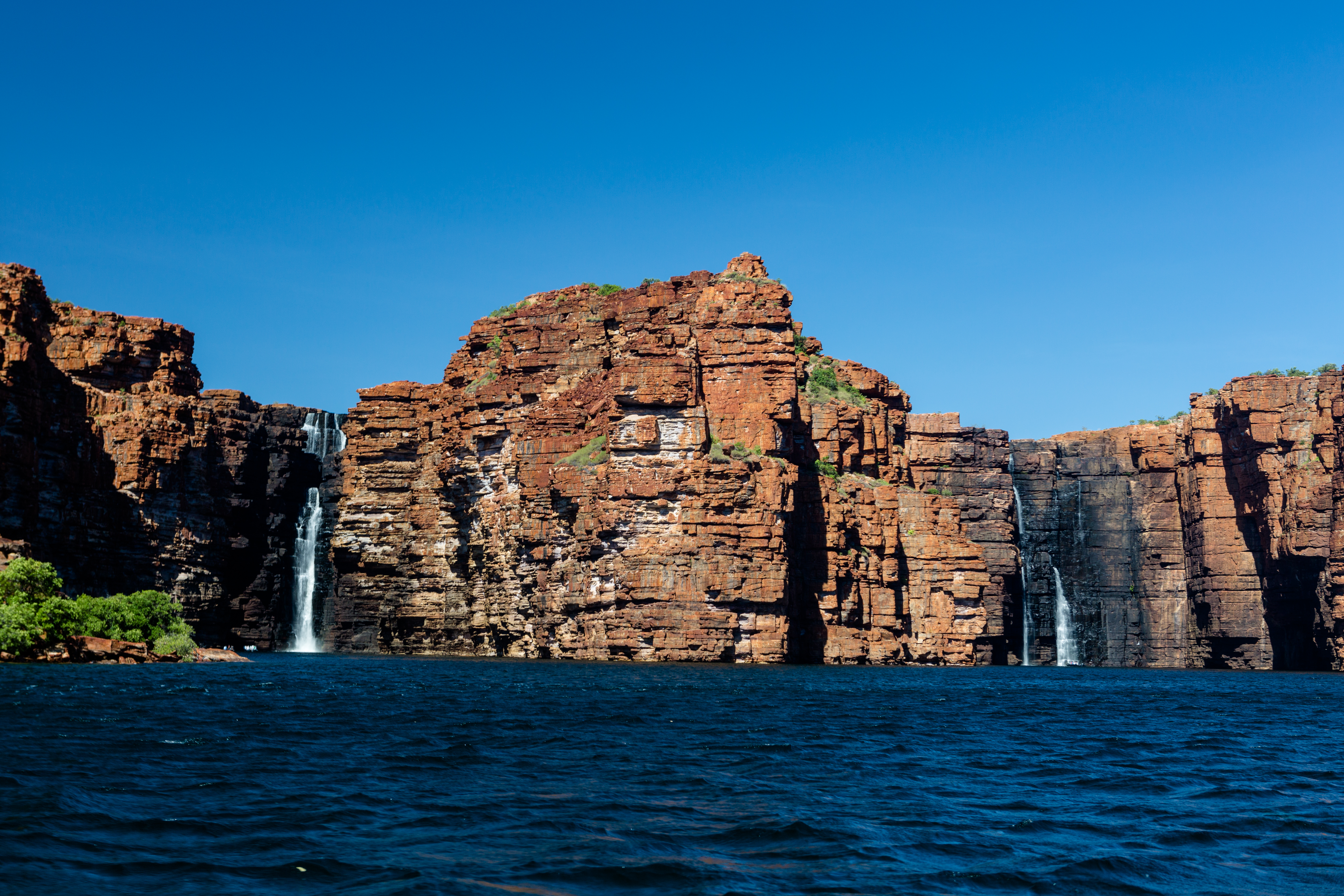
- King George Falls

- Location of the King George River mouth in Western Australia
- Etymology: In honour of King George V

Location
- Country: Australia
- State: Western Australia
- Region: Central and Northern Kimberley, Victoria Bonaparte (IBRA)
- Local government area: Wyndham–East Kimberley

Physical characteristics
- Source: Ashton Range
  - location: Oombulgurri Aboriginal Reserve, Central Kimberley
  - coordinates: 14°37′24″S 127°11′59″E
  - elevation: 212 m (696 ft)
- Mouth: Koolama Bay, Timor Sea
  - location: east of Kalumburu, Northern Kimberley
  - coordinates: 13°57′44″S 127°19′43″E
  - elevation: 0 m (0 ft)
- Length: 112 km (70 mi)

Basin features
- Tributaries
  - left: Beta Creek
- Waterfalls: King George Falls
- National park: Drysdale River National Park

The King George River is a perennial river located in the Kimberley region of Western Australia.

== Location and features ==
The traditional owners of the areas around the river are the Miwa people.

The headwaters of the river rise to the west of the Ashton Range and flow in a northerly direction through the Drysdale River National Park past the Seppelt Range, joined by one minor tributary before reaching its river mouth and emptying into Koolama Bay and the Timor Sea, approximately 70 kilometres (43 mi) east of Kalumburu. The river descends 216 metres (709 ft) over its 112-kilometre (70 mi) course, including a 38–40-metre (125–131 ft) descent over the dual drop waterfall of King George Falls, approximately 12 kilometres (7.5 mi) upriver from the river mouth. The falls are located at an elevation of 84 metres (276 ft) above sea level.

The recorded height of the waterfall varies widely, with some sources claiming the descent is in the range of 80–100 metres (262–328 ft). The area surrounding the falls are popular with tourists, who typically view the falls by boat. The falls are in full force from late December through to early May each year and gradually recede to a small flow in September. The falls were featured in Baz Luhrmann's 2008 film, Australia.

== Etymology ==
The river was named in 1911 by explorer Charles Conigrave after a privately funded expedition in the area. The river is named in honour of King George V.

== See also ==
- List of rivers of Australia § Western Australia
