= State Shipping Service of Western Australia =

Western Australian state government transport entity

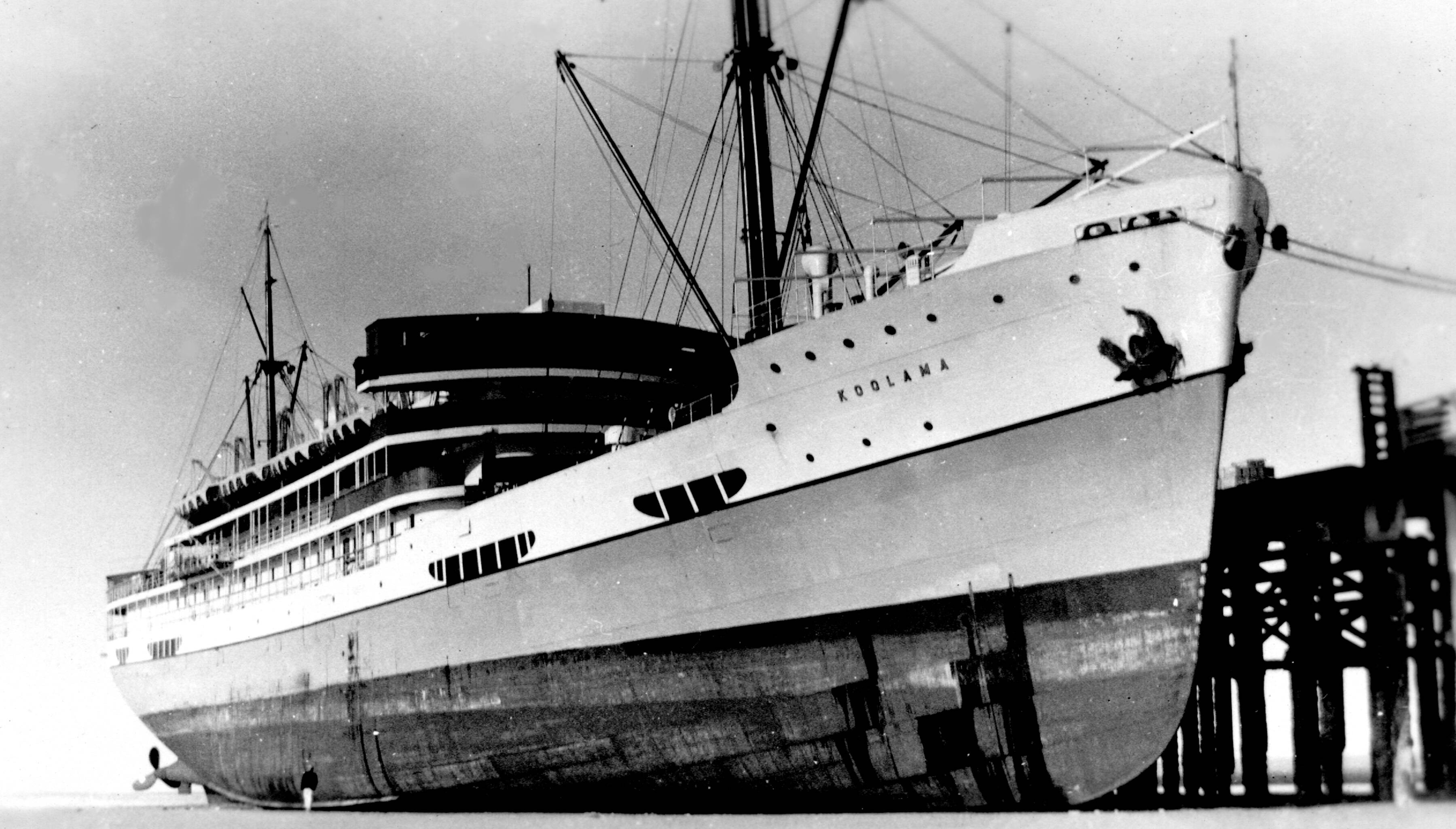
MV Koolama at Broome in about 1940.

The State Shipping Service of Western Australia was a state government transport entity formed in 1912, in Western Australia, primarily to service the ports of North West Australia.

Originally named the State Steamship Service, it was renamed as the State Shipping Service in 1919, and again in 1979 as Stateships.

== History ==
On 4 May 1912, the State Steamships Service was formed by the Scaddan government in response to requests for improved services along the North West Australian coast after the Adelaide Steamship Company withdrew its services. It was controlled by the Fremantle Harbour Trust between 1913 and 1918. In January 1919 it was renamed the State Shipping Service (SSS).

In November 1965, the SSS came under the responsibility of the newly formed Western Australian Coastal Shipping Commission. In January 1979 the service was rebranded Stateships.

In June 1995 the government announced that Stateships would cease operations, with the remaining three vessels sold. The government provided a subsidy to a privately operated service from Fremantle to Port Hedland, Broome and Wyndham until it ceased in 2013.

The Western Australian Coastal Shipping Commission, administered by the Department of Transport, continues to deal with ongoing former employee compensation claims.

== Operations ==
The service originally provided transport for passengers, goods and stock, with passenger services ceasing in 1973.

Having previously operated exclusively between Western Australian and Northern Territory ports, in 1964 the SSS began operating an irregular service that circumnavigated Australia in a clockwise direction in six weeks. The first voyage left Fremantle on 11 March 1964, calling at Darwin, Brisbane, Sydney and Melbourne. This service ceased in July 1969 with Kangaroo, Koojara and Koolama II having collectively operated 18 voyages.

== Ships ==
A collection in the J S Battye Library has a set of photographs of the ships that were used by the service.

The ships used by the service included:

- Bambra
- Beroona (built in 1963)
- Boogalla (built by Mitsui E&S at the Tamano shipyard in 1966)
- Delamere (built by Whyalla Shipyards - 1946, purchased 1957)
- Eucla (built in 1901 in Scotland)
- Frank Konecny (built by Australian Shipbuilding Industries - 1990)
- Gordon Reid (built by Australian Shipbuilding Industries - 1990)
- Irene Greenwood
- Jon Sanders
- Kabbarli (built by State Dockyard, Newcastle - 1951)
- Kangaroo I, purchased 1915.
- Kangaroo II (built by Evans Deakin & Company - 1962)
- Kimberley
- Koojarra (built by State Dockyard, Newcastle - 1956)
- Koolama I (built by Harland & Wolff, Govan - 1937)
- Koolama II (built by William Denny & Brothers, Dumbarton - 1958)
- Koolinda (built by Harland & Wolff, Govan - 1926)
- Koolinda II
- Kwinana (built by William Doxford & Sons, Sunderland as SS Darius - 1892, purchased 1912)
- Kybra, purchased 1926 and commandeered by the RAN in 1940
- Nyanda
- Pilbara
- Roberta Jull (built by Australian Shipbuilding Industries - 1990)
- Sina
- Una
- Wambiri
- Western Australia
