= Charles Price Conigrave =

Australian explorer

Charles Price Conigrave (1882–1961) was a West Australian zoologist, author and explorer. He led the Kimberley Exploring Expedition of 1911, making collections of flora and fauna, and mapping the region between Cambridge Gulf and Napier Broome Bay. Conigrave included photographs of Aboriginal art in his reports, which were published in contemporary newspapers.

On his expeditions he recorded the King George and Berkeley rivers, naming the former after the monarch and latter after his brother Berkeley Fairfax Conigrave.
