= MV Koolama =

Australian merchant vessel

Coordinates: 15.449783°S 128.101066°E

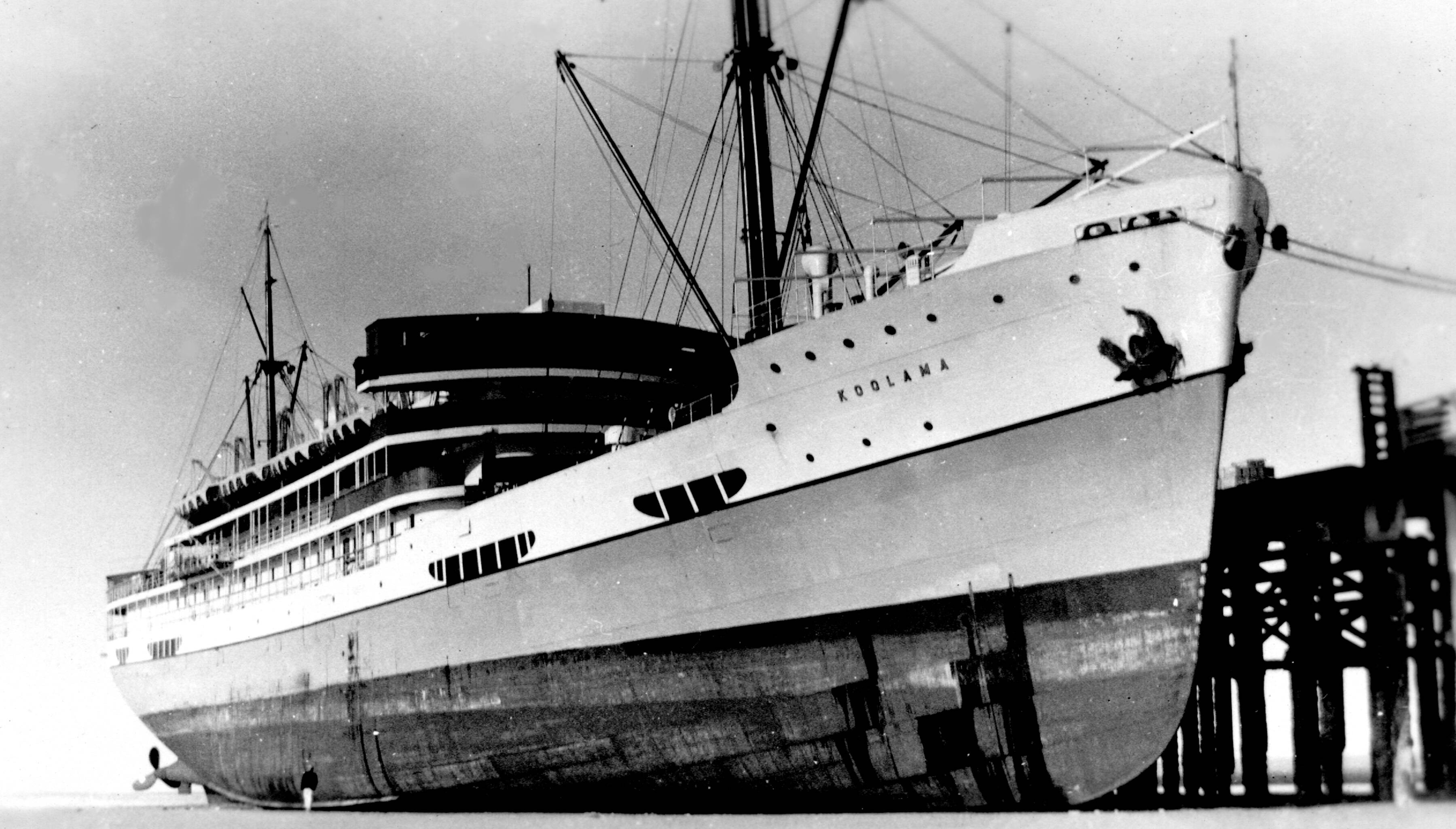
- Koolama docked at low tide at Broome, c. 1940

History

Australia
- Name: Koolama
- Owner: Government of Western Australia
- Operator: Western Australia State Shipping Service
- Port of registry: Fremantle
- Builder: Harland & Wolff Ltd., Govan
- Yard number: 1003
- Launched: 16 December 1937
- In service: 23 May 1938
- Identification: Official number: 140184
- Fate: Bombed and sunk, February/March 1942

General characteristics
- Type: Cargo/passenger motor ship
- Tonnage: 4,068 GRT; 2,113 NRT
- Length: 348 ft (106 m) o/a
- Beam: 52 ft 2 in (15.90 m)
- Depth: 18 ft 6 in (5.64 m)
- Propulsion: 2 × Burmeister & Wain 808 nhp oil-fuelled engines, 2 shafts
- Armament: 1 × 50 mm (2.0 in) gun; 2 × Vickers .303 machine guns

MV Koolama was an Australian merchant vessel that sank as a result of several attacks by Japanese aircraft in February–March 1942. It was also the centre of the Koolama Incident, an alleged mutiny resulting from these attacks.

== General description ==
Koolama was built in 1937, by Harland and Wolff of Glasgow, Scotland for the State Shipping Service, at a cost of £250,000, and was registered at Fremantle. Her official displacement was 4,068 tons (4133 tonnes), she was 348 feet (106 m) long, with a beam of 54 feet, and had diesel engines driving two propellers. Koolama could accommodate about 200 passengers and 90 crew, 500 live cattle and had a freezer hold for cargo such as meat. She was used mostly for passenger and general freight transport on coastal routes in Western Australian (WA) waters. Koolama is sometimes confused with another State Ships vessel of a similar design, Koolinda.

== Service history ==
The ship's master, Captain Jack Eggleston, his officers, and crew travelled to Glasgow in early 1938 to take delivery of the ship, and after successful sea trials she sailed for Australia on 7 April. The ship entered service on 23 May, sailing north from Fremantle to Darwin, calling at various ports in between.

=== War service and the "Koolama incident" ===
In January 1942, following the outbreak of war with Japan, Koolama carried members of the ill-fated 8th Division and their equipment to Ambon and West Timor, in Netherlands East Indies. On the return voyage she carried Dutch refugees to Darwin.

On 10 February 1942, Koolama – still under Captain Eggleston – sailed from Fremantle, bound for Darwin with Australian Army personnel and equipment, as well as some convicts on work release and regular civilian passengers. Although the soldiers on board were armed only with rifles, the ship carried a 50 mm (1.97 in) gun on its rear poop deck, which was intended for use against submarines and could not be aimed above level for anti-aircraft purposes. Koolama varied Vickers 0.303-inch machine guns mounted on each side of the bridge.

At 11.30 am on 20 February 1942, a day after the first Japanese air raids on Darwin, Koolama was off the coast of the Kimberley, when it was attacked by a Japanese Kawanishi H6K flying boat near Cape Londonderry. Three or four bombs landed near the ship and caused no damage. Eggleston reported the attack by radio and continued towards Darwin.

At 1.30pm, three Kawanishis – led by Lieutenant Commander Tsunaki Yonehara – attacked the ship again, over a period of 30 minutes. Three bombs hit the ship. One 60 kg (132 lb) bomb, dropped from a height of 800 m (2,625 ft), went through wooden decking, struck a civilian passenger, Raymond Theodore "Bluey" Plummer, glancing blows to his head, arm and foot, before falling into an engine room and exploding. Plummer was facing down and a tailfin on the bomb struck the back of his head, peeling away the scalp as far as his nose, along with a piece of his skull. Although Plummer's brain was partly exposed, he remained alive, albeit unconscious. The bomb also caused injuries to his arm and foot. Two other passengers were also injured.

Koolama was severely damaged. Later that afternoon, with the ship taking water at the stern, and its steering and internal communications out of action, Eggleston decided to beach the ship in Rulhieres Bay (later known as Koolama Bay). He sent an SOS by radio and ordered that the ship be evacuated by lifeboat, but did not officially abandon Koolama. The following day, as the evacuees awaited help in an inhospitable area of mangroves, inhabited by many saltwater crocodiles, Japanese planes attacked again without effect.

Eggleston and his first officer, Ken Reynolds – who was also a qualified ship's master – disagreed regarding the best course of action. The captain wanted to refloat Koolama, using the high tide, and head back to the small port of Wyndham; he believed that the ship could pump out enough water to survive 48 hours at sea, and could be steered with its engines. However, Reynolds believed that Koolama should be abandoned. The crew split into two factions along these lines. Because of this, some people later accused Reynolds of mutiny.

While they waited for assistance, the crew undertook some repairs to the stern.

On 25 February, a lugger crewed by Benedictine priests and Aboriginal people from the nearest settlement, Drysdale River Mission (later known as Kalumburu), almost 100 kilometres (80 mi) away, arrived to take the sick, wounded and women passengers to the mission, a journey of 24 hours. After enduring a week on the shore, most of the passengers and crew members began to walk to Drysdale River, guided by a priest.

By 1 March, all possible on-site repairs has been completed and the badly damaged Koolama, with Eggleston, 18 crew members, three civilian passengers and two military personnel, was refloated and set off for Wyndham. The bomb damage, including blown rivets, was worsened by the stress of movement, and as Koolama approached the port on the morning of 2 March, about 24 hours after leaving Rulhieres Bay, its pumps could no longer keep up with the inflow of water.

By 7pm, Eggleston and his party had unloaded most of the cargo, including army vehicles and other military equipment. The pumps were run throughout the night and unloading resumed at 6.00 am. However, the pumps were becoming clogged with mud and the ship was still taking water. Just after 7.00 am on 3 March, eight Japanese Zero fighters, led by Toshitada Kawazoi, made a strafing attack on Wyndham. This air raid caused no apparent damage to the Koolama, but Eggleston and his crew remained on shore for the rest of the day, in case follow-up raids occurred. By 4pm, Koolama was down at the stern and listing to starboard. At about 4.45 pm the ship rolled onto its side in the shallow water. It was written off.

== Aftermath ==
Meanwhile, some of the crew and passengers at Rulhieres Bay were rescued by flying boat, and arrived in Broome on 3 March 1942, just after a devastating air raid on the town. A further 19 men had to wait for the return of the mission lugger.

On 5 March, Plummer was flown from Drysdale River to Darwin, for more intensive medical treatment. He underwent more than 40 operations resulting from his injuries, but lived until the early 1980s.

One man had died while walking to Drysdale River and he was buried at the mission. He was the only fatality resulting from the attacks on the Koolama.

Later in 1942, a Marine Board of Inquiry exonerated all the crew members of any wrongdoing. Both Eggleston and Reynolds had long careers, including positions as Marine Superintendents, with the State Shipping Service.

In 1947, an attempt to refloat Koolama was unsuccessful. The hull was raised the following year, only to clear Wyndham harbour. It was towed out to sea and scuttled.

== Documentary ==
- 2003 - Malice or Mutiny: The Koolama Incident (dir. Ingo Helbig)

== Bibliography ==
- Clarke, R. G. (1998). "Question 37/97". Warship International. XXXV (4): 414–415. ISSN 0043-0374.
- Helbig, Ingo (2003). Malice or Mutiny: The Koolama Incident (documentary film; Storyteller Productions: Willetton, WA)
- Loane, Bill (2004). The Koolama Incident. Kenthurst, NSW: Rosenberg Publishing. ISBN 9781877058196.
- Perez, Eugene (1981). The Kalumburu War Diary. Perth, WA: Artlook Books.
