= Berkeley River =

River in Western Australia

Coordinates: 14°21′09″S 127°47′20″E

Location
- Country: Australia

Physical characteristics
- Source
  - location: Tadarida Scarp
  - elevation: 422 metres (1,385 ft)
- Mouth
  - location: Timor Sea
  - elevation: sea level
- Length: 135 km (84 mi)
- Basin size: 5,149 km^{2} (1,988 sq mi)

The Berkeley River is a river in the Kimberley region of Western Australia.

The river flows for 135 km to the Timor Sea via the Joseph Bonaparte Gulf near Reveley Island and Cape St Lambert.

The river rises from the Tadrida Scarp and flows in a north-easterly direction through the Drysdale River National Park and the Oombulgarri Indigenous Reserve before discharging into the Timor Sea. The river has two tributaries, the De Lancourt River and Casuarina Creek.

The traditional owners of the areas around the river are the Miwa people.

The river was named in 1911 by the explorer Charles Price Conigrave. He named the river after his brother Berkeley Fairfax Conigrave.
