= Wangkatha =

Indigenous Australian people

Wangkatha, otherwise written Wongatha, Wongutha, Wangkatja, Wongi or Wangai, is a language and the identity of eight Aboriginal Australian peoples of the Eastern Goldfields region. The Wangkatja language groups cover the following towns: Coolgardie, Kalgoorlie, Menzies, Leonora and Laverton; these towns encompass the North-eastern Goldfields region of Western Australia.

== Name ==
The term wangai/wongi derives from a verbal root meaning 'to speak'. (Note: The early ethnographer R. H. Mathews, reported that the Loritja verb for "to speak" was wonkanye, while that of the tribe around Erlistoun, the traditional area of the Pini, was wongi.)

The more formal and correct term is either Wangkatha or Wongatha. Other spellings include Wongutha and Wangkatja.

== Country ==
The Wongi or Wongatha/Wangkatha language peoples originate from the following areas; Coolgardie, Kalgoorlie, Leonora, Menzies and Laverton. The Wongi group consists of eight peoples: Maduwongga, Waljen, Ngurlutjarra, Ngaanyatjarra, Bindinni, Madatjarra(?), Koara (Kuwarra) and Tjalkatjarra. The Wongi Wongatha-Wonganarra Aboriginal Corporation was put into liquidation in 2010. Today, their native title land rights interests are represented by the Goldfields Aboriginal Land and Sea Council Corporation.

== Language ==
Wangkatha is still spoken and has roughly 200–300 fluent speakers. Most speakers reside in their traditional country including Coolgardie, Kalgoorlie, Menzies, Leonora, Laverton, Cosmo Newberry and Mulga Queen. The eight tribes who speak Wongi as a collective, have also their own distinct dialects which are also their tribes.

== Notable people ==
- Mrs. Sadie Canning MBE OAM. Mrs. Canning was the first Aboriginal Nurse and Matron in Australia. Mrs. Canning was the head matron at Leonora Hospital in the 1950s. The book called Our Black Nurses: in their own right recognizes Mrs. Canning as the First Aboriginal Nurse and Matron in Australia.
- Mrs. May O'Brien BEM. Mrs. O'Brien was the first Aboriginal female teacher in the state of WA.
- Mr. Ben Mason OBE. Mr. Mason was an Aboriginal evangelist and the only Aboriginal evangelist to have travelled with the late Billy Graham Ministries.
- Mr. James Brennan OAM. Mr. Brennan was a local WW2 veteran and survivor.
- Miss Gloria Brennan. Miss Brennan was the first Aboriginal person to graduate from the University of Western Australia (UWA), having completed her honors in a Bachelor of Arts with a double major in anthropology and linguistics. The Gloria Brennan scholarship is still vacant each year to aspiring Aboriginal university students at UWA.
- Miss Geraldine Hogarth AM. Miss Hogarth was awarded the Member of the Order for Australia Medal due to her commitment to preserving the Koara dialect.
- Miss Annette Stokes AM. Miss Stokes was awarded the Member of the Order for Australia Medal for her contribution to Aboriginal health research.
- Mr. Daniel Wells. AFL footballer Daniel Wells was drafted to North Melbourne Football Club.
- Delson Stokes of Yabu Band. Yabu Band is an Indigenous Australian rock, roots band formed in the mid-1990s in Kalgoorlie. The word yabu is Wongutha – a western desert tribal language – for 'rock' or 'gold'.
- Boyd Stokes of Yabu Band. Yabu Band is an Indigenous Australian rock, roots band formed in the mid-1990s in Kalgoorlie. The word yabu is Wongutha – a western desert tribal language – for 'rock' or 'gold'.
- Mr. Syd Jackson - WAFL/VFL Champion player for East Perth and Carlton. Member of the Indigenous Team of the Century and East Perth team of the Century, Syd was taken from his family as a child and raised in Roelands Mission near Bunbury.

== See also ==
- Indigenous Australians
- Aboriginal history of Western Australia
- Australian outback literature of the 20th century

== Sources ==
- "AIATSIS map of Indigenous Australia". AIATSIS. 14 May 2024.
- Bedells, Stephen J. (2010). Incarcerating Indigenous people of the Wongatha lands in the Eastern Goldfields of Western Australia: Indigenous leaders' perspectives. Edith Cowan University M.A. thesis.
- Elkin, A. P. (1943) [First published 1938]. The Australian Aborigines: How to Understand Them (2nd ed.). Angus and Robertson.
- "Goldfields Land and Sea Council". Goldfields Land and Sea Council. 2016.
- Mathews, R. H. (October–December 1907). "Languages of Some Tribes of Western Australia". Proceedings of the American Philosophical Society. 46 (187): 361–368. JSTOR 983478.
- Muller, Craig (2004). "The 'allurements of the European presence': Examining explanations of Wongatha behaviour in the northern Goldfields of Western Australia" (PDF). Aboriginal History. 38: 59–87.
- "Notice of annual meeting of creditors: Wongatha Wonganarra Aboriginal Corporation". ASIC. 2016.
- "Tindale Tribal Boundaries" (PDF). Department of Aboriginal Affairs, Western Australia. September 2016. Archived from the original (PDF) on 8 March 2016.
