= Tjalkadjara =

The Tjalkadjara or Tjalkanti were an indigenous Australian tribe of Western Australia.

== Country ==
The Tjalkadjara's tribal homelands lay northeast of Laverton as far as Lake Throssell. Their confines were in the vicinity of Darlot to the west, and to the north, around Lake Wells. Norman Tindale estimated their tribal lands as once having covered 11,300 square miles (29,000 km^{2}). Their neighbouring tribes were the Pini on their northeastern and northern flank; the Ngaanyatjarra to the northeast; the Mandjindja and the Nangatadjara east-southeast; the Waljen to their south, and the Kuwarra to their west.

== Resources ==
The water sources available to the Tjalkadjara were scarce and in good part they had to rely on what they could extract from the roots of eucalyptus. They possessed a mine north of Laverton, at Taralguta, which was rich in solid red ochre that was much prized by other neighbouring tribes, and which formed an important part of their trading with others.

== History ==
The Tjalkadjara were eventually pushed out of their southern territory and forced to shift northwest to Darlot at the turn of the 19-20th centuries, as pressure was brought to bear on them from the Nangatadjara.

== Alternative names ==
- Tjalkumara
- Tjalkandjara
- Tjalkakari ("come this way")
- Wordako (language name)
- Tjalkani
- Djalgani, Djalgandi, Tjalgandi
- Erlistoun tribe (Note: "I have not been able to obtain the name of the tribe occupying the country between Menzies and Lake Wells, including Erlistoun, Laverton, Duketon and other places in the Mount Margaret gold field.")
- Dituwonga (Waljen exonym)

== Sources ==
- "AIATSIS map of Indigenous Australia". AIATSIS. 14 May 2024.
- Mathews, R. H. (October–December 1907). "Languages of some tribes of Western Australia". Proceedings of the American Philosophical Society. 46 (187): 361–368. JSTOR 983478.
- "Tindale Tribal Boundaries" (PDF). Department of Aboriginal Affairs, Western Australia. September 2016.
- Tindale, Norman Barnett (1974). "Tjalkadjara (WA)". Aboriginal Tribes of Australia: Their Terrain, Environmental Controls, Distribution, Limits, and Proper Names. Australian National University Press. ISBN 978-0-708-10741-6. Archived from the original on 20 March 2020.
