= Pini people =

Indigenous people of Western Australia

The Pini or Nana, or more specifically the Birniridjara, also spelt Piniridjara and Biniridjara, are an Aboriginal Australian people of Western Australia. They are part of the Western Desert cultural bloc.

== Country ==
Norman Tindale estimated Pini tribal lands to have encompassed approximately 14,000 square miles (36,000 km^{2}), west of Lake Carnegie and the ephemeral Lake Wells to its south. The land took in Erlistoun Creek and Lake Darlot. Their northern frontier ran as far as Wongawol and Princes Range

== Alternative names ==
- Piniiri
- Piniridjara, Biniridjara
- Pandjanu, Bandjanu (a toponym referring to what is known now as Bandya Station)
- Banjanu
- Tjubun
- Madutjara. (Nangatadjara exonym).
- Jabura. (Tjalkadjara exonym meaning "northerners")
- Birni
- Buranudjara (?)
- Nangaritjara (Tjalkadjara term for their language)
- Wordako (apparently indicating the language of the Lake Darlot people)

== Sources ==
- "AIATSIS map of Indigenous Australia". AIATSIS. 14 May 2024.
- Mathews, R. H. (October–December 1907). "Languages of some tribes of Western Australia". Proceedings of the American Philosophical Society. 46 (187): 361–368. JSTOR 983478.
- "Tindale Tribal Boundaries" (PDF). Department of Aboriginal Affairs, Western Australia. September 2016. Archived from the original (PDF) on 8 March 2016.
- Tindale, Norman Barnett (1974). "Pini (WA)". Aboriginal Tribes of Australia: Their Terrain, Environmental Controls, Distribution, Limits, and Proper Names. Australian National University Press. ISBN 978-0-708-10741-6. Archived from the original on 20 March 2020.
