= Ngurlu =

Aboriginal people of Western Australia

The Ngurlu, also known as the Ngulutjara or Ngurlutjarra, are an Aboriginal Australian people of Western Australia.

== Country ==
The Ngurlu lands, according to Tindale, extended over roughly 5,000 square miles (13,000 km^{2}) from Menzies to Malcolm. Their northwestern frontier ran to Mount Ida. Their eastern limits were around Lake Raeside and Yerilla, and the ephemeral salt lake known as Lake Ballard. The Ngurlu moved about over mugla scrublands as far south as where their natural boundary with the Maduwongga began, as the mulga yields way to mallee eucalypt country, with its salmon gum bushland.

== History ==
As colonial intrusions advanced into the general area, whether from gold miners or people who took up large pastoral leases, considerable pressure was put on all groups, and the westward movement of the Waljen and Nangatadjara overwhelmed the Ngurlu.

== Alternative names ==
- Jan
- Jata
- Njata
- Nata
- Ngulutjara
- Nguludjara
- Kuru
- Kurutjara

== Sources ==
- "AIATSIS map of Indigenous Australia". AIATSIS. 14 May 2024.
- "Tindale Tribal Boundaries" (PDF). Department of Aboriginal Affairs, Western Australia. September 2016. Archived from the original (PDF) on 8 March 2016.
- Tindale, Norman Barnett (1974). "Ngurlu (WA)". Aboriginal Tribes of Australia: Their Terrain, Environmental Controls, Distribution, Limits, and Proper Names. Australian National University Press. ISBN 978-0-708-10741-6. Archived from the original on 20 March 2020.
