= Eremophila regia =

Conservation status
- Priority One — Poorly Known Taxa (DEC)

Scientific classification
- Kingdom: Plantae
- Clade: Embryophytes
- Clade: Tracheophytes
- Clade: Spermatophytes
- Clade: Angiosperms
- Clade: Eudicots
- Clade: Asterids
- Order: Lamiales
- Family: Scrophulariaceae
- Genus: Eremophila
- Species: E. regia

Binomial name
- Eremophila regia Buirchell & A.P.Br.

Synonyms
- Eremophila sp. 'Princess Range'

Species of flowering plant

Eremophila regia is low-growing shrub with pink to red flowers, small thread-like leaves and that is endemic to Western Australia. It grows on rocky hilltops in the Princess Ranges.

== Description ==
Eremophila regia is a shrub that typically grows to 20–30 cm (7.9–11.8 in) high and 30–50 cm (12–20 in) wide. Its branches are grey to black and warty. The leaves are arranged alternately, green, sessile, warty, thread-like or linear, 5–11 mm (0.20–0.43 in) long and 1–1.5 mm (0.039–0.059 in) wide. The flowers are borne singly in leaf axils on a slightly curved pedicel 5–9 mm (0.20–0.35 in) long. There are five lance-shaped, green to dark pink sepals that are 8–9 mm (0.31–0.35 in) long, 2.5 mm (0.098 in) wide and curved backwards. The petal tube is pinkish red, 8–12 mm (0.31–0.47 in) long and unspotted, its inner and outer surfaces with glandular hairs. The four stamens and style extend beyond the end of the petal tube. Flowering mainly occurs between June and August but also at other times after rainfall.

== Taxonomy and naming ==
This species was first formally described in 2016 by Bevan Buirchell and Andrew Phillip Brown in the journal Nuytsia from specimens collected in the Princess Ranges in 2004. The specific epithet (regia) is from the Latin regius meaning "royal" or "regal", referring to the type location.

== Distribution and habitat ==
Eremophila regia is only known from the Princess Ranges and on Prenti Downs further east and west of Lake Carnegie. It grows on rocky hilltops in low, open shrubland in the Gascoyne biogeographic region.

== Conservation ==
Eremophila regia is classified is classified as "Priority One" by the Government of Western Australia Department of Parks and Wildlife, meaning that it is known from only one or a few locations which are potentially at risk.
