= Koara =

Indigenous people in Western Australia

The Koara people, more recently spelt Kuwarra, are an Aboriginal Australian people living in the Kuwarra Western Desert region of Western Australia. In its fullest extent it would constitute portions of land in the Pilbara, Mid West, and Goldfields-Esperance regions of Western Australia.

Most of the present-day Kuwarra may be found in Meekatharra, Cue and Wiluna areas, which are in the Mid West region.

== Country ==
Norman Tindale calculated that the Koara tribal lands embraced roughly 18,100 square miles (47,000 km^{2}), extending westwards from Mount Morgans and Leonora west to Mount Ida, taking in the areas of Lake Barlee, and Sandstone, and its northwestern boundary was west of Sandstone. The northern limits ran to Gidgee, Mount Sir Samuel and Lake Darlot. The eastern frontier lay around Mount Zephyr. Their western lands were contiguous with those of the Watjarri and Badimaya, and on the east and northeast by those of the traditional Ngaanyatjarra, Martu people and Mantjiltjarra.

== History of contact ==
Estimates of the pre-contact Kuwarra population range from 250 to several hundred. By 1980, Aboriginals with Kuwarra descent numbered a mere 60 people. The dispersion and detribalization of Aboriginal tribes in this area followed in the wake of three successive waves of immigration, beginning with the Coolgardie and Kalgoorlie gold rushes, and concluding with the discovery of uranium deposits and the development of Laverton and Agnew, in the 1960s and 70s.

The indigenous people living in and around the Yeelirrie district had their continuity and transmission of cultural across generations severely compromised by the government practice of seizing their half-caste children to be raised elsewhere, so that the latter would 'grow up' unaffected by their traditional identities. One technique devised by people like the Kuwarra who had half-caste children in their family camps was to rub the offspring with charcoal ash (Note: This was not just a Kuwarra trick but a general practice among tribes subject to child-kidnapèping by white authorities. The Wardaman Bill Yidumduma Harney recounted how, after his sister Dulcie was stolen by 'welfare' officials, his mother kept rubbing him with charcoal and colouring his hair with blackcurrant plum juice) from burnt sandalwood, to make them pass as of pure tribal descent. At times, if a pastoralist vouchsafed that they worked on his property, they could escape the meshes of the round-up law. Such forced removals persisted down to the late 1970s.

Those who managed to find employment on pastoral stations were often taken on as indentured labourers and were paid a pittance. A law was passed forbidding any white, other than station owners, to approach groups of Aboriginals at a distance under five chains(100 metres. To escape bondage under such conditions, some endeavoured, when WW2 broke out, to enlist in the army, but pastoralists could overturn this by arguing they were needed on the property. Their nomadic movements were drastically disrupted, again, when a 1940 law ruled that no native person could cross over below the 20th parallel of latitude unless he could obtain a signed medical certificate and written permission from the government minister.

Kuwarra could, like other Westralian Aboriginals, obtain citizenship according to a law passed in 1944, which was on the books until its repeal in 1971. However, obtaining such citizenship carried with it a provision, that the new 'Australian' ex-Aboriginal person solemnly undertake to no longer associate with Aboriginals, with the sole exception of members of their immediate families.

== Alternative names ==
- Go:ara, Goara
- Guwara
- Konindja (exonym used by eastern tribes)
- Konindjara (Note: 'They eschewed terms—Konindjara applied by people to the east, and Waula, which merely means “those of the north,” applied to them by southern neighbours. In western Wadjari parlance konin means “poor fellow” and has a likely implication that the persons so spoken of were ones seeking refuge from some place in dry country. Among the Pintubi, who speak one of the Western Desert dialects related to the widespread Pitjandjara language (sometimes called Aluritja languages), the term koara as a meaning of “friendly” and may be used in a general sense for people of other tribes with whom they are at ease. Thus at the time this note was made in the mid-1930s, the Pitjandjara who lived south of the Koara, beyond the Lake Amadeus region in the Petermann Ranges, whom they knew as Partutu, were a Koara people. Their name for them evidently was also a generalized one since in Western Desert languages dry saltlake areas are called partutu, sometimes contracted to po:ti.)
- Waula ("northerners" for the Waljen)

== Sources ==
- "AIATSIS map of Indigenous Australia". AIATSIS. 14 May 2024.
- "Tindale Tribal Boundaries" (PDF). Department of Aboriginal Affairs, Western Australia. September 2016.
- "Koara native title claim WC95/1: current land tenure" ([cartographic material]) (Provisional draft, claimed interests ed.). Midland, W.A.: WALIS Land Claims Mapping Unit. 1996 – via Trove.
- Liberman, Kenneth (Spring 1980). "The Decline of the Kuwarra People of Australia's Western Desert: A Case Study of Legally Secured Domination". Ethnohistory. 27 (2): 119–133. doi:10.2307/481223. JSTOR 481223.
- Probyn-Rapsey, Fiona (2013). Made to Matter: White Fathers, Stolen Generations. Sydney University Press. ISBN 978-1-920-89997-4.
- Tindale, Norman Barnett (1974). "Koara (WA)". Aboriginal Tribes of Australia: Their Terrain, Environmental Controls, Distribution, Limits, and Proper Names. Australian National University Press. ISBN 978-0-708-10741-6. Archived from the original on 20 March 2020.
