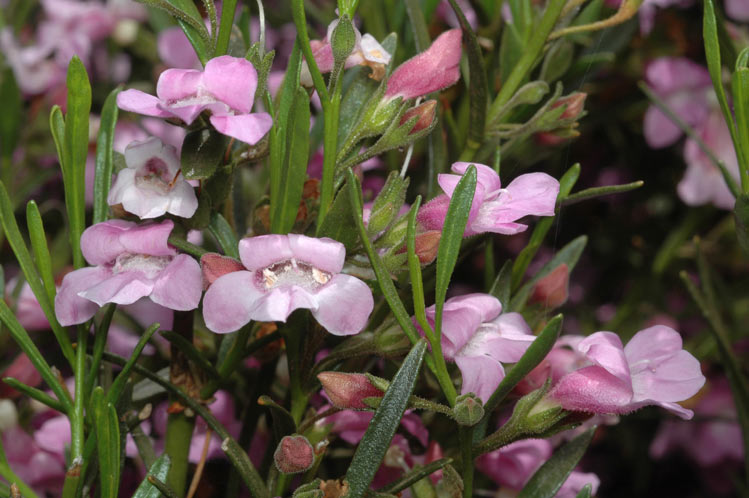

Conservation status
- Priority Three — Poorly Known Taxa (DEC)

Scientific classification
- Kingdom: Plantae
- Clade: Tracheophytes
- Clade: Angiosperms
- Clade: Eudicots
- Clade: Asterids
- Order: Lamiales
- Family: Scrophulariaceae
- Genus: Eremophila
- Species: E. campanulata

Binomial name
- Eremophila campanulata Chinnock

= Eremophila campanulata =

Bell-flowered poverty bush

Species of flowering plant

Eremophila campanulata, commonly known as bell-flowered poverty bush, is a flowering plant in the figwort family, Scrophulariaceae and is endemic to a small area in central Western Australia. It is a small, low, densely branched shrub with small leaves and purple or lilac flowers. Its most distinctive feature is the dark purple sepals at the base of the flowers.

== Description ==
Eremophila campanulata is a small shrub with a tangled branches growing to a height of about 0.4 m (1 ft) tall. The leaves are crowded near the ends of the branches and are mostly 3–10 mm (0.1–0.4 in) long and 1–2 mm (0.04–0.08 in) wide, linear to club-shaped with the edges turned under.

The flowers are borne singly in leaf axils on a stalk 4.5–8 mm (0.2–0.3 in) long. There are 5 dark purple, egg-shaped, pointed sepals which are 5.5–8 mm (0.2–0.3 in) long. The petals are 7–12 mm (0.3–0.5 in) long and joined at their lower end to form a bell-shaped tube. The tube is pale lilac-coloured to purple with three broad and two slightly narrower petal lobes on the end. The 4 stamens (sometimes 5 or 6 stamens) extend beyond the petal tube. Flowering mostly occurs from July to September and is followed by fruit which are dry, woody, oval to cone-shaped and 6.5–7.5 mm (0.26–0.30 in) long.

== Taxonomy and naming ==
The species was first formally described by Robert Chinnock in 2007 and the description was published in Eremophila and Allied Genera: A Monograph of the Plant Family Myoporaceae. The type specimen was collected by Chinnock about 39 kilometres (20 mi) east south east of Windidda. The specific epithet campanulata is a Latin word meaning bell-shaped, referring to the shape of the corolla.

== Distribution and habitat ==
Eremophila campanulata occurs between Prenti Downs and Wongawol in the Gascoyne biogeographic region where it grows in stony clay on low hills.

== Conservation ==
Eremophila campanulata is classified as "Priority Three" by the Western Australian Government Department of Parks and Wildlife meaning that it is poorly known and known from only a few locations but is not under imminent threat.
