= Waljen =

Aboriginal group in Western Australia

The Waljen are an indigenous people of Western Australia, in the Goldfields-Esperance area.

== Country ==
The Waljen lands in Norman Tindale's estimation covered roughly 6,000 square miles (16,000 km^{2}), taking in the area of Lake Raeside, and extending from Malcolm, Morgans, Laverton, and Burtville. Their southeastern boundary was around Edjudina Soaks. They were also present around Lake Lightfoot and at Lake Carey. Their eastern extension lay beyond Lake Minigwal. In the latter context, their traditional lore also speaks of an important site, not identified, called Winbalj.

== History ==
The Waljen seemed to have shifted southwestward towards the end of the 19th century, and by the 1890s they had reached the area south of Kalgoorlie.

== Alternative name ==
- Koara (Note: This is not to be confused with the Koara tribe. 'koara' was a general term meaning friendly people, i.e. latecomers who had shifted into an area.)
- Wonggai-juŋara ('aggressive men/usurpers'), an exonym used of them by the Maduwongga and Kalamaia

== Sources ==
- "AIATSIS map of Indigenous Australia". AIATSIS. 14 May 2024.
- "Tindale Tribal Boundaries" (PDF). Department of Aboriginal Affairs, Western Australia. September 2016. Archived from the original (PDF) on 8 March 2016.
- Tindale, Norman Barnett (1974). "Waljen (WA)". Aboriginal Tribes of Australia: Their Terrain, Environmental Controls, Distribution, Limits, and Proper Names. Australian National University Press. ISBN 978-0-708-10741-6. Archived from the original on 20 March 2020.
