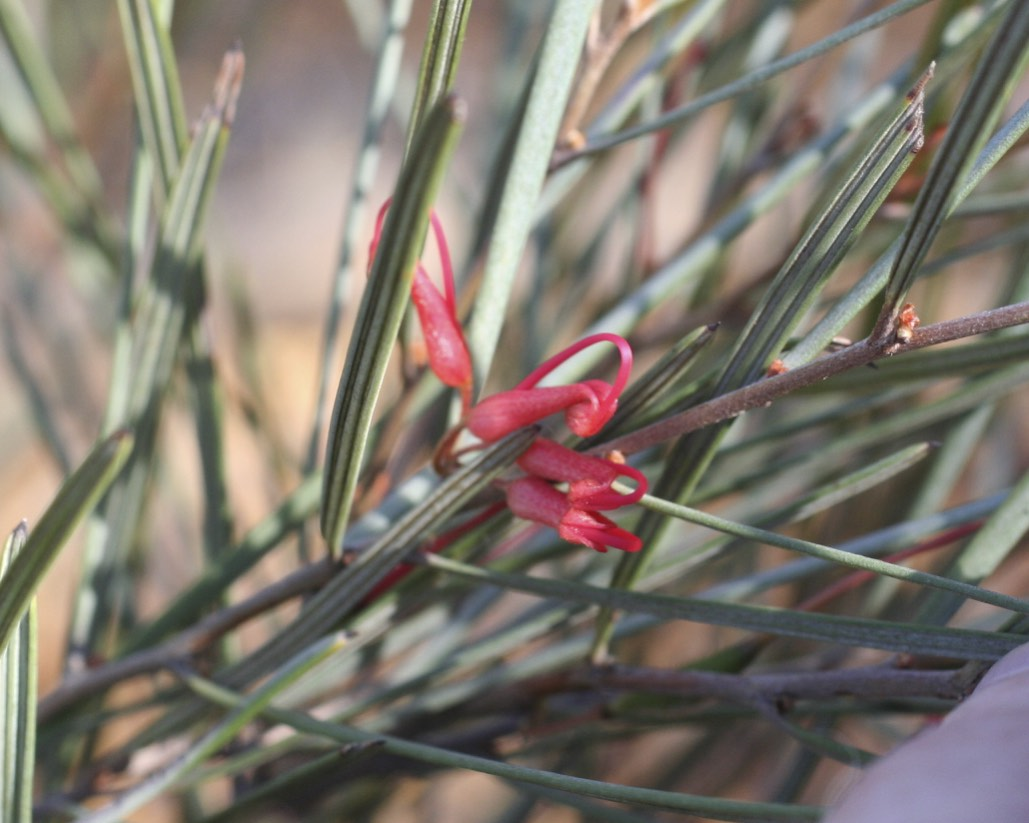
- Near Pindar

Conservation status
- Least Concern (IUCN 3.1)

Scientific classification
- Kingdom: Plantae
- Clade: Embryophytes
- Clade: Tracheophytes
- Clade: Spermatophytes
- Clade: Angiosperms
- Clade: Eudicots
- Order: Proteales
- Family: Proteaceae
- Genus: Grevillea
- Species: G. extorris

Binomial name
- Grevillea extorris S.Moore

= Grevillea extorris =

Species of shrub endemic to Western Australia

Grevillea extorris is a species of flowering plant in the family Proteaceae and is endemic to the west of Western Australia. It is an erect shrub with linear or narrowly oblong leaves and clusters of pink to red or yellow flowers.

== Description ==
Grevillea extorris is an erect shrub that typically grows to a height of 1–2.5 m (3 ft 3 in – 8 ft 2 in). Its leaves are linear to narrowly oblong, 40–120 mm (1.6–4.7 in) long and 1–3 mm (0.039–0.118 in) wide. The edges of the leaves are turned down or rolled under, the upper surface of the leaves silky-hairy at first, later glabrous, the lower surface silky-hairy or obscured. The flowers are arranged on the stems or in leaf axils in clusters of three to twelve flowers on a rachis 0.5–4 mm (0.020–0.157 in) long. The flowers are pink to red or yellow, the pistil 28–38 mm (1.1–1.5 in) long. Flowering occurs from April to September and the fruit is an oval follicle 11–15 mm (0.43–0.59 in) long.

== Taxonomy ==
Grevillea extorris was first formally described in 1889 by Spencer Le Marchant Moore in the Journal of the Linnean Society, Botany. The specific epithet (extorris) means "banished", referring to the inhospitable places in which this species grows.

== Distribution and habitat ==
This grevillea grows in low woodland or shrubland, near creeks and on rocky slopes from near Mullewa to Lake Darlot and from Cue to Mount Jackson in the Avon Wheatbelt, Coolgardie, Great Victoria Desert, Murchison and Yalgoo biogeographic regions of western Western Australia.

== Conservation status ==
Grevillea exposita is listed as least concern on the IUCN Red List of Threatened Species and as not threatened by the Government of Western Australia Department of Biodiversity, Conservation and Attractions.

This grevillea is widely distributed, common and has a stable overall population. There are no major threats to the species identified at present or in the near future.

== See also ==
- List of Grevillea species
