= Pindiini =

Aboriginal people of Western Australia

The Pindiini, also spelt Bindinini, are an Aboriginal Australian people of Western Australia.

== Name ==
The Pitjantjatjara referred to the Pindiini as Wonggai, a term that implies they were given to thievery, wonggai being a word used to indicate mice pilfering flour. The Pindiini began to object to this Pitjantjatjara exonym several years later, and asserted that they were to be known by their endonym, Pindiini.

== Country ==
The Pindiini's territory lay north of the Nullarbor Plain, as far north as Loonngana. Norman Tindale states that their territory covered some 11,500 square miles (30,000 km^{2}).

Their neighbouring tribes, running clockwise from due north, were the Nakako, the Ngalia due east, the Mirning due south, between them and the Great Australian Bight, the Murunitja southeast, followed by the Nangatadjara and the Mandjindja to their northwest.

== Alternative names ==
- Bindinini
- Bindunda
- Wonggai
- Wongaidya
- Wongaii, Wonkai
- Wanggada, Wanggaji

== History of contact ==
Rumours of a tribe by the name Pindiini first emerged in 1934 at Ooldea in 1934, when a majority of the tribe moved to that location. In later decades, together with the Ngalea, they settled in Yalata.

== Sources ==
- "AIATSIS map of Indigenous Australia". AIATSIS. 14 May 2024.
- "Tindale Tribal Boundaries" (PDF). Department of Aboriginal Affairs, Western Australia. September 2016. Archived from the original (PDF) on 8 March 2016.
- Tindale, Norman Barnett (1974). "Pindiini (WA)". Aboriginal Tribes of Australia: Their Terrain, Environmental Controls, Distribution, Limits, and Proper Names. Australian National University Press. ISBN 978-0-708-10741-6. Archived from the original on 20 March 2020.
