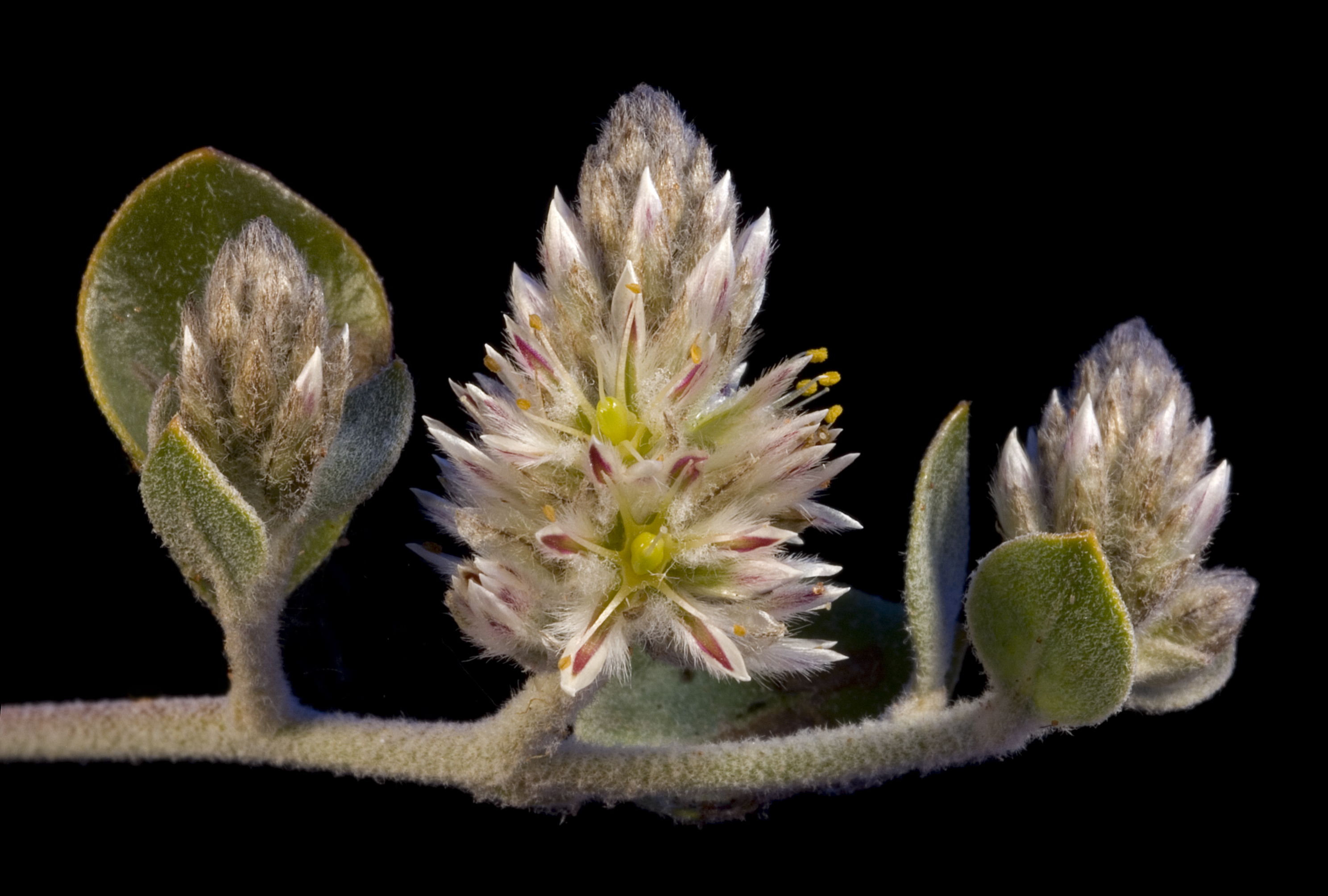

Scientific classification
- Kingdom: Plantae
- Clade: Embryophytes
- Clade: Tracheophytes
- Clade: Spermatophytes
- Clade: Angiosperms
- Clade: Eudicots
- Order: Caryophyllales
- Family: Amaranthaceae
- Genus: Ptilotus
- Species: P. roei

Binomial name
- Ptilotus roei (F.Muell. ex Benth.) F.Muell.

Synonyms
- Ptilotus sewelliae F.Muell. nom. inval., nom. nud.; Trichinium roei F.Muell. ex Benth.; Trichinium sewelliae (F.Muell.) C.A.Gardner nom. inval.

= Ptilotus roei =

Species of herb

Ptilotus roei, is a species of flowering plant of the family Amaranthaceae and is endemic to northern inland Western Australia. It is a prostrate to low-lying perennial herb with hairy leaves at the base of the plant and on the stems, and white or brown spikes of flowers.

== Description ==
Ptilotus roei is a prostrate to low-lying perennial herb that typically grows to 70 cm (28 in) wide. The rosette of leaves at the base of the plant and stem leaves are 6–50 mm (0.24–1.97 in) long and 4–35 mm (0.16–1.38 in) wide and with star-shaped hairs at first. The flowers are densely arranged in white or brown, oval or cylindrical spikes on the ends of branches, the bracts 2.3–3.2 mm (0.091–0.126 in) long and bracteoles 3.2–4.2 mm (0.13–0.17 in) long. The outer tepals are 4.9–6.5 mm (0.19–0.26 in) long and the inner tepals 4.7–6.3 mm (0.19–0.25 in) long. The style is straight, 2.0–2.3 mm (0.079–0.091 in) long and centrally fixed to the ovary.

== Taxonomy ==
This species was first formally described in 1870 by George Bentham who gave it the name Trichinium roei in his Flora Australiensis from an unpublished description by Ferdinand von Mueller of specimens collected near Lake Barlee during an exploration by John Forrest. In 1868, von Mueller transferred the species to Ptilotus as P. roei in his Systematic Census of Australian Plants. The specific epithet (roei) honours John Septimus Roe.

== Distribution and habitat ==
This species of Ptilotus has a wide distribution in the Gascoyne, Little Sandy Desert, Murchison, Pilbara and Yalgoo bioregions of northern inland Western Australia.

== Conservation status ==
Ptilotus roei is listed as "not threatened" by the Government of Western Australia Department of Biodiversity, Conservation and Attractions.

== Gallery ==
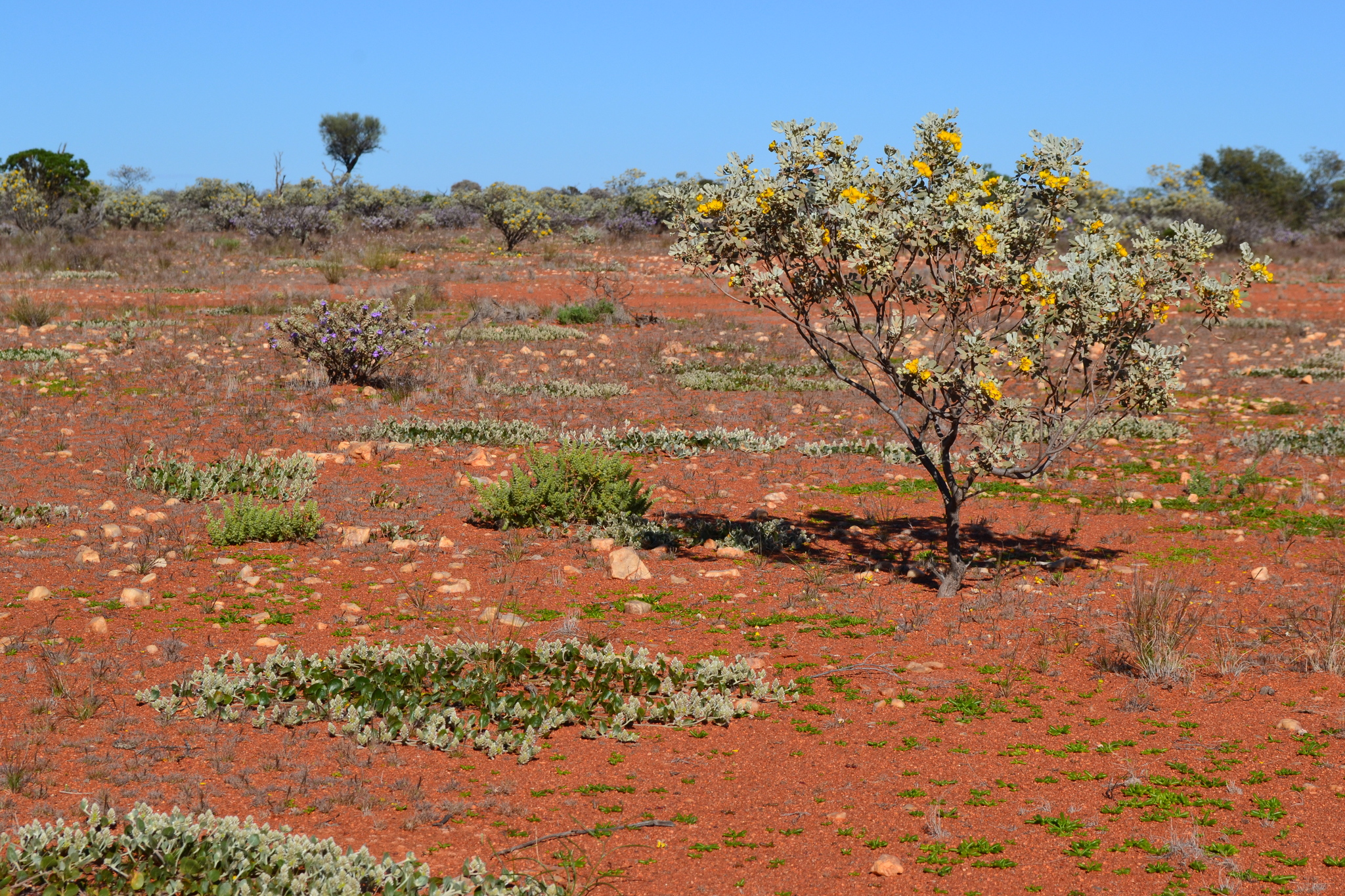
Ptilotus roei habit

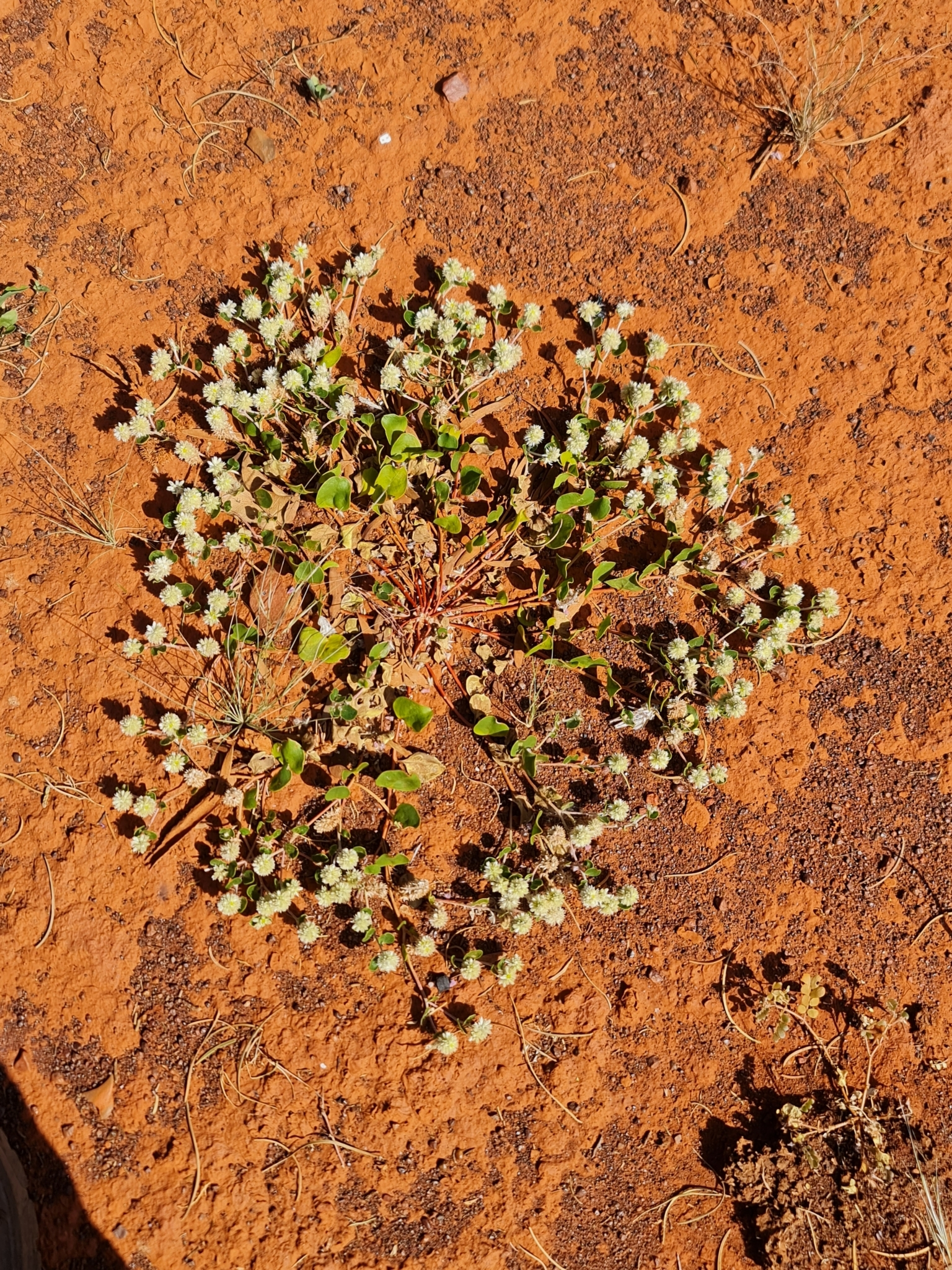

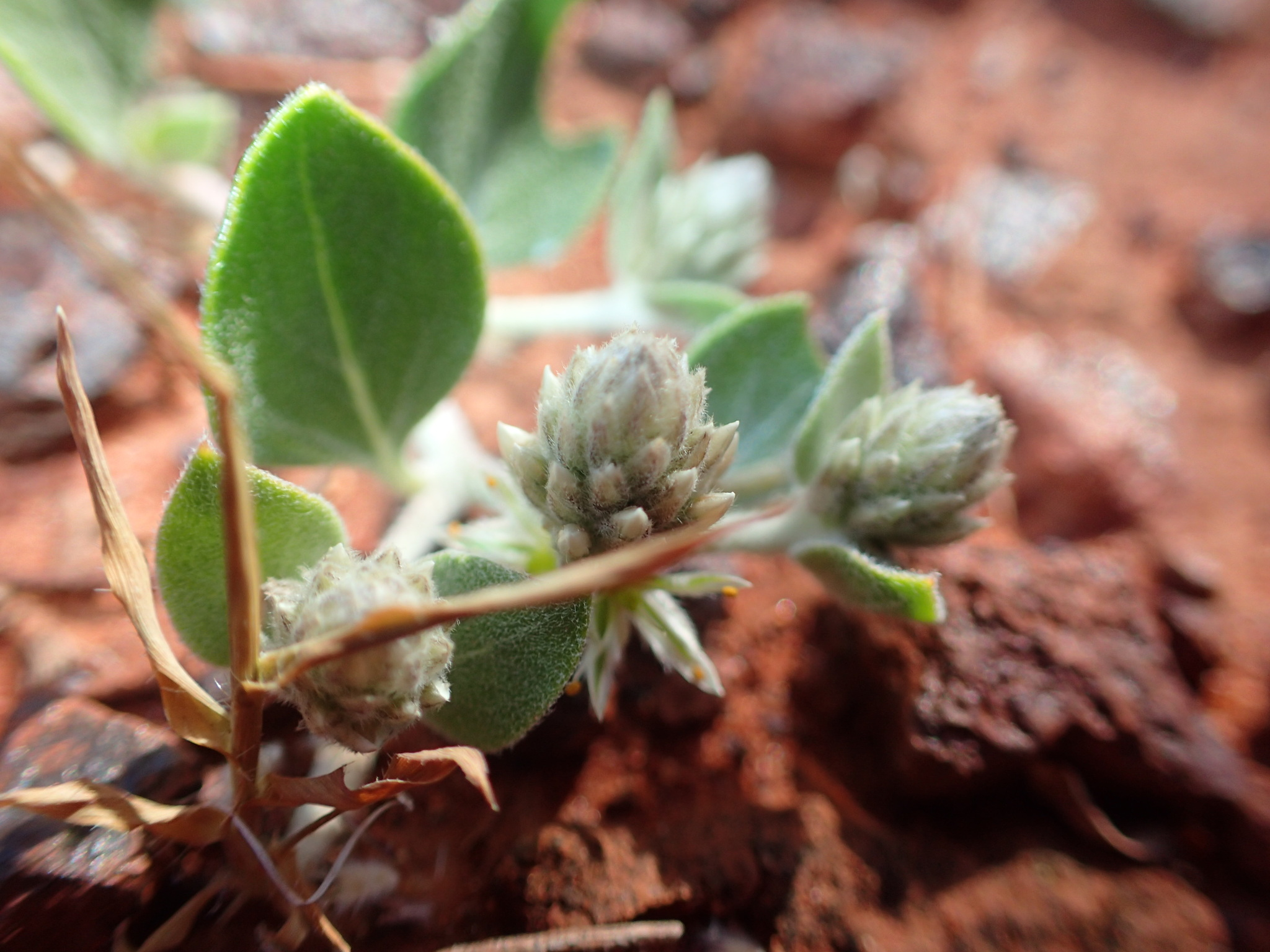
