= Deadly Awards 2009 =

Australian Aboriginal and Torres Strait Islander annual music awards

Winners of The Deadlys Awards 2009. The award was an annual celebration of Australian Aboriginal and Torres Strait Islander achievement in music, sport, entertainment and community.

== Music ==
- Most Promising New Talent in Music: Yabu Band
- Single Release of the Year: Burn - Jessica Mauboy
- Album Release off the Year: Been Waiting - Jessica Mauboy
- Band of the Year: Saltwater Band
- Male Artist of the Year: Gurrumul Yunupingu
- Female Artist of the Year: Jessica Mauboy
- Outstanding Achievement in RNB and Hip Hop: The Last Kinection
- Jimmy Little Lifetime Achievement Award for Contribution to Aboriginal and Torres Strait Islander Music: Seaman Dan
- APRA Song of the Year: Running Back - Jessica Mauboy, Sean Mullins and Audius Mtawarira

== Sport ==
- Most Promising New Talent in Sport: Jamal Idris
- Outstanding Achievement in AFL: Michael O'Loughlin
- Outstanding Achievement in Rugby League: Johnathan Thurston
- Male Sportsperson of the Year: Michael O'Loughlin
- Female Sportsperson of the Year: Rohanee Cox
- The Ella Lifetime Achievement Award for Contribution to Aboriginal and Torres Strait Islander Sport: Danny Morseau

== The arts ==
- Dancer of the Year: B-Boy 2 Ezy
- Outstanding Achievement in Film: Samson and Delilah - Warwick Thornton
- Outstanding Achievement in TV: Message Stick - ABC
- Achievement in Theatre or Live Performance: Stephen Page - Bangarra
- Outstanding Achievement in Literature: Lorraine McGee-Sippell
- Male Actor of the Year: Luke Carroll
- Female Actor of the Year: Leah Purcell
- Visual Artist of the Year: Destiny Deacon

== Community ==
- Outstanding Achievement in Education: May O'Brien
- Outstanding Achievement in Health: Chicka Dixon
- Broadcaster of the Year: Marlene Cummins
- Contribution to Employment: Traditional Credit Union
