= Claremont Teachers College =

First post-secondary teaching institution in Western Australia

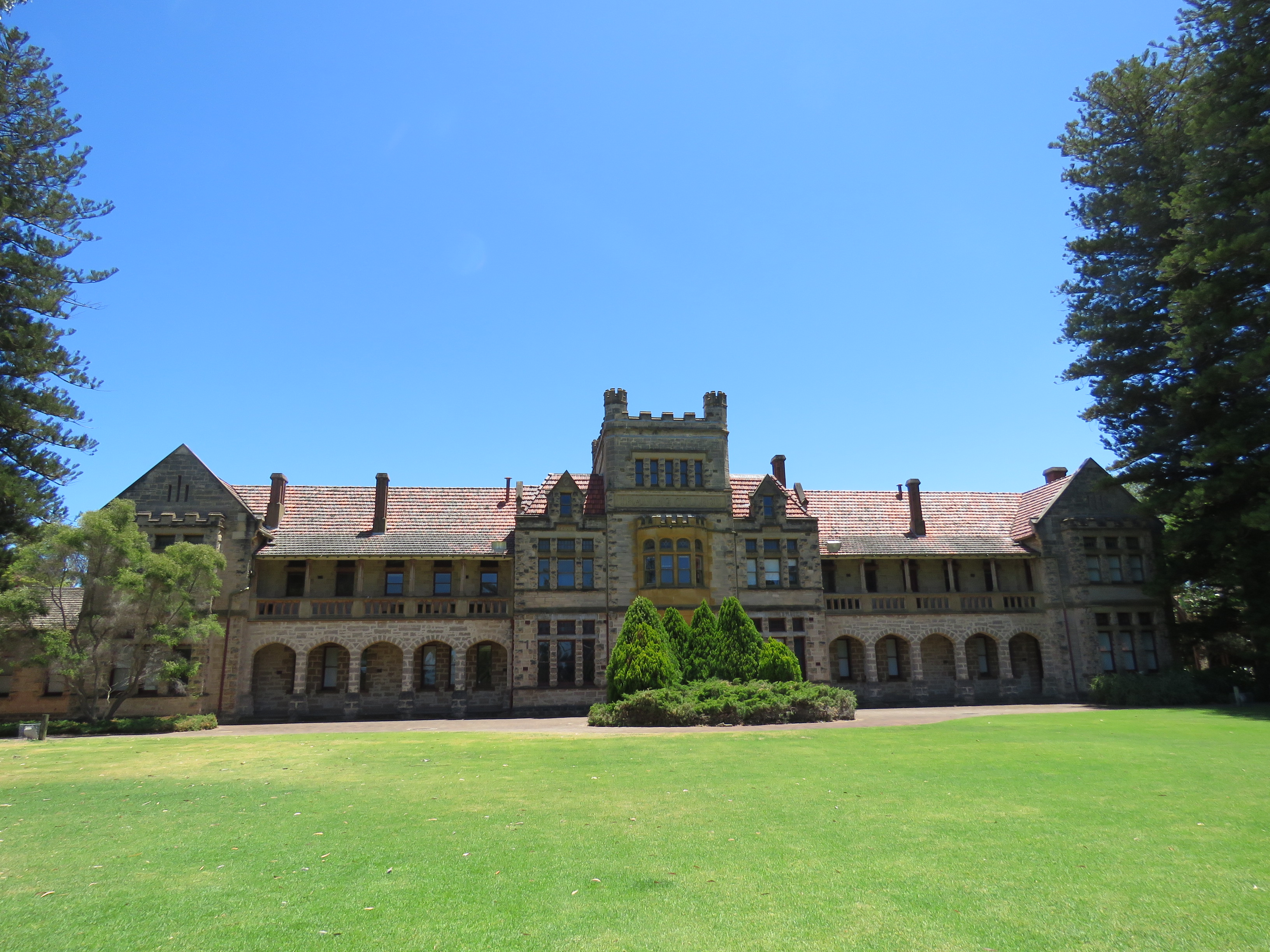
- The Claremont Teachers College in December 2021
- Interactive map of the Claremont Teachers College area

General information
- Type: Heritage-listed building
- Location: Claremont, Western Australia
- Coordinates: 31°59′14″S 115°47′17″E

Western Australia Heritage Register
- Type: State Registered Place
- Designated: 6 March 1992
- Reference no.: 482

Claremont Teachers College was Western Australia's first post-secondary teaching institution. It opened in 1902 and closed in 1981, when it became a College of Advanced Education then a campus of Edith Cowan University before being acquired by the University of Western Australia. The building is on land between Goldsworthy, Princess and Bay Roads in the western Perth, Western Australia suburb of Claremont. It is a large two storey limestone building set in extensive grounds, with a distinctive square crenellated tower, and was entered in the Register of the National Estate in 1987.

== Background ==
In 1847 the General Board of Education was established to oversee school development in the Swan River Colony. After becoming the Central Board of Education, it was superseded by the Education Department in 1893, which classified schools, graded teachers, defined teachers' positions, implemented a salary scale for teachers, abolished school fees, provided for co-educational schools, and made attendance compulsory for children between the ages of six and 14. At this time, the Education Department had "external study" for student teachers, where they taught in the classroom while studying for examinations set by the department.

In 1902, the college was opened and students could gain qualifications through studying there. It was the only place one could do this until the 1950s when the Churchlands and Graylands colleges opened. The function of teacher education did not pass into the university sector until the 1980s.

The college's last Director was Thomas Ryan (1924–2002), who completed his teacher training at the college and graduated in 1947. He was appointed Vice-Principal of the college in 1972, a position he held until his appointment as director of the college in 1980.

The campus was the Claremont campus of Edith Cowan University following that institution's formation in 1989. Upon acquisition of the campus by the University of Western Australia in 2004, the campus became home to the Confucius Institute, University of Western Australia Press and, until 2021, Taylors College.

== Notable graduates ==
- Kim Beazley senior, Labor politician
- Harry Butler, naturalist
- Nugget Coombs, economist and public servant
- Rica Erickson, historian and author
- Rolf Harris, artist/musician
- May Lorna O'Brien, Aboriginal educator and author
- Noel Robins, sailor
- Arthur Tonkin, Labor politician
- John Tonkin, Labor politician
