= Gloria Brennan =

Australian Aboriginal community leader (1948–1985)

Gloria Faye Brennan (12 September 1948 – 2 November 1985) was an Aboriginal community leader and public servant from Western Australia, of Pindiini (Nyanganyatjara) descent.

Brennan advocated on a number of issues, including: Aboriginal land rights, welfare for women and children, Aboriginal education and health, the need for interpreter services, and nuclear energy. She worked for the Department of Aboriginal Affairs, at both a state and federal level.

== Early years ==
Gloria Brennan was born in Leonora, Western Australia, on 12 September 1948. She was the second child of Western Australian parents, James Brennan, a woodcutter, and Myrtle Brennan (née Goodilyer). As a child she learned to speak the Wudjari language fluently. She attended primary schools in Gwalia (they lived in the house next to the school), Laverton, and Menzies. Along with her siblings, she spent holidays with her maternal grandmothers, learning about her Aboriginal culture and heritage. She attended high school in Kalgoorlie and Perth.

== Education ==
In 1971, Brennan enrolled at the University of Western Australia, in the Faculty of Arts, as a mature age student. She majored in anthropology, and also studied linguistics, English, history and music. She graduated with a Bachelor of Arts in 1978. Brennan was one of the first Aboriginal women to graduate from the University of Western Australia.

== Community work ==
Brennan was a member of the Aboriginal Advancement Council of Western Australia, the New Era Aboriginal Fellowship, the Aboriginal Women's Council, and the Black Australian Women's Movement.

In the 1970s, she was instrumental in the founding of the Aboriginal Medical Service in Western Australia.

== Employment ==
Gloria worked in the programming department of the Australian Broadcasting Commission (ABC) 1966-1971 when it was located in Adelaide Terrace. Brennan worked as a casual field officer for the Aboriginal Legal Service of Western Australia, an organisation she helped to set up in 1973. While there she was involved in the Domestic Violence task force and from 1974 to 1975, she worked as an interpreter with the legal team investigating allegations of police brutality at Skull Creek, near Laverton.

== Legacy ==
The Gloria Brennan Scholarship, which assists Aboriginal and Torres Strait Islander students attending public universities in Western Australia, is named after her. As was the Gloria Brennan Aboriginal and Torres Strait Islander Women's Centre, which was established in East Perth in 1988.
