= Lake Barlee =

Intermittent lake in Western Australia

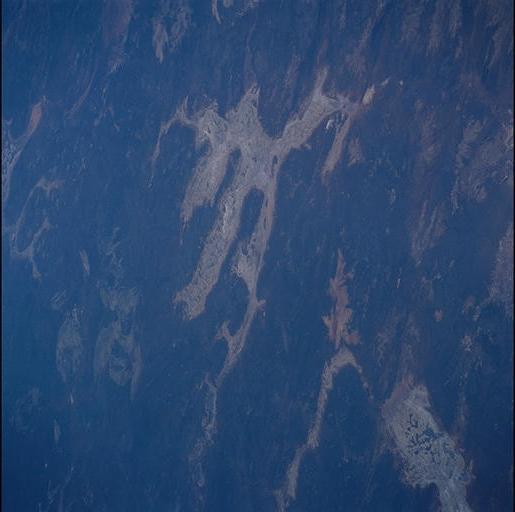
- Satellite image

- Location in Western Australia
- Interactive map of Lake Barlee
- Location: Western Australia
- Coordinates: 29°9′20″S 119°30′50″E
- Lake type: Intermittent salt lake
- Primary outflows: evaporation
- Catchment area: 17,900 km^{2} (6,900 sq mi)
- Basin countries: Australia
- Max. length: 80 km (50 mi)
- Max. width: 100 km (62 mi)
- Surface area: 1,980 km^{2} (760 sq mi)

Lake Barlee is an intermittent salt lake. With a surface area of 1,980 square kilometres (764 sq mi), it is the second largest lake in Western Australia.

== Description ==
Lake Barlee is situated on the Yilgarn block 65 kilometres (40 mi) southeast of Youanmi and 160 kilometres (99 mi) north of Bullfinch, on the border between the shires of Sandstone and Menzies. It is more than 100 kilometres (62 mi) from west to east, and about 80 kilometres (50 mi) from north to south.

Lake Barlee and other lakes in the area are cenozoic palaeovalleys, fed predominantly by groundwater flowing through ancient palaeochannels. The channels are filled with calcretes and alluvial clay-quartz units.

Like most of the clay playas in the area, it is usually dry but can fill when tropical cyclones become rain-bearing depressions after they cross the coast. It fills about once every ten years on average, after which the water usually persists for another six to nine months. When it is inundated, it becomes an important breeding site for waterbirds.

Lake Barlee receives water from direct rainfall and inflow from a multitude of creeks. The bed of the lake is bare, with hundreds of greenstone rock islands of varying sizes. These islands, typically with heights less than 10 m (33 ft), support samphire vegetation. When the lake is nearly full or overflowing, at least five of the islands may support large numbers of breeding birds, particularly the banded stilt.

== History ==
The traditional owners of the area are the Mantjintjarra Ngalia peoples, whose range extended from around Lake Wells in the east, to Lake Darlot and Lake Miranda in the west, to Cosmo Newberry through to Leonora and Lake Barlee up to Wiluna in the north.

Lake Barlee was named by John Forrest, who encountered it on 18 May 1869. Forrest's party, which was searching for the lost explorer Ludwig Leichhardt, became bogged while trying to cross the salt lake. After extracting their horses, they skirted the lake for nearly a week. On 25 May, Forrest climbed Yeedie Hill and saw the extent of the lake. Forrest named the lake after Frederick Barlee, the Colonial Secretary of Western Australia.

== Birds ==
Lake Barlee, along with some small satellite lakes, was identified by BirdLife International as a 1,937-square-kilometre (748 sq mi) Important Bird Area (IBA). It supported one of the largest recorded breeding events of the banded stilt, with 179,000 nests counted. Other waterbirds known to breed at the lake include the black swan, Australian shelduck, pink-eared duck, white-headed stilt, and red-capped plover.

== Gallery ==
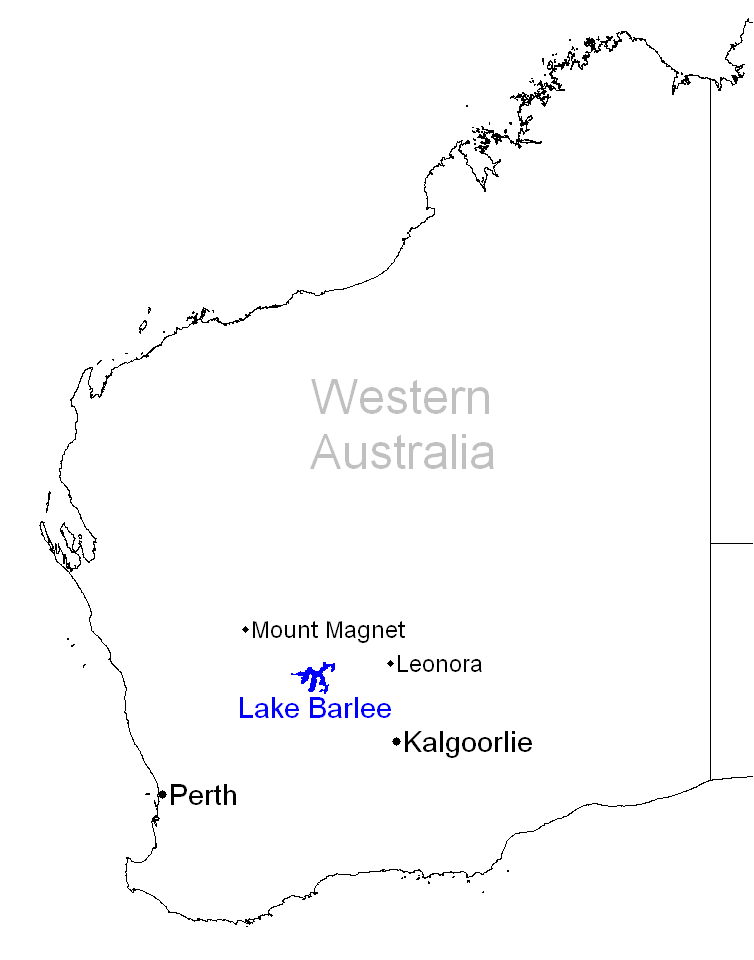

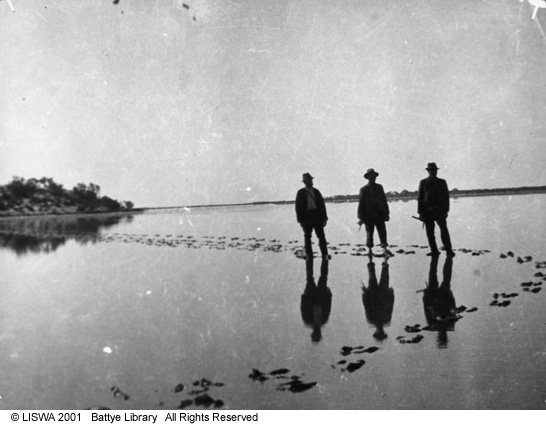
Prospectors crossing Lake Barlee, c. 1923

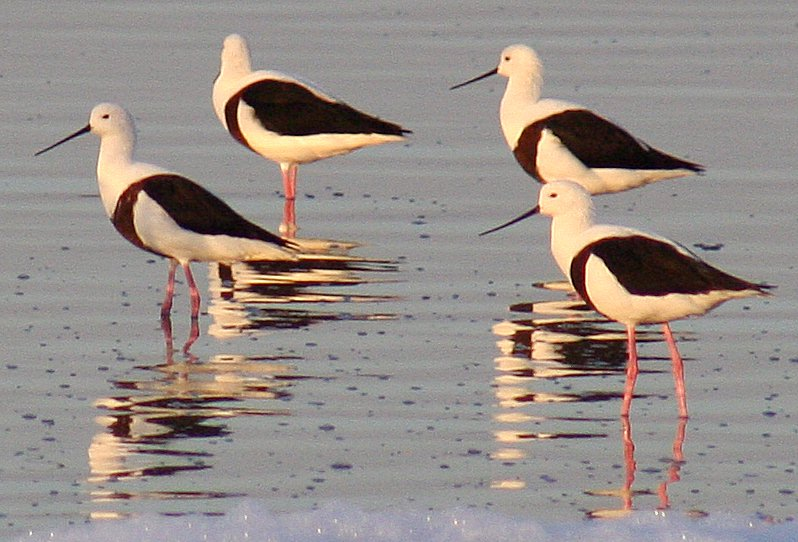
Banded stilts

== See also ==
- List of lakes of Australia § Western Australia
