= Lake Ballard =

Lake in Western Australia

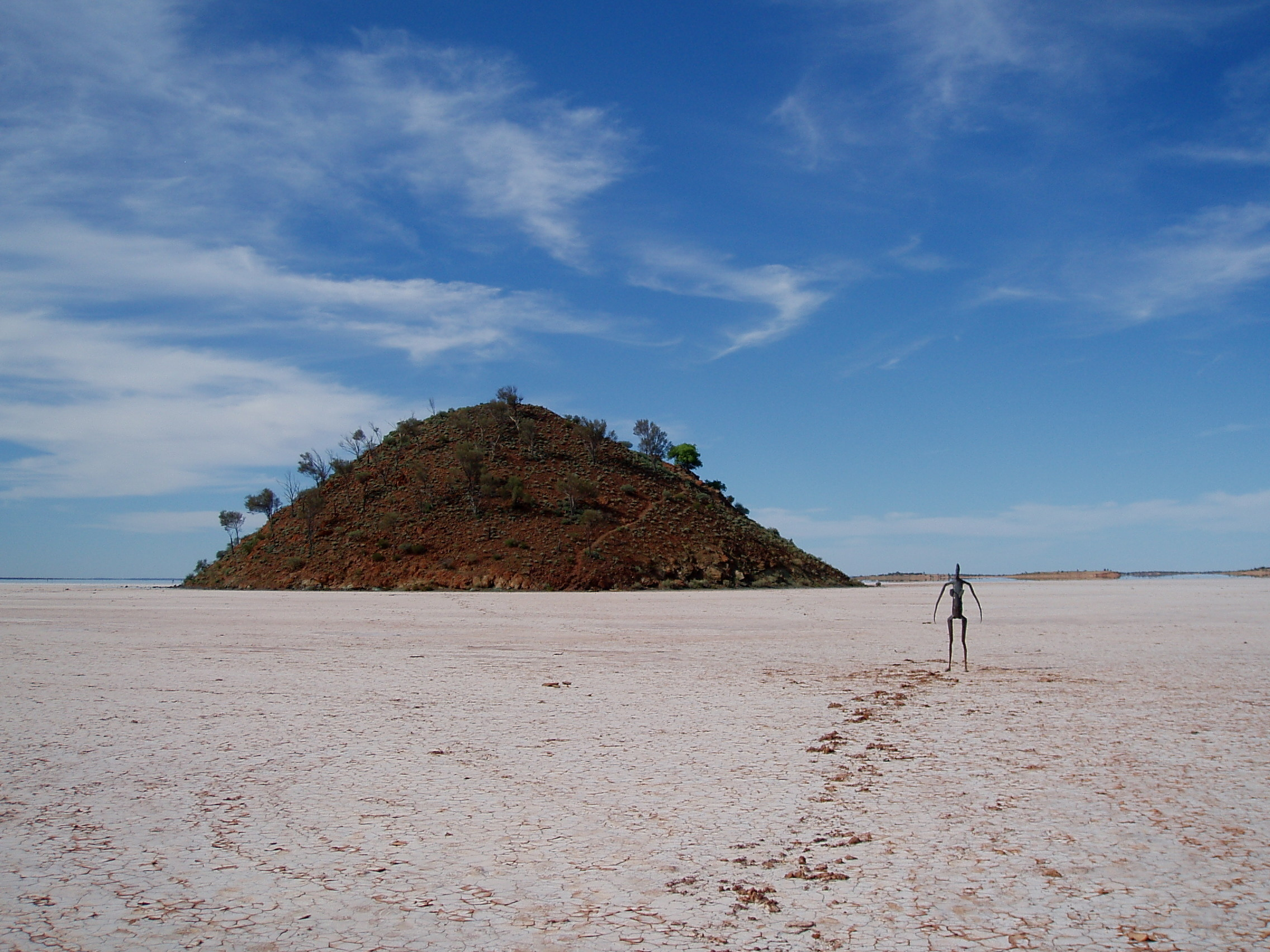
- Lake Ballard

- Location in Western Australia
- Interactive map of Lake Ballard
- Location: Goldfields-Esperance, Western Australia
- Coordinates: 29°25′33″S 120°45′07″E
- Type: Salt lake
- Basin countries: Australia
- Max. length: 50 km (31 mi)
- Max. width: 20 km (12 mi)
- Surface area: 4,900 ha (12,108 acres)

Lake Ballard is an ephemeral salt lake in the Shire of Menzies, Goldfields-Esperance area of Western Australia, with its eastern end about 18 kilometres (11 mi) north of Menzies.

== Sculptures ==
In 2003, to commemorate the 50th anniversary of the Perth International Arts Festival the Inside Australia exhibition was commissioned. The artist and Turner Prize winner Antony Gormley installed 51 metal sculptures over an area of 10 square kilometres (4 sq mi) on the bed of the lake. Each sculpture represented a local resident of Menzies, derived from the laser scans of the town's residents. The statues were to be removed at the conclusion of the festival but remain as a tourist exhibition. It is the largest outdoor art gallery on earth.

== Banded stilts ==
The lake is used as a breeding site for banded stilts following major flood events. The stilts nest in large close-packed colonies on low islands in ephemeral inland salt lakes such as Lake Eyre, Lake Barlee and Lake Ballard. The last recorded nesting on the lake was in 1995 following the aftermath of Cyclone Bobby. The lake, along with the neighbouring Lake Marmion some 20 kilometres (12 mi) to the east, has been identified by BirdLife International as a 984-square-kilometre (380 sq mi) Important Bird Area, because it has supported a high proportion of the known banded stilt mass breeding events.

== See also ==
- List of lakes of Australia § Western Australia
