= Lake Carey =

Lake in Western Australia

- Location in Western Australia
- Interactive map of Lake Carey
- Location: Goldfields-Esperance, Western Australia
- Coordinates: 29°06′00″S 122°19′38″E
- Type: Salt lake
- Primary outflows: Lake Minigwal
- Catchment area: 6,000 square kilometres (2,300 sq mi)
- Basin countries: Australia

Lake Carey is a salt lake in the Goldfields-Esperance region of Western Australia. It was named in 1869 by surveyor John Forrest in company with Tommy Windich, after Thomas Campbell Carey, the government surveyor to whom Forrest had been apprenticed in 1863.

Lake Carey is one of a chain of lakes that makes up the Carey Palaeodrainage system, formed during the Tertiary Period, from about 65 million years ago. The Carey Palaeodrainage system extends about 600 kilometres (373 mi) from Wiluna to the Eucla Basin.

The elongated lake extends from 25 kilometres (16 mi) to 90 kilometres (56 mi) south of Laverton, within the Laverton Tectonic Zone, an area associated with gold mining since the 1890s.

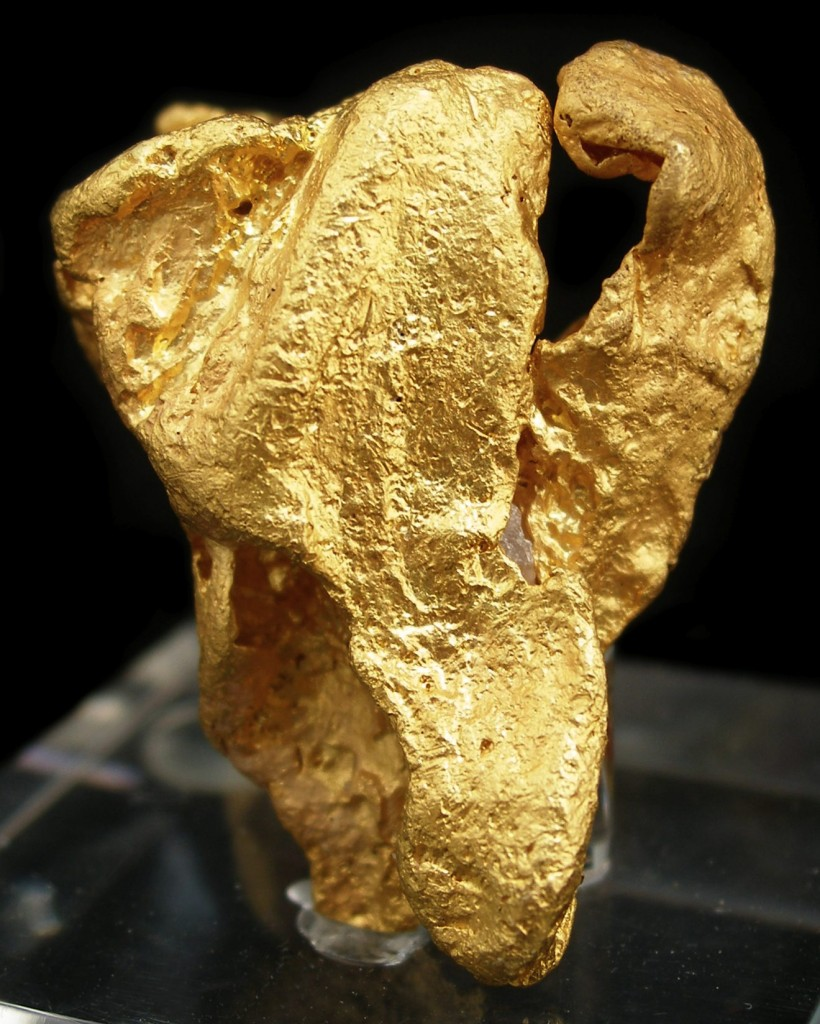
Gold specimen from Lake Carey area, 77 grams (2.5 ozt)

Mining activity and its discharge has affected the lake.

The Wangkathaa people are associated with the land around Lake Carey.

== See also ==
- List of lakes of Australia § Western Australia
