= May Lorna O'Brien =

Australian educator and author (1932-2020)

May Lorna O'Brien BEM
- Born: May Lorna Miller; 20 May 1932; Laverton, Western Australia
- Died: 1 March 2020 (aged 87)
- Education: Claremont Teachers College
- Occupations: Educator, author

May Lorna O'Brien BEM (20 May 1932 – 1 March 2020) was an Australian educator and author.

== Life and career ==
Born May Lorna Miller of the Wongatha people, in Laverton, Western Australia, at the age of five she was removed to the Mount Margaret Aboriginal Mission. She later attended Perth Girls School.

In 1953, she received her Teacher's Certificate at Claremont Teachers College. She was the first known Aboriginal woman in Western Australia to graduate from a tertiary institution. Her first teaching appointment was back at Mount Margaret.

After teaching for 25 years she moved into education policy, working for the Western Australian Ministry of Education and the Aboriginal Education Branch. She retired from her position as Superintendent of Aboriginal Education in 1988.

In retirement, O'Brien continued to work for Indigenous literacy and education writing bilingual books, and was one of the early ambassadors for the Indigenous Literacy Foundation.

She died aged 87 on 1 March 2020 in Perth. Her public funeral and memorial service was postponed due to the coronavirus outbreak.

== Awards ==
She was awarded the British Empire Medal on 31 December 1977 for work in Aboriginal education. For this she was also awarded the John Curtin Medal. She was a delegate for Australia at the United Nations Conference on Women in Denmark in 1980. In 1984 she was awarded a Churchill Fellowship to study programs focused on enabling Indigenous peoples to retain their own cultures, travelling to the USA, Canada and Great Britain. In 2008, O'Brien was featured in the Australian Biography series.

== Publications ==
O'Brien's papers are held at the State Library of Western Australia in a collection titled: Aborigines of the west: their past and their present, and a May O'Brien Special Collection on Aboriginal studies is held at Edith Cowan University Library.

Her publications include:

- Education for Aborigines (co-author), Aboriginal Consultative Group to the Australian Schools Commission, 1976
- Aboriginal Access to and use of Technical and Further Education, 1976
- The Badudu series of children's books
- The Bawoo series of traditional teaching stories in bi-lingual text

== Sources ==
- Byrski, Liz. May O'Brien: 'Heart and soul', in Speaking Out: Australian women talk about success, Frenchs Forest: New South Wales, 1999, pp. 215–227
- Encyclopaedia of Aboriginal Australia: Some Aboriginal Women Pathfinders, WCTU:1980
