= Taylors College =

Education provider in Australia and New Zealand

- Sydney and Auckland, New South Wales, Western Australia, Australia, New Zealand

Information
- Type: Independent school
- Established: 1920
- Principal: Alan Moran (Sydney)
- Years offered: High School Year 10 to Year 12 and University Foundation programs
- Campus: Urban, Parks
- Affiliations: University of Sydney, University of Western Australia, University of Auckland, Auckland University of Technology, Massey University
- Website: www.taylorscollege.edu.au

Taylors College is a provider of university preparation programs in Australia and New Zealand. Established in Melbourne, Australia, in 1920, Taylors College is a private school that provides secondary school education (Year 10 to Year 12) and specialised University Foundation programs in partnership with universities in Australia and New Zealand. The college has campuses in Sydney and Auckland. It is a part of Study Group, a provider of private Higher Education, language and Careers Education.

== History ==
George Taylor and Staff (GT&S) was established in 1920. It was one of 13 colleges that offered tuition to students at the University of Melbourne.

Between 1920 and 1970, Taylors College enrolled about 320,000 students.

== Campuses ==
Taylors College campuses are located in Sydney and Auckland.

- Taylors College Sydney (33°54′09″S 151°12′27″E) is located in the eastern Sydney suburb of Waterloo and is close to the centre of Sydney.
- Taylors College Auckland (36°51′28″S 174°45′45″E) is located on Karangahapee Road in the heart of Auckland city.

Taylors College Perth (31°59′14″S 115°47′17″E) closed in 2021. It was based on the University of Western Australia’s campus.
