= Nangatadjara =

Aboriginal people from Western Australia

The Nangatadjara are an Aboriginal Australian people of Western Australia.

== Country ==
Nangatadjara lands encompassed, according to Tindale, approximately 23,000 square miles (60,000 km^{2}). Their north-northeastern extension touched the Bailey, Virginia and Newland Ranges. They roamed eastwards of Lake Carey and Burtville and around the Jubilee and Plumridge lake areas, and they were present around Lake Yeo, Rason and the Bartlett Soak.

== History of contact ==
The Nangatadjara are known to have shifted west to Burtville and Laverton in the last decade of the 19th century.

== Alternative names ==
- Nanggatha
- Nangandjara, Nganandjara
- Nangata
- Wangata
- Dituwonga
- Ditu
- Ngalapita
- Njingipalaru (Waljen exonym signifying "different talk")
- Alindjara ('east'(ern people))

== Sources ==
- "AIATSIS map of Indigenous Australia". AIATSIS. 14 May 2024.
- "Tindale Tribal Boundaries" (PDF). Department of Aboriginal Affairs, Western Australia. September 2016. Archived from the original (PDF) on 8 March 2016.
- Tindale, Norman Barnett (1974). "Nangatadjara (WA)". Aboriginal Tribes of Australia: Their Terrain, Environmental Controls, Distribution, Limits, and Proper Names. Australian National University Press. ISBN 978-0-708-10741-6. Archived from the original on 20 March 2020.
