= Lake Carnegie (Western Australia) =

Ephemeral lake in Western Australia

- Location in Western Australia
- Interactive map of Lake Carnegie
- Location: Goldfields-Esperance, Western Australia
- Coordinates: 26°10′S 122°30′E
- Type: Ephemeral
- Basin countries: Australia
- Max. length: 100 km (62 mi)
- Max. width: 30 km (19 mi)
- Surface area: 5,714 km^{2} (2,206 sq mi)
- Surface elevation: 439 m (1,440 ft)

Lake Carnegie is a large ephemeral lake in the Shire of Wiluna in the Goldfields-Esperance region of Western Australia. The lake is named after David Carnegie, who explored much of inland Western Australia in the 1890s. A similar lake lies to its south east - Lake Wells.

== Geography ==
Lake Carnegie is predominantly surrounded by desert environments. It lies east of Wiluna, at the southern edge of the Little Sandy Desert, and at the southwestern border of the Gibson Desert. It is northeast of Leonora and northwest of the Great Central Road and the Great Victoria Desert. Lake Carnegie is north of the main region of gold fields in Western Australia.

The lake is approximately 100 kilometres (62 mi) in length and approximately 30 kilometres (19 mi) at its widest part. It has a total area of approximately 5,714 square kilometres (2,206 sq mi), making it one of the largest lakes in Australia. The surface elevation is 439 m (1,440 ft) above mean sea-level.

Lake Carnegie fills with water only during very rare periods of significant rainfall, such as during the huge 1900 floods, and in numerous recent tropical wet seasons when climate change has moved the monsoon and tropical cyclones south. In dry years, it is reduced to a muddy marsh.

In 1973 Tropical Cyclone Kerry crossed the northwest coast and moved southwest as far as the northern gold fields. Over a four-day period, nearby pastoral leases such as Windidda Station received falls of 310 millimetres (12 in), while Prenti Downs received 209 millimetres (8 in). The runoff was enormous, causing widespread flooding, with the lake overflowing and leaving the area between Carnegie and Wiluna "one huge lake".

Water entering the lake, unlike in more easterly playas of the Australian arid zone, does not come from well-defined river channels. The soils of the region are so weathered – lacking tectonic or glacial activity since the Carboniferous ice ages – that sediment is completely absent; the terrain is so flat that only the rocks most impervious to weathering remain on the surface. Well-defined river channels cannot form, especially since the extreme age of the soils and consequent high rooting density of native flora limit runoff to an extreme degree.

=== Climate ===
Lake Carnegie has a hot desert climate (Köppen): BWh, with very hot summers and mild winters. Precipitation is low and erratic year-round, with a strong summer peak.

Climate data for Carnegie (25º48'S, 122º58'E, 448 m AMSL) (1988-2024 normals and extremes, rainfall 1942-2024)
Month	Jan	Feb	Mar	Apr	May	Jun	Jul	Aug	Sep	Oct	Nov	Dec	Year
Record high °C (°F)	47.8 (118.0)	47.2 (117.0)	45.5 (113.9)	40.5 (104.9)	35.6 (96.1)	30.9 (87.6)	31.2 (88.2)	35.0 (95.0)	40.1 (104.2)	43.6 (110.5)	44.6 (112.3)	46.5 (115.7)	47.8 (118.0)
Mean daily maximum °C (°F)	38.6 (101.5)	37.3 (99.1)	34.5 (94.1)	30.4 (86.7)	25.3 (77.5)	21.1 (70.0)	21.6 (70.9)	24.3 (75.7)	29.0 (84.2)	33.0 (91.4)	35.8 (96.4)	37.7 (99.9)	30.7 (87.3)
Mean daily minimum °C (°F)	24.0 (75.2)	23.0 (73.4)	20.5 (68.9)	16.2 (61.2)	10.8 (51.4)	7.1 (44.8)	6.0 (42.8)	7.4 (45.3)	11.7 (53.1)	16.4 (61.5)	19.6 (67.3)	22.4 (72.3)	15.4 (59.8)
Record low °C (°F)	13.4 (56.1)	11.3 (52.3)	9.1 (48.4)	5.2 (41.4)	2.4 (36.3)	−3.6 (25.5)	−2.7 (27.1)	−1.2 (29.8)	1.8 (35.2)	3.8 (38.8)	6.7 (44.1)	11.8 (53.2)	−3.6 (25.5)
Average precipitation mm (inches)	38.1 (1.50)	51.6 (2.03)	35.4 (1.39)	23.5 (0.93)	16.5 (0.65)	14.7 (0.58)	11.2 (0.44)	6.9 (0.27)	4.0 (0.16)	7.1 (0.28)	13.5 (0.53)	24.5 (0.96)	248.0 (9.76)
Average precipitation days (≥ 1.0 mm)	3.1	3.5	2.4	2.3	1.8	2.0	1.2	0.9	0.7	1.0	2.1	2.6	23.6
Average afternoon relative humidity (%)	25	29	28	34	33	37	32	26	21	17	21	24	27
Average dew point °C (°F)	11.2 (52.2)	11.0 (51.8)	10.1 (50.2)	9.2 (48.6)	5.8 (42.4)	3.9 (39.0)	2.1 (35.8)	0.7 (33.3)	1.0 (33.8)	1.8 (35.2)	5.0 (41.0)	9.1 (48.4)	5.9 (42.6)
Source: Bureau of Meteorology

== Pastoral leases ==
The lake area is bounded by Windidda, Yelma, Wongawel, Niminga, Carnegie and Prenti Downs pastoral leases, otherwise known in Western Australia as stations.

== Gallery ==
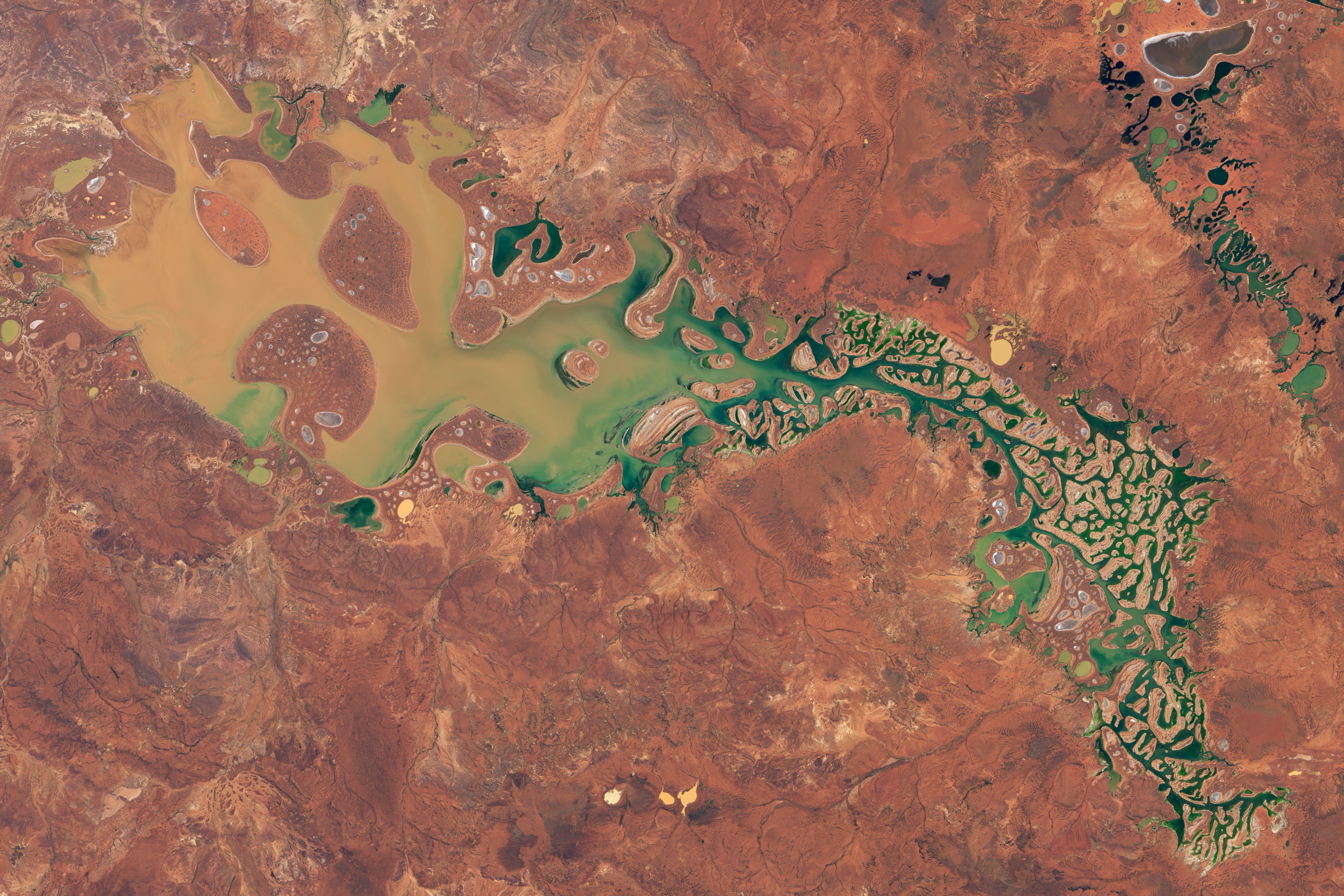
View from space in 2020

== See also ==
- List of lakes of Australia § Western Australia
