= Maduwongga =

Aboriginal people in Western Australia

The Maduwongga are a purported Aboriginal Australian people of the Goldfields-Esperance region of Western Australia.

Martu Wangka has been used as an alternative name but this is now understood to have been incorrect.

== Language ==
Given the confusion over the 'Maduwongga', the language or dialect spoken by those whom Tindale denominated by the term is unclear. When assuming its existence, it is generally classified as a dialect of the Western Desert language. According to Tindale, the language spoken by the Maduwongga was called "Kabal". It has also erroneously been conflated with the Western Desert dialect of Martu Wangka.

== Country ==
In Norman Tindale's estimation, there existed a Maduwongga tribal territory extended over some 9,000 square miles (23,000 km^{2}), ranging westwards from Pinjin on Lake Rebecca as far as Mulline, including the area a few miles south of Menzies, where their borders with the Ngurlu ran, over to Kalgoorlie, Coolgardie, Kanowna, Kurnalpi, and Siberia. Ecologically the group lived in country marked by mallee eucalypt species.

However, Tindale's description of this group and country has not stood close examination. Tindale's informant in 1939 was probably referring to the name for the dialect she spoke and not to a distinct 'tribe'. (Note: 'Where KB is recorded as having used the term 'Maduwongga', or a derivative of that term, she was not referring to a 'tribe' or other society. She was more likely to be telling Tindale about the language or dialect she spoke, which is not necessarily the same thing. Language does not necessarily identify a land-holding group. . .Tindale's mapping of a Maduwongga tribe with its own territory was probably wrong. So it cannot be relied upon as evidence of the extent of any Maduwongga territory during KB's lifetime. This lack of evidence that there was a Maduwongga territory makes it less likely that there was a distinct Maduwongga society at that time.') The case may be a further example of what Paul Bunrke calls 'cartographic ethnogenesis' and the use of the name 'Maduwongga' to describe a 'tribe' or other society only entered into common currency in 1994, shortly after the passage of the Native Title Act.

== History ==
According to Tindale's records of oral traditions, the people he referred to as the Maduwongga may have moved in from an original homeland further east, and displaced the Kalamaia, westwards beyond Bullabulling.

== Alternative names ==
- Jindi, Yindi
- Maduwonga
- Kabul
- Julbaritja (Ngurlu exonym for them meaning 'southerners')

== Sources ==
- Burke, Paul (December 2015). Roberts, Amy; McCaul, Kim (eds.). "Cartographic Ethnogenesis: Tindale's Invention of the Jadira Tribe in the Pilbara Region of Western Australia" (PDF). Journal of the Anthropological Society of South Australia. 39 (Special Edition: Norman B. Tindale's Research Legacy and the Cultural Heritage of Indigenous Australians): 102–126. Archived from the original (PDF) on 1 September 2017.
- "Maduwongga". AIATSIS.
- "AIATSIS map of Indigenous Australia". AIATSIS. 14 May 2024.
- Jackson, Justice Darren John (27 March 2023). "Strickland on behalf of the Maduwongga Claim Group v State of Western Australia FCA 270".
- "Tindale Tribal Boundaries" (PDF). Department of Aboriginal Affairs, Western Australia. September 2016. Archived from the original (PDF) on 8 March 2016.
- Tindale, Norman Barnett (1974). "Maduwongga (WA)". Aboriginal Tribes of Australia: Their Terrain, Environmental Controls, Distribution, Limits, and Proper Names. Australian National University Press. ISBN 978-0-708-10741-6. Archived from the original on 20 March 2020.
