= Lake Wells Station =

Pastoral lease in Western Australia

Coordinates: 27.29°S 123.01°E

Location in Western Australia

Lake Wells Station, often referred to as Lake Wells, is a pastoral lease that operates as a cattle station.

It is located about 160 kilometres (99 mi) north of Laverton and 239 kilometres (149 mi) east of Leinster in the Goldfields-Esperance region of Western Australia.

Les Smith owned the property in 2013 and had been experiencing problems with stock theft for the previous nine years with thieves taking over A$500,000 worth of stock during this time.

The property was placed on the market in 2013 when it occupied an area of 588,084 acres (237,989 ha) and was stocked with 1,000 head of cattle.

== See also ==
- List of ranches and stations
