= Mandjindja =

Aboriginal Australian people of Western Australia

The Mandjindja, Mantjintjarra or Manytjilytjarra are an Aboriginal Australian people of Western Australia belonging to the Western Desert cultural bloc.

== Country ==
Tindale's range estimates

The only information on the Mandjindja's country are estimates given by Norman Tindale. Tindale's estimates (particularly for the peoples of the Western desert) are not considered to be accurate.

Tindale estimated that the Mandjindja's territory extended over roughly 21,000 square miles (54,000 km^{2}), in the sandhill terrain south of the Warburton Range, from a place called Papakula ("Babbagoola Rockhole" on maps). Their western extension went as far as the Gillen and Throssell lakes. Their southern boundaries lay around Amy Rocks and the Saunders Range. Their eastern confines lay around a place named Lenga:na, identified as possibly east of the Sydney Yeo Chasm.

== Language ==
The Mandjindja people speak the Mandjindja language.

== History ==
The Mandjindja people in Kalgoorlie are possibly the descendants of the Manyjilyjarra people who left the Great Sandy and Gibson deserts in 1906 due to an extended drought and then made their way to places such as Kalgoorlie from the 1920s.

== Native title claim ==
The Mandjindja and Ngalia sought recognition of their inherent land rights through the native title claim process in the Federal Court of Australia. An earlier 1996 claim had been dismissed (NNTT 1996).

In March 2009, the Mantjintjarra Ngalia claim came a step closer to recognition after passing the registration test of the Native Title Act. They claimed traditional ownership of the area from around Lake Wells in the east to Lake Darlot and Lake Miranda in the west to Cosmo Newberry through to Leonora and Lake Barlee up to Wiluna in the north.

== Alternative names ==
- Kalgonei
- Kalgoneidjara (Ngaatjatjarra language name for the Mandjindja and Wenamba)
- Mandjindjara
- Mandjindji
- Mandjindjiwongga
- Mandshindshi
- Mangula
- Mangundjara
- Manjinjiwonga
- Mantjila
- Nanggarangku (Pitjantjatjara exonym used of the Mandjindja and the Ngalia, bearing the sense of "hostile men")

Source: Tindale 1974, p. 247

== Sources ==
- "AIATSIS map of Indigenous Australia". AIATSIS. 14 May 2024.
- "Bid for native title rights" (PDF). Kalgoorlie Miner. 6 June 2009.
- "Mantjintjarra Ngalia People apply for recognition of native title". National Native Title Tribunal. 3 June 2009a. Archived from the original on 18 September 2009.
- "Mantjintjarra Ngalia Peoples (WC1996/020)". National Native Title Tribunal. 1996.
- Milonas, Gizem; Hanson, Sue (October 2022). "A Comparison Between Manyjilyjarra and Manytjilytjarra". academia.edu.
- "Native Title Determination Application WAD 372/06 Mantjintjarra Ngalia 2 (WC06/006)" (PDF). NNTT. 4 December 2008.
- "Tindale Tribal Boundaries" (PDF). Department of Aboriginal Affairs, Western Australia. September 2016. Archived from the original (PDF) on 8 March 2016.
- Tindale, Norman Barnett (1974). "Mandjindja (WA)". Aboriginal Tribes of Australia: Their Terrain, Environmental Controls, Distribution, Limits, and Proper Names. Australian National University Press. ISBN 978-0-708-10741-6.
- Tonkinson, Robert (1989). "Local Organisation and Land Tenure in the Karlamilyi (Rudall River) Region" (PDF). In Western Desert Working Group (ed.). The significance of the Karlamilyi Region to the Martujarra people of the Western Desert. Perth: Department of Conservation and Land Management. pp. 99–259.
- "WA - Registration decision - WC06/6-2 Mantjintjarra Ngalia #2". National Native Title Tribunal. 31 March 2009b. Archived from the original on 27 September 2011.
