= Yabu Band =

Australian musical group

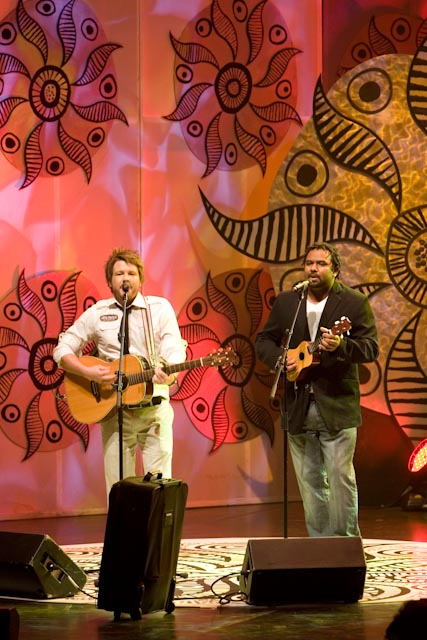
- Yabu Band performing at The Deadly Awards in 2009

Background information
- Origin: Kalgoorlie, Western Australia, Australia
- Genres: Desert rock, reggae, Aboriginal rock, roots
- Label: 1998–present
- Members: Delson Stokes; Boyd Stokes
- Past members: Jade Masters; Lionel Sarmardin

Yabu Band are an Indigenous Australian rock and roots band formed in 1998 in Kalgoorlie. The word yabu is Wongutha – a western desert tribal language – for 'rock' or 'gold'. Core members are brothers Delson (vocals) and Boyd Stokes (guitar and vocals); and Jade Masters (drums) with Lionel Sarmardin (drums 2017). When performing live they are joined by Roy Martinez (bass), Elizabeth Gogos (vocals), Tony Shaw (didgeridoo) and Tim Ayre (keyboards)and other Supporting artist. They won a Deadly award in 2009 for Most Promising New Talent in Music. Delson Stokes Jr was the 1999 NAIDOC Male Youth of the Year. Boyd Stokes won Guitarist of the Year and Jade Masters won Drummer of the Year at the 2009 TOO SOLID Music Awards held in Perth. Yabu are a four time WAMi (West Australia Music Industry) award winner.

In May 2012 Yabu Band toured Australia to promote their single, "Petrol, Paint and Glue", which highlights indigenous abuse of inhalants. Tracks from their next album, My Tjila, were performed. They were supported by Kimberley musician, John Bennett. "Petrol, Paint and Glue" was nominated as Single of the Year at the 2012 Deadlys – to be held in September. Delson had written the track twelve years earlier after a family member had died from petrol sniffing.

Yabu Band released a debut EP in March 2021.

== Discography ==
=== Albums ===
Title	Details
Looking to the Future	Released: 2000; Format: CD
Gundulla - We Dance	Released: May 2009; Label: Yabu Enterprises; Format: digital download

=== Extended plays ===
Title	Details
A Cry in the Wind	Released: 26 March 2021; Label: Yabu Band; Format: digital download, streaming

=== Singles ===
Title	Year	Album
"Looking to the Future"	2001	Looking to the Future
"He Right - He Not Wrong"	2006	
"Noongar Music"	2008	Gundulla - We Dance
"Beautiful Girl"	2009	Gundulla - We Dance
"I Am Australian" (Wongutha Version)	2010	Gundulla - We Dance
"Petrol, Paint & Glue"	2012	
"A Cry in the Wind"	2020	A Cry in the Wind
"Peacemaker"	2021	A Cry in the Wind

== Awards and nominations ==
=== Deadly Awards ===
The Deadly Awards, was an annual celebration of Australian Aboriginal and Torres Strait Islander achievement in music, sport, entertainment and community.

Year	Nominee / work	Award	Result (wins only)
Deadly Awards 2009	Yabu Band	Most Promising New Talent	Won

=== WAM Song of the Year ===
The WAM Song of the Year was formed by the Western Australian Rock Music Industry Association Inc. (WARMIA) in 1985, with its main aim to develop and run annual awards recognising achievements within the music industry in Western Australia.

Year	Nominee / work	Award	Result (wins only)
2008	"Gundulla - We Dance"	Indigenous Song of the Year	Won
2012	"Petrol Paint & Glue"	Mentally Healthy of the Year	Won

=== West Australian Music Industry Awards ===
The West Australian Music Industry Awards (WAMIs) are annual awards presented to the local contemporary music industry, put on annually by the Western Australian Music Industry Association Inc (WAM). Yabu Band won four awards.

Year	Nominee / work	Award	Result (wins only)
2009	Yabu Band	Indigenous Act of the Year	Won
2010	Yabu Band	Indigenous Act of the Year	Won
2011	Yabu Band	Indigenous Act of the Year	Won
2012	Yabu Band	Indigenous Act of the Year	Won
