= Burtville, Western Australia =

Abandoned town in Western Australia

Burtville
- Town
- Coordinates: 28.46°S 122.39°E
- Country: Australia
- State: Western Australia
- LGA: Shire of Laverton
- Location: 29 km (18 mi) SE of Laverton; 247 km (153 mi) NE of Kalgoorlie; 740 km (460 mi) ENE of Perth
- Established: 1902

Government
  - State electorate: Kalgoorlie
  - Federal division: O'Connor
- Elevation: 447 m (1,467 ft)
- Postcode: 6440

Burtville is an abandoned town in the Goldfields-Esperance region of Western Australia, located 29 kilometres (18 mi) south east of Laverton.

== History ==
In 1897, gold was discovered in the area by two prospectors, B. Frost and James E. Tregurtha. The surveyor, J. Rowe, planned the town lots in accordance with the Goldfields Act in 1901. The settlement was initially known as Merolia which is the Indigenous Australian name for the district.

The town was eventually named after the grandson of the first chief justice of the Supreme Court of Western Australia, Sir Archibald Burt. Archibald Edmund Burt JP was the chief mining warden of the Mount Margaret Goldfield. The town was gazetted as Merolia in 1902 but was regazetted to compliment Archibald Edmund Burt later the same year.

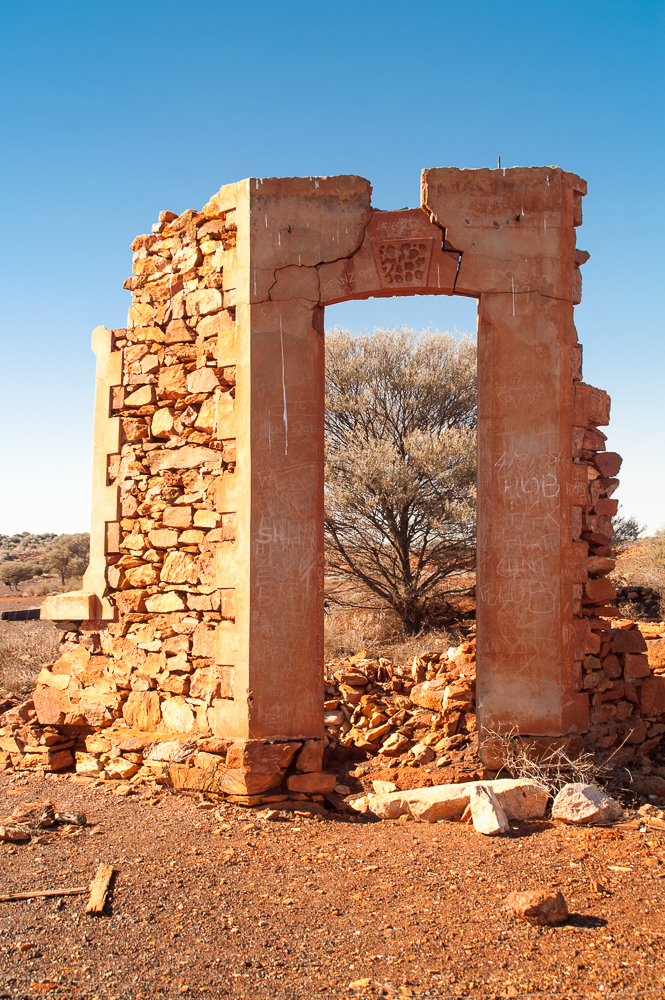
Burtville, 2008

The population of the town and district rose to approximately 400 by 1903 as a result of gold mining. The town also had a water supply from a government well and a sealed pan sanitation system. A police station was opened in 1903 along with a school and two hotels. A ten stamp state battery and five stamp battery known as The Burtville Ore Reduction works were operated within the town from 1903 to 1906. Another privately owned ten stamp battery that allowed public access known as The sons of Westralia was also operating at the time.

By 1916 the population had reduced to 45 and the police station was closed.

All that remains of the town today is the entrance door arch of one of the town's hotels.
