= Lake Wells =

Lake in Western Australia

- Location in Western Australia
- Interactive map of Lake Wells
- Location: Goldfields-Esperance, Western Australia
- Coordinates: 26°43′23″S 123°15′00″E
- Type: Ephemeral
- Basin countries: Australia
- Max. length: 70 km (43 mi)
- Max. width: 52 km (32 mi)
- Surface area: 1,895 km^{2} (732 sq mi)
- Surface elevation: 436 m (1,430 ft)

Lake Wells is an ephemeral salt lake in the centre of Western Australia, lying in close proximity to Lake Carnegie. It lies east of Wiluna and is at the southern edge of the Little Sandy Desert and south western border of the Gibson Desert. It also lies to the north west of the Great Central Road and the Great Victoria Desert. Its surface elevation is 436 metres above mean sea-level. Lake Wells has an area of 1895 square kilometres.

== Discovery ==
Lake Wells was discovered by Europeans in March 1892 during the second part of The Elder Scientific Exploring Expedition 1891–1892. The 1891 phase of the expedition led by David Lindsay had been recalled by its benefactor Sir Thomas Elder, so in February 1892 Lindsay sent his second in command Lawrence Wells on a smaller expedition to explore the area east of the Murchison River in Western Australia. During this expedition Wells (a surveyor) found and named Lake Way, Lake Darlot and Lake Wells.

== See also ==
- Lake Wells Station
- Prenti Downs
