= Windidda =

Pastoral lease in Western Australia

Coordinates: 26.388°S 122.211°E

Location in Western Australia

Windidda Station, often referred to as Windidda, is a pastoral lease that operates as a cattle station. It is located about 199 kilometres (124 mi) east of Wiluna and 226 kilometres (140 mi) north east of Leinster in the Mid West region of Western Australia.

The property occupies an area of 3,550 square kilometres (1,371 sq mi). Windidda shares a boundary with Carnegie and Prenti Downs Stations.

== History ==
The property was established in about 1900 by the pioneer, James Bett Willis, who had sunk the first well to produce drinkable water in the area. Willis had a partnership with Tommy Mellor in stocking and improving the other otherwise virgin country. In 1948 the property was still owned by Willis, who also owned Clover Downs Station.

J. Bell owned the property in 1950 and sold it to Spencer Doman. At this stage the property occupied an area of 1,000,000 acres (4,047 km^{2}). Doman also owned Wongawol, Carnegie, Yelma and Bonython stations, which had a combined area of 3,750,000 acres (15,176 km^{2}).

In the 1970s the Linke family, run by the three Linke brothers, acquired Windidda, Carnegie and Prenti Downs Stations, which they ran as a single entity. In 1992 the leaseholding was broken up into three smaller leases and Windidda was acquired by the Ngangganawili Community Incorporated.

The RSPCA were called to investigate the property in 2002.

=== 2005 cattle inspection ===
In 2005 approximately 500 cattle were found dead on the property, which appeared to have been abandoned. RSPCA inspectors were called to the property to provide assistance to the remaining 2,500 cattle. Only two of the station's 13 watering points were found be in working order and the livestock were so neglected that a further 30 head of stock had to be put down. The Aboriginal corporation that held the lease to the property, Ngangganawili Community Incorporated, were thought to have left the property for law business but had left no provision for the livestock. The RSPCA described it as the worst case of neglect seen in Western Australia.

Later the same year the property was effectively destocked with 1,818 cattle being mustered and sold. The remaining 300 were likely to sold to with proceeds going back to the Wandidda Aboriginal Community, who had replaced Ngangganawili Community Incorporated after it was dissolved. The Wandidda Aboriginal Corporation forfeited the pastoral lease and the property was passed under management of the Pastoral Lands Board.

The community were later fined A$10,000 after pleading guilty to failing to provide adequate water for over 1,500 head of cattle at Windidda.

== See also ==
- List of ranches and stations
- List of pastoral leases in Western Australia
