= Prenti Downs =

Pastoral lease in Western Australia

Coordinates: 26.516°S 122.807°E

Location in Western Australia

Prenti Downs Station is a pastoral lease and cattle station located in the Mid West region of Western Australia.

It is situated approximately 257 km (160 mi) to the east of Wiluna and 237 km (147 mi) north of Laverton. Neighbouring properties include Carnegie and Windidda Stations.

The area is composed of a mixture of landscapes including saltbush dominated clay pans, mulga country and grasslands. The stock can be watered at 34 different water points as well as numerous claypans and fresh water creeks. In 2013 Prenti Downs was carrying a herd of 4,000 shorthorn cattle.

The property was put on the market in 2013, when it occupied an area of 3,835 km^{2} (1,481 sq mi); Prenti Downs was sold in late March 2015 to the Carmody family who have since taken over management of the property. An area of approximately 1,000 km^{2} (386 sq mi) in the middle of the property making up the area of Lake Carnegie was not included in the sale.

== New Management ==
After purchasing the property a new style of management of livestock was introduced, self mustering yards, in an effort to manage large feral herbivores and wild cattle. This reduces animal stress, and non-productive grazers.

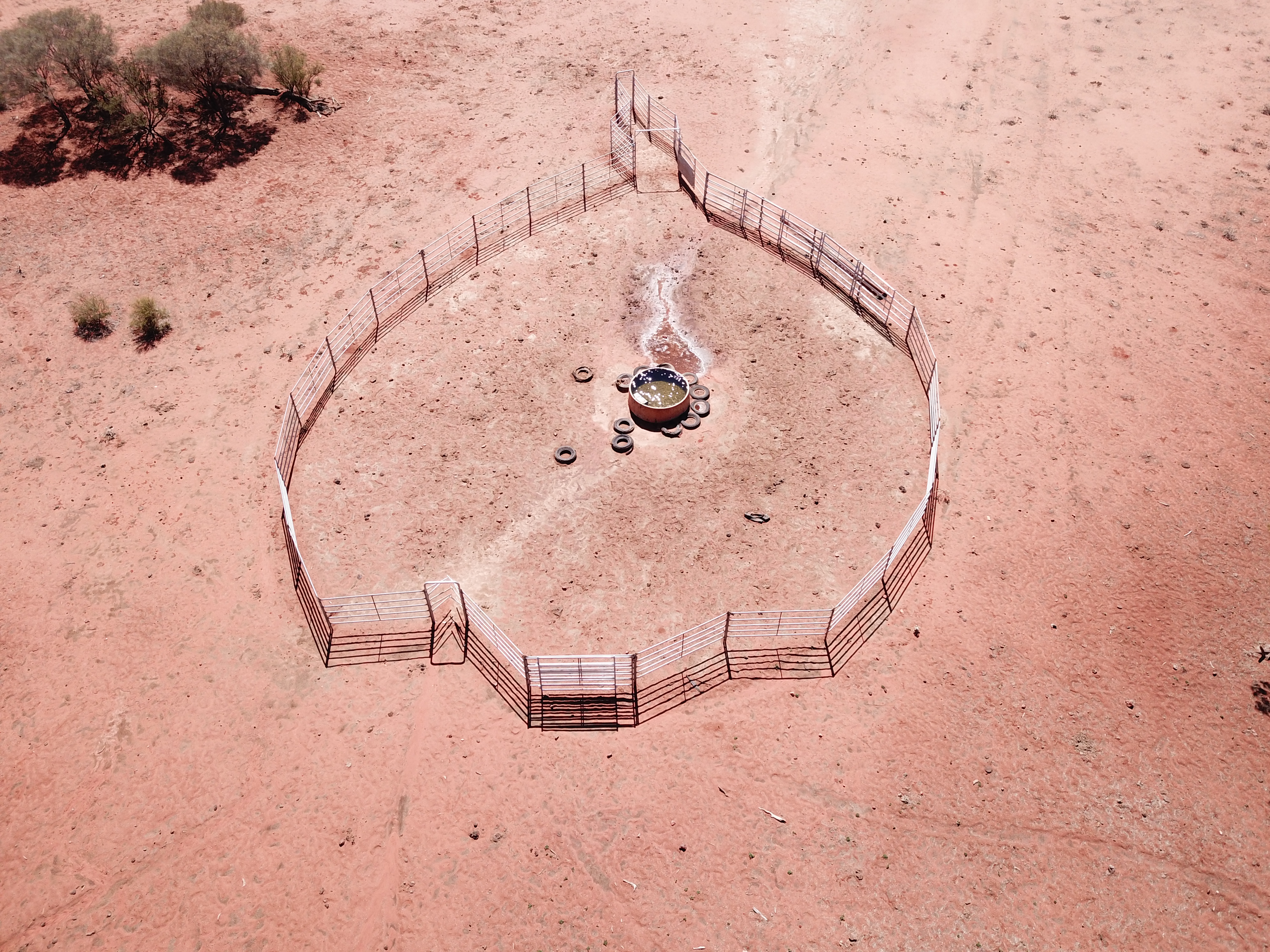
Set of Self mustering yards on Prenti Downs

== Technology Driven ==
Since registering a Human-induced regeneration carbon sequestration project Prenti Downs have started to deploy a remote monitoring system across the property to better manage the total grazing pressure in an effort to promote the restoration of native forest cover.

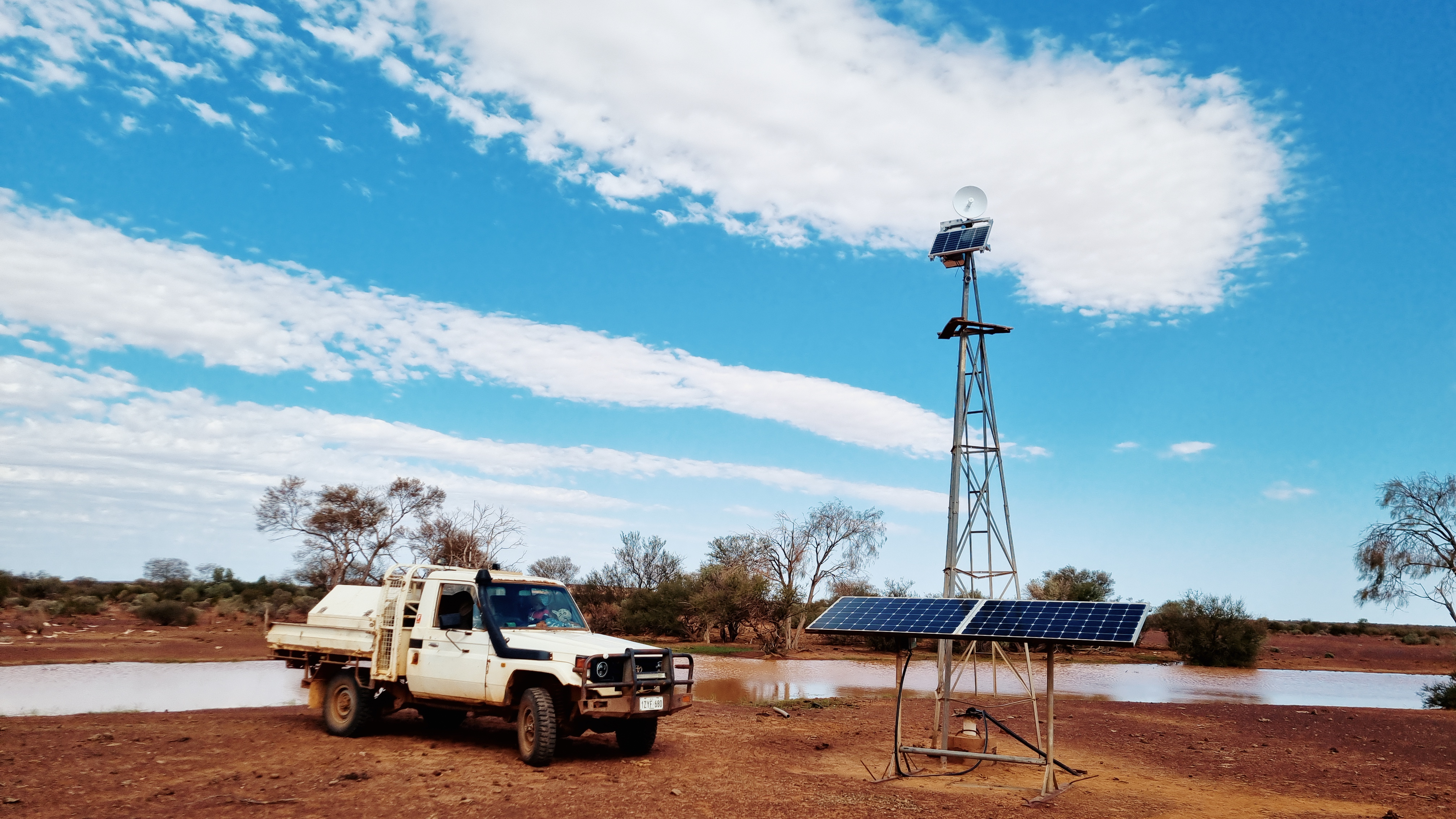
Repurposed windmill frame hosts a wireless monitoring unit

== See also ==
- List of ranches and stations
- List of pastoral leases in Western Australia
