= Carnegie Station =

Pastoral lease in Western Australia

Location in Western Australia

Carnegie Station (25°47'45.0"S 122°58'31.1"E), or Carnegie pastoral lease, is located north of Laverton and east of Wiluna in Western Australia and is the most eastern of pastoral leases found on the Gunbarrel Highway.

In some sources it is identified as Carnegie, with the features including a homestead, outstation, outcamp, woolshed, and Aboriginal outstation.

The area of the station is also within the Wiluna Native Title Claim area, also known as the Martu claim that was clarified in 2013.

The Carnegie Station Airport is located approximately 10 kilometres (6 mi) west of the homestead.

== Geography ==
Located on the western edge of the Gibson Desert and the southern edge of the Little Sandy Desert, it is situated on the eastern side of the Lady Lawley Range, north of Lake Carnegie and is found at the western terminus of the original Gunbarrel Highway.

=== Climate ===
Carnegie has a subtropical desert climate (Köppen: BWh) with very hot, slightly wetter summers and mild, dry winters. Expectedly, the station is very sunny. On average, it receives 179.4 clear days and only 66.1 cloudy days per annum. Extreme temperatures ranged from 47.8 °C (118.0 °F) on 14 January 2022 to −3.6 °C (25.5 °F) on 14 June 2006. The wettest recorded day was 10 January 2006 with 270.0 mm (10.63 in) of rainfall.

Climate data for Carnegie (25.80°S 122.98°E) (448 m (1,470 ft) AMSL) (1942-2025)
Month	Jan	Feb	Mar	Apr	May	Jun	Jul	Aug	Sep	Oct	Nov	Dec	Year
Record high °C (°F)	47.8 (118.0)	47.2 (117.0)	45.5 (113.9)	40.5 (104.9)	35.6 (96.1)	30.9 (87.6)	31.2 (88.2)	35.0 (95.0)	40.1 (104.2)	43.6 (110.5)	44.6 (112.3)	46.5 (115.7)	47.8 (118.0)
Mean daily maximum °C (°F)	38.7 (101.7)	37.4 (99.3)	34.6 (94.3)	30.3 (86.5)	25.3 (77.5)	21.2 (70.2)	21.6 (70.9)	24.3 (75.7)	28.9 (84.0)	33.1 (91.6)	35.8 (96.4)	37.8 (100.0)	30.8 (87.3)
Mean daily minimum °C (°F)	24.0 (75.2)	23.1 (73.6)	20.5 (68.9)	16.2 (61.2)	10.7 (51.3)	7.1 (44.8)	5.9 (42.6)	7.4 (45.3)	11.6 (52.9)	16.4 (61.5)	19.6 (67.3)	22.4 (72.3)	15.4 (59.7)
Record low °C (°F)	13.4 (56.1)	11.3 (52.3)	9.1 (48.4)	5.2 (41.4)	2.4 (36.3)	−3.6 (25.5)	−2.7 (27.1)	−1.2 (29.8)	1.8 (35.2)	3.8 (38.8)	6.7 (44.1)	11.8 (53.2)	−3.6 (25.5)
Average precipitation mm (inches)	38.0 (1.50)	51.0 (2.01)	35.0 (1.38)	23.1 (0.91)	16.3 (0.64)	14.6 (0.57)	11.0 (0.43)	7.7 (0.30)	4.3 (0.17)	7.4 (0.29)	14.3 (0.56)	25.4 (1.00)	248.2 (9.77)
Average precipitation days (≥ 0.2 mm)	4.4	4.9	3.7	3.6	2.7	3.2	2.1	1.5	1.0	1.6	3.3	3.8	35.8
Average afternoon relative humidity (%)	25	29	28	34	33	37	32	26	21	17	21	24	27
Average dew point °C (°F)	11.2 (52.2)	11.0 (51.8)	10.1 (50.2)	9.2 (48.6)	5.8 (42.4)	3.9 (39.0)	2.1 (35.8)	0.7 (33.3)	1.0 (33.8)	1.8 (35.2)	5.0 (41.0)	9.1 (48.4)	5.9 (42.6)
Source: Bureau of Meteorology (1942-2025)

== History ==
The history of the station is related to the history of the Linke family.

Due to its isolated location, artefacts from explorers and earlier travels are known to have been observed or found in the station area, as well as more recently, lost or ill-equipped travellers in the area.

In 1940, G Lanagan and his wife drove 800 cattle from the Kimberley to the station, a distance of 900 miles (1,400 km), utilising in part the Canning Stock Route.

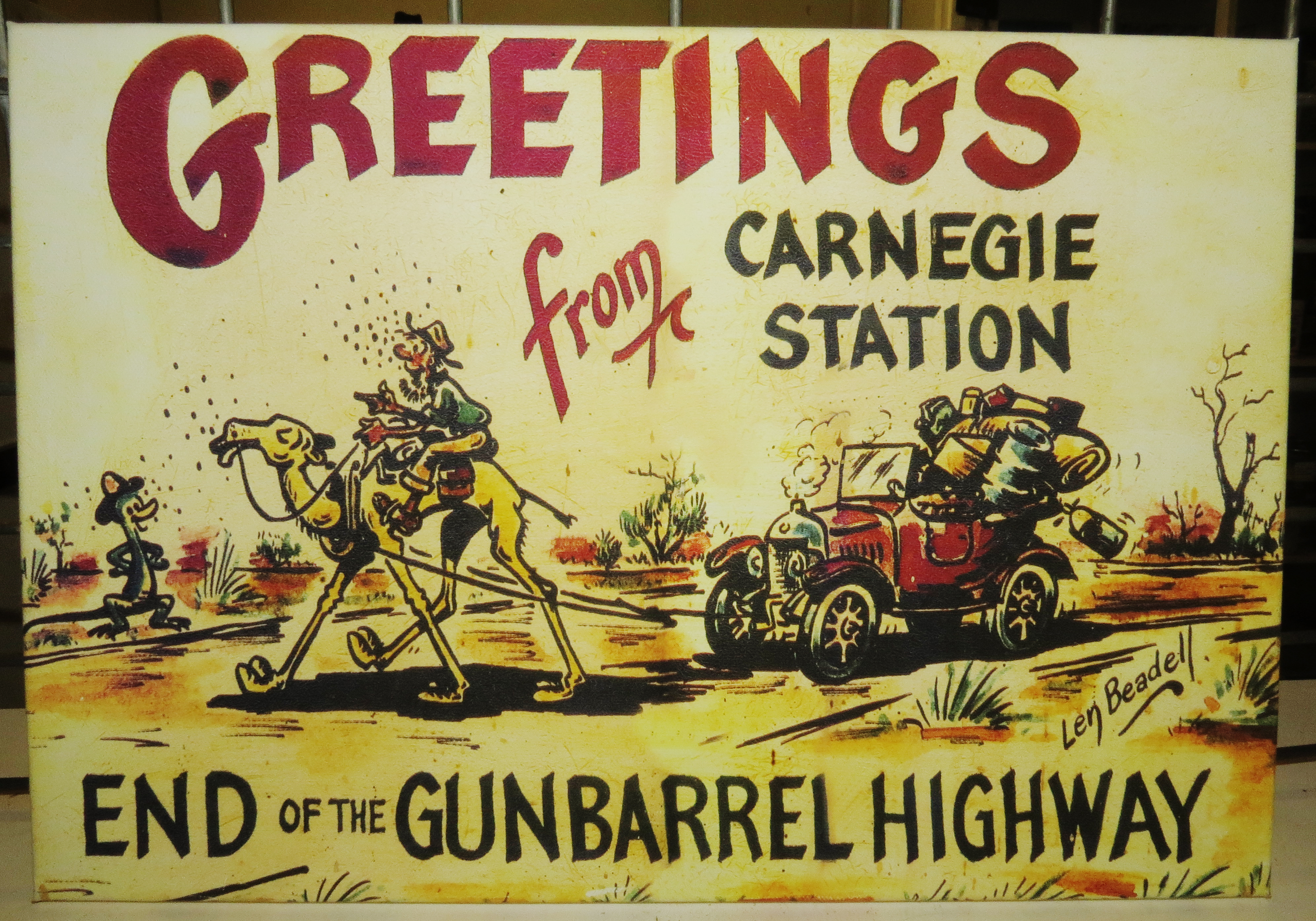
Image of an original cartoon at Carnegie Station painted by Len Beadell
