= Proceedings of the American Philosophical Society =

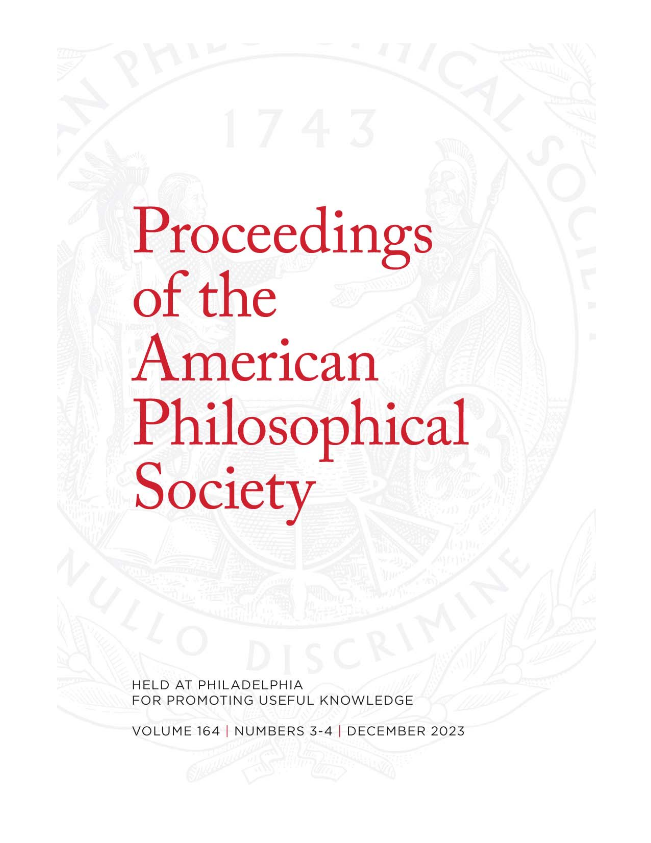
- Discipline: All academic fields
- Language: English

Publication details
- History: 1838–present
- Publisher: American Philosophical Society (United States)
- Frequency: Quarterly

Standard abbreviations
- ISO 4: Proc. Am. Philos. Soc.

Indexing
- ISSN: 0003-049X
- JSTOR: 0003049X

Links
- Journal homepage

Proceedings of the American Philosophical Society is a quarterly journal published by the American Philosophical Society since 1838. The journal contains papers which have been read at meetings of the American Philosophical Society each April and November, independent essays sent to the APS by outside scholars, and biographical memoirs of APS Members.
