= Lake Darlot =

Ephemeral lake in Western Australia

- Location in Western Australia
- Interactive map of Lake Darlot
- Location: Goldfields-Esperance, Western Australia
- Coordinates: 27°45′40″S 121°22′30″E
- Type: Ephemeral
- Basin countries: Australia
- Max. length: 60 km (37 mi)
- Max. width: 15 km (9.3 mi)
- Surface elevation: 434 m (1,424 ft)

Lake Darlot is an ephemeral lake in the centre of Western Australia, lying approximately 50 km (31 mi) east-north-east of Leinster, and 125 km (78 mi) north of Leonora in the Goldfields-Esperance region. Its surface elevation is 434 metres above mean sea-level.

== Discovery ==
Lake Darlot was discovered in March 1892 during the second part of The Elder Scientific Exploring Expedition 1891-1892. The 1891 phase of the expedition led by David Lindsay had been recalled by its benefactor Sir Thomas Elder, so in February 1892 Lindsay sent his second in command Lawrence Wells on a smaller expedition to explore the area east of the Murchison River in Western Australia. During this expedition Wells (a surveyor) found and named Lake Way, Lake Darlot and Lake Wells. Lake Darlot was named after a well known squatter of the Murchison area, Lou Darlot.

== See also ==
- List of lakes of Western Australia
