= Department of Aboriginal Affairs (Western Australia) =

Government department in Western Australia between 2013 and 2017

The Department of Aboriginal Affairs (Western Australia) is the former government authority that was involved with the matters of the Aboriginal population of Western Australia between 2013 and 2017.

== Aborigines Protection Board ==
Prior to the creation of the Aborigines Department in 1898, there had been an Aborigines Protection Board, which operated between 1 January 1886 and 1 April 1898 as a statutory authority. It was created by the Aborigines Protection Act 1886 (50 Vict. No. 25 (WA)), also known as the Half-Caste Act, An Act to provide for the better protection and management of the Aboriginal natives of Western Australia, and to amend the law relating to certain contracts with such Aboriginal natives; An Act to provide certain matters connected with the Aborigines (52 Vict. No. 24).

The board was replaced in 1898 by the Aborigines Department.

== Current status ==
The department took its current name in May 2013.

On 28 April 2017 Premier Mark McGowan announced that Western Australia's 41 departments would be reduced to 25 departments by 1 July 2017. The departments of Planning, Lands, Heritage and the Aboriginal heritage and land functions of the Department of Aboriginal Affairs amalgamated on 1 July 2017, forming the Department of Planning, Lands and Heritage. The Department of the Premier and Cabinet assumed responsibility for Aboriginal Affairs policy.

== Agencies ==
- Aborigines Department - 1 Apr 1898 ~ 31 Dec 1908
- Department of Aborigines and Fisheries - 1 Jan 1909 ~ 1 Jan 1920
- Aborigines Department - 1 January 1926 – 1 January 1936
- Department of the North West - 1 January 1920 – 1 January 1926
- Fisheries Department - 1 January 1920 – 1 September 1964
- Department of Native Affairs - 1 January 1936 – 31 December 1954
- Department of Native Welfare - 1 January 1955 – 16 June 1972
- Aboriginal Affairs Planning Authority - 16 June 1972 – 31 October 1994
- Aboriginal Affairs Department - 1 November 1994 – 30 June 2001
- Department of Indigenous Affairs - 1 July 2001 – 16 May 2013
- Department of Aboriginal Affairs - 2013 - 2017
- Department of Planning, Lands and Heritage (DPLH) 2017-

== See also ==
- Protector of Aborigines
