= Eremophila ferricola =

Conservation status
- Priority One — Poorly Known Taxa (DEC)

Scientific classification
- Kingdom: Plantae
- Clade: Tracheophytes
- Clade: Angiosperms
- Clade: Eudicots
- Clade: Asterids
- Order: Lamiales
- Family: Scrophulariaceae
- Genus: Eremophila
- Species: E. ferricola

Binomial name
- Eremophila ferricola Buirchell & A.P.Br.

Species of flowering plant

Eremophila ferricola is a flowering plant in the figwort family, Scrophulariaceae and is endemic to Western Australia. It is an erect shrub with lance-shaped leaves and yellowish brown to greenish yellow flowers covered with fine hairs. The species is only known from a single location, growing on a banded ironstone hill.

== Description ==
Eremophila ferricola is an erect shrub growing to 1–3 m (3–10 ft) high and 1–2 m (3–7 ft) wide with warty, glabrous branches. The leaves are arranged alternately, green, lance-shaped, 25–90 mm (1–4 in) long, 6–30 mm (0.2–1 in) wide with a prominent mid-vein. The flowers are borne singly in leaf axils on a glabrous stalk 10–25 mm (0.4–1 in) long. There are five overlapping, lance-shaped sepals 7–17 mm (0.3–0.7 in) long and 4–12 mm (0.2–0.5 in) wide. The sepals are bright green to greenish-brown and glabrous apart from matted hairs on their tips. The petals are yellowish brown to greenish yellow, 20–30 mm (0.8–1 in) long and joined at their lower end to form a tube which is covered inside and out with short, soft hairs. The four stamens extend beyond the end of the petal tube. Flowering time is mainly from July to September.

== Taxonomy and naming ==
Eremophila ferricola was first formally described by Bevan Buirchell and Andrew Brown in 2016 and the description was published in Nuytsia. The specific epithet (ferricola) is derived from the Latin word ferrum meaning "iron" and the Latin suffix -cola meaning "dweller" or "inhabitant" referring to the habitat of this species.

== Distribution and habitat ==
This eremophila is only known from a single population near Mullewa in the Yalgoo biogeographic region growing in ironstone soils near the top of a banded ironstone hill in dense shrubland.

== Conservation status ==
Eremophila ferricola has been classified as "Priority One" by the Government of Western Australia Department of Parks and Wildlife, meaning that it is known from only one or a few locations which are potentially at risk.
