= Eremophila scrobiculata =

Conservation status
- Priority One — Poorly Known Taxa (DEC)

Scientific classification
- Kingdom: Plantae
- Clade: Embryophytes
- Clade: Tracheophytes
- Clade: Spermatophytes
- Clade: Angiosperms
- Clade: Eudicots
- Clade: Asterids
- Order: Lamiales
- Family: Scrophulariaceae
- Genus: Eremophila
- Species: E. scrobiculata

Binomial name
- Eremophila scrobiculata Buirchell & A.P.Br.

Synonyms
- Eremophila sp. 'Wanna'

Species of flowering plant

Eremophila scrobiculata is low, spreading shrub with sessile, linear leaves and lilac-coloured flowers and that is endemic to Western Australia. It grows on the slopes of low, stony hills on Wanna Station.

== Description ==
Eremophila scrobiculata is a shrub that typically grows to 30–50 cm (12–20 in) high and 80–100 cm (31–39 in) wide. Its branches are glabrous and grey. The leaves are arranged alternately, clustered near the ends of the branches, sessile, more or less glabrous, linear but thickened, 6–8 mm (0.24–0.31 in) long and 1–1.5 mm (0.039–0.059 in) wide. The flowers are borne singly in leaf axils on a pedicel 1–2 mm (0.039–0.079 in) long. There are five triangular to lance-shaped, green sepals that are 3–6 mm (0.12–0.24 in) long and 0.5–2.5 mm (0.020–0.098 in) wide with a few scattered hairs. The petal tube is lilac-coloured, 8–10 mm (0.31–0.39 in) long and lacks spots. The four stamens are enclosed in the petal tube. Flowering mainly occurs from June to August but also at other times after rainfall.

== Taxonomy and naming ==
This species was first formally described in 2016 by Bevan Buirchell and Andrew Phillip Brown in the journal Nuytsia from specimens on Wanna Station (north of Mount Augustus National Park) in 2005. The specific epithet (scrobiculata) is from the Latin scrobiculatus meaning "scrobiculate", or "furrowed or having the surface dotted all over with small round depressions" referring to the leaves.

== Distribution and habitat ==
Eremophila scrobiculata is only known from the type location where it grows on the slopes of small, stony hills in the Gascoyne biogeographic region.

== Conservation ==
Eremophila scrobiculata classified as "Priority One" by the Government of Western Australia Department of Parks and Wildlife, meaning that it is known from only one or a few locations which are potentially at risk.
