= Eremophila resiliens =

Conservation status
- Priority One — Poorly Known Taxa (DEC)

Scientific classification
- Kingdom: Plantae
- Clade: Embryophytes
- Clade: Tracheophytes
- Clade: Spermatophytes
- Clade: Angiosperms
- Clade: Eudicots
- Clade: Asterids
- Order: Lamiales
- Family: Scrophulariaceae
- Genus: Eremophila
- Species: E. resiliens

Binomial name
- Eremophila resiliens Buirchell & A.P.Br.

Synonyms
- Eremophila sp. 'Nooloo Breakaway'

Species of flowering plant

Eremophila resiliens is a low-growing shrub with deep reddish purple flowers, woolly hairy leaves and that is endemic to Western Australia. It grows on slopes and breakaways near Lake Carnegie.

== Description ==
Eremophila resiliens is a shrub that typically grows to 15–30 cm (5.9–11.8 in) high and 30–75 cm (12–30 in) wide. Its branches are grey with long, woolly hairs. The leaves are arranged alternately, clustered near the ends of the branches, sessile, grey, covered with woolly hairs, lance-shaped to egg-shaped, 7–20 mm (0.28–0.79 in) long and 3–7 mm (0.12–0.28 in) wide. The flowers are borne singly in leaf axils on a straight, woolly pedicel 5–8 mm (0.20–0.31 in) long. There are five linear to oblong, green sepals that are 8–12 mm (0.31–0.47 in) long, 1.5–4 mm (0.059–0.157 in) wide and hairy on the outside. The petal tube is deep reddish purple, 15–20 mm (0.59–0.79 in) long with small spots inside, glandular hairs on the outside and long wispy hairs inside and near the tips of the upper petal lobes. The four stamens are enclosed in the petal tube. Flowering mainly occurs in August but also at other times after rainfall.

== Taxonomy and naming ==
This species was first formally described in 2016 by Bevan Buirchell and Andrew Phillip Brown in the journal Nuytsia from specimens collected west of Carnegie in 2010. The specific epithet (resiliens) is a Latin word meaning "springing back", referring to the species' ability to recover from drought.

== Distribution and habitat ==
Eremophila resiliens is only known from a small area west of Carnegie where it grows in stony soil on slopes and breakaways in the Gascoyne biogeographic region.

== Conservation ==
Eremophila resiliens is classified as "Priority One" by the Government of Western Australia Department of Parks and Wildlife, meaning that it is known from only one or a few locations which are potentially at risk.
