= Eremophila daddii =

Conservation status
- Priority One — Poorly Known Taxa (DEC)

Scientific classification
- Kingdom: Plantae
- Clade: Tracheophytes
- Clade: Angiosperms
- Clade: Eudicots
- Clade: Asterids
- Order: Lamiales
- Family: Scrophulariaceae
- Genus: Eremophila
- Species: E. daddii

Binomial name
- Eremophila daddii Buirchell & A.P.Br.

Species of flowering plant

Eremophila daddii is a flowering plant in the figwort family, Scrophulariaceae and is endemic to Western Australia. It is a large shrub with sticky branches, hairy leaves and brown and cream-coloured flowers blotched with purple.

== Description ==
Eremophila daddii is a shrub growing to 2–3 m (7–10 ft) high and 2–4 m (7–10 ft) wide with sticky, hairy branches. The leaves are arranged alternately, clustered near the ends of the branches, dull green, lance-shaped, 30–100 mm (1–4 in) long and 10–20 mm (0.4–0.8 in) wide. The flowers are borne singly in leaf axils on a hairy stalk 15–20 mm (0.6–0.8 in) long. There are 5 lance-shaped, light brown, hairy sepals 18–31 mm (0.7–1 in) long and 8–18 mm (0.3–0.7 in) wide which turn pinkish as they age. The petals are light brown and cream with purple spots or blotches, 20–30 mm (0.8–1 in) long and joined at their lower end to form a tube which has a few short hairs inside and out. The four stamens extend beyond the end of the petal tube. Flowering time is mainly from June to September.

== Taxonomy and naming ==
Eremophila daddii was first formally described by Bevan Buirchell and Andrew Brown in 2016 and the description was published in Nuytsia. The specific epithet (daddii) honours Ronald James Dadd of Goomalling who discovered this species.

== Distribution and habitat ==
This eremophila is only known from a single population near Wiluna in the Gascoyne and Murchison biogeographic regions growing near granite outcrops and eroded hillsides with Acacia and other Eremophila species.

== Conservation status ==
Eremophila daddii has been classified as "Priority One" by the Government of Western Australia Department of Parks and Wildlife, meaning that it is known from only one or a few locations which are potentially at risk.
