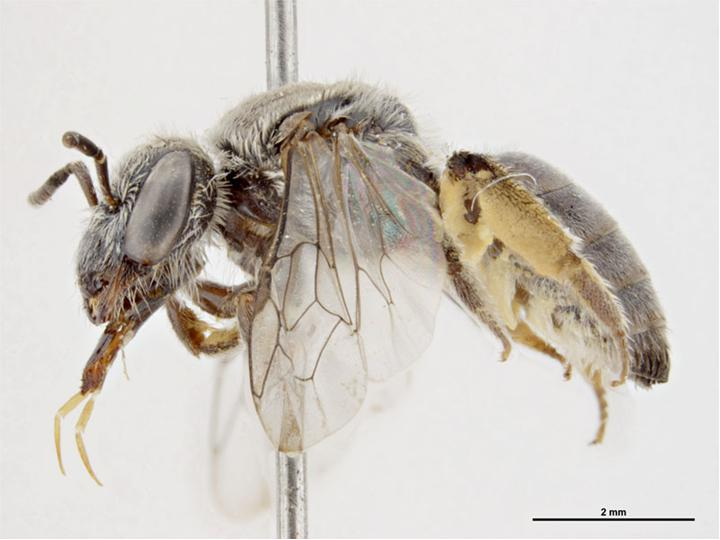
- Female

Scientific classification
- Kingdom: Animalia
- Phylum: Arthropoda
- Clade: Pancrustacea
- Class: Insecta
- Order: Hymenoptera
- Family: Colletidae
- Genus: Leioproctus
- Species: L. longipalpus

Binomial name
- Leioproctus longipalpus Houston, 1990

= Leioproctus longipalpus =

Species of bee

Leioproctus longipalpus, or Leioproctus (Leioproctus) longipalpus, is a species of bee in the family Colletidae and subfamily Colletinae. It is endemic to Australia. It was described by Australian entomologist Terry Houston in 1990.

== Etymology ==
The specific epithet longipalpus is an anatomical reference to the relatively long labial palpi.

== Description ==
The male holotype body length is about 6.5 mm (0.26 in), head width 1.85 mm (0.073 in); female paratype body length 8.4 mm, head width 2.35 mm. Integumental colouration is mainly black; the hair is mainly white.

== Distribution and habitat ==
The species occurs in Western Australia. The type locality is 12 km east of Marandoo Camp in the Pilbara region.

== Behaviour ==
The adults are flying mellivores. Flowering plants visited by the bees include Eremophila forrestii.

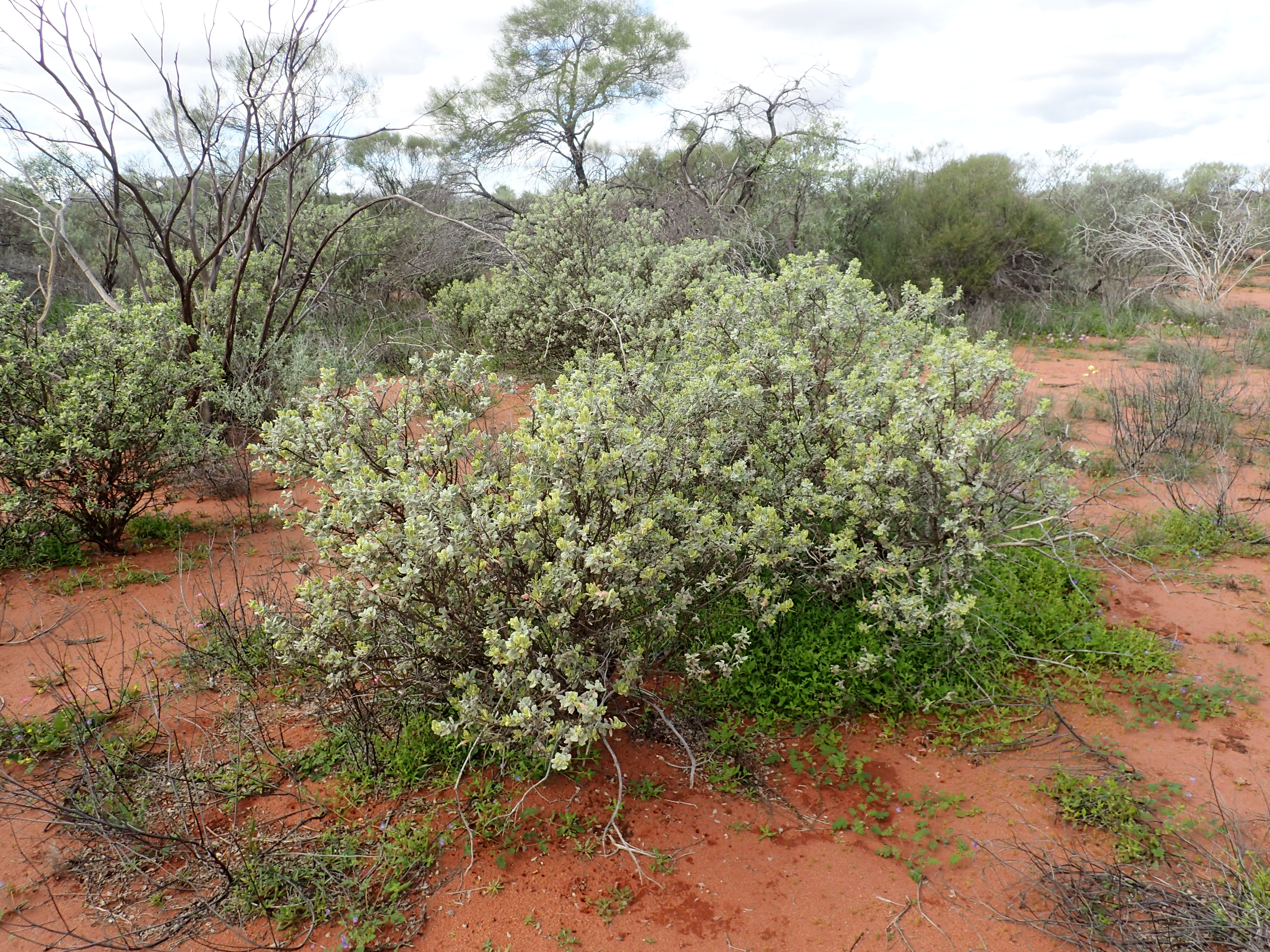
Eremophila forrestii (Wilcox bush), a forage plant of the bees

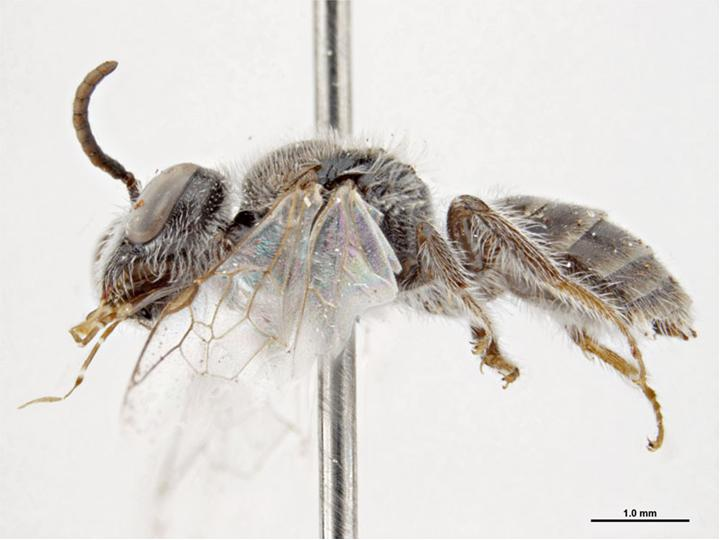
Male
