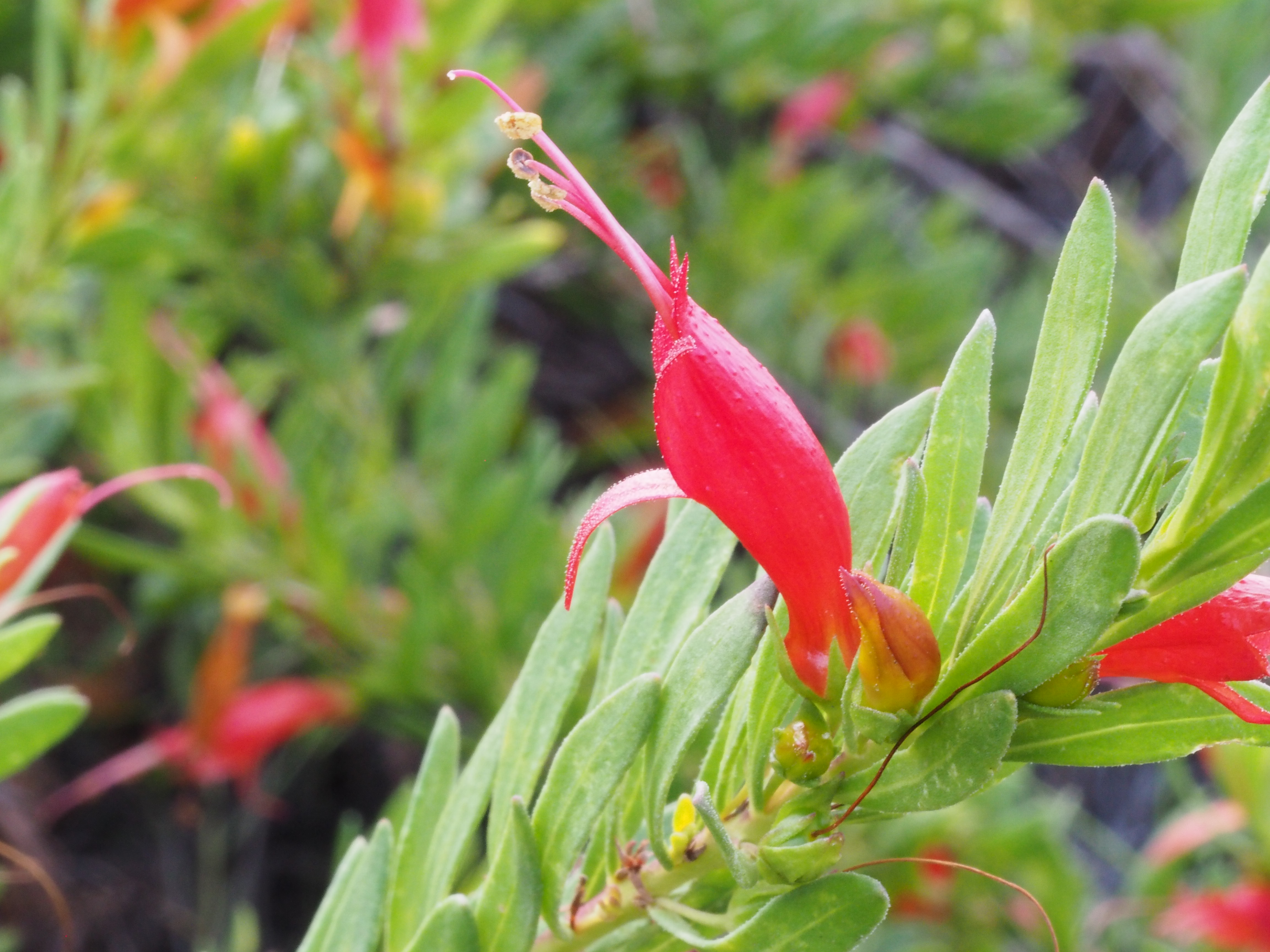
- In Port Gregory

Scientific classification
- Kingdom: Plantae
- Clade: Tracheophytes
- Clade: Angiosperms
- Clade: Eudicots
- Clade: Asterids
- Order: Lamiales
- Family: Scrophulariaceae
- Genus: Eremophila
- Species: E. glabra
- Subspecies: E. g. subsp. carnosa

Trinomial name
- Eremophila glabra subsp. carnosa Chinnock

= Eremophila glabra subsp. carnosa =

Subspecies of flowering plant

Eremophila glabra subsp. carnosa is a plant in the family Scrophulariaceae and is endemic to Western Australia. It is similar to other shrubs in the species Eremophila glabra but is distinguished from them mainly by its narrow elliptic to lance-shaped leaves and by the type and arrangement of hairs on its leaves and branches. It is found in coastal areas between Leeman and Gregory.

== Description ==
Eremophila glabra subsp. carnosa is a spreading shrub growing to 0.3–1 metre (1–3 ft) high. The leaves are bright green, slightly fleshy, well-spaced along the branches, lance-shaped, 38–53 millimetres (1–2 in) long and 4–8 millimetres (0.2–0.3 in) wide.

The flowers occur singly in the leaf axils on flower stalks 6–10 millimetres (0.2–0.4 in) long. There are 5 overlapping, thick and fleshy sepals which are lance-shaped, 5–7 millimetres (0.2–0.3 in) long and 1–3 millimetres (0.04–0.1 in) wide. The 5 petals form a tube 20–25 millimetres (0.8–1 in) long. The lowest petal lobe is narrower that the rest and is turned back below the flower. Flowering occurs from May to January and is followed by fruit which are oval to almost spherical and 6–7 millimetres (0.2–0.3 in) long.

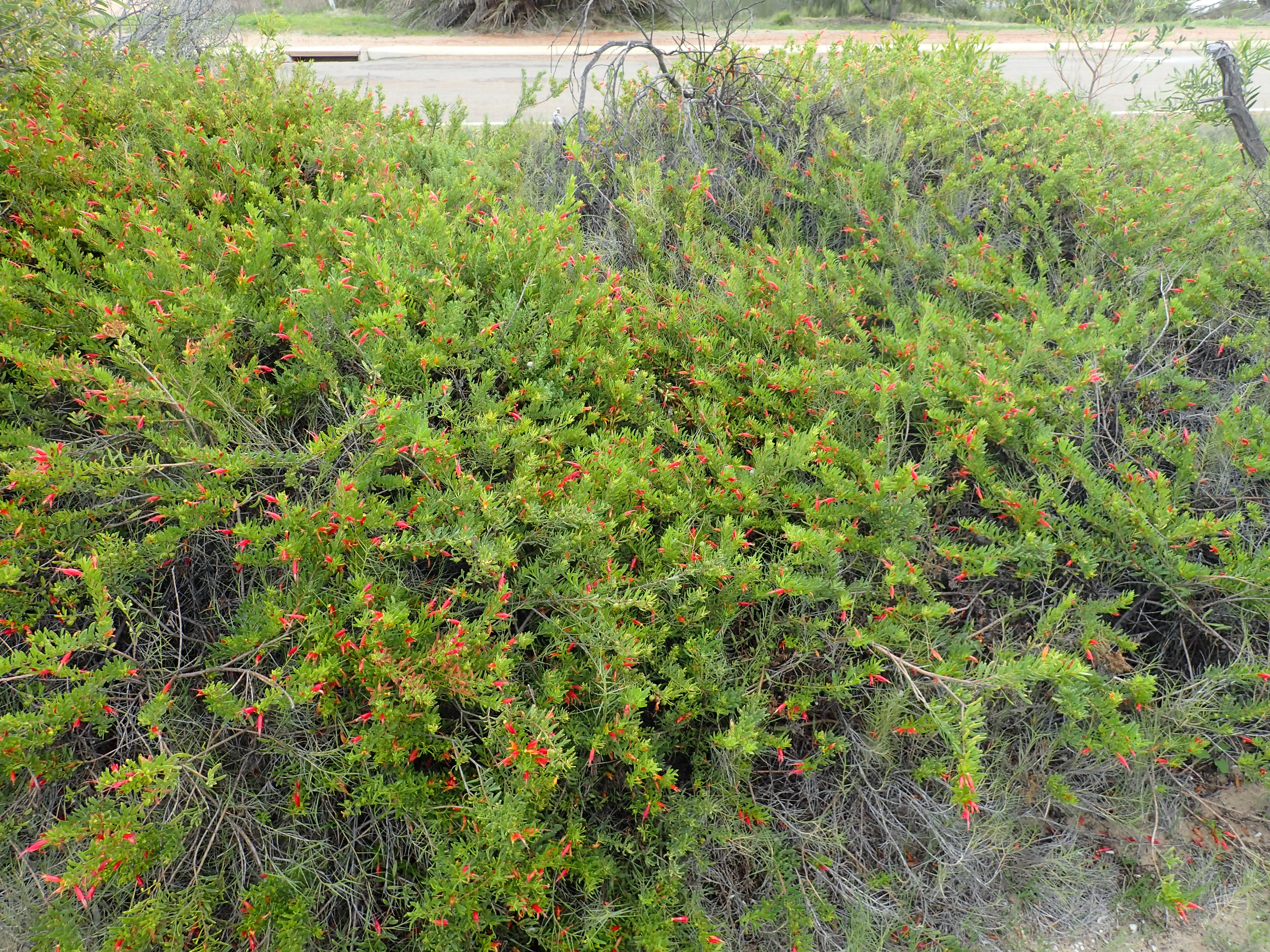
In the township of Gregory

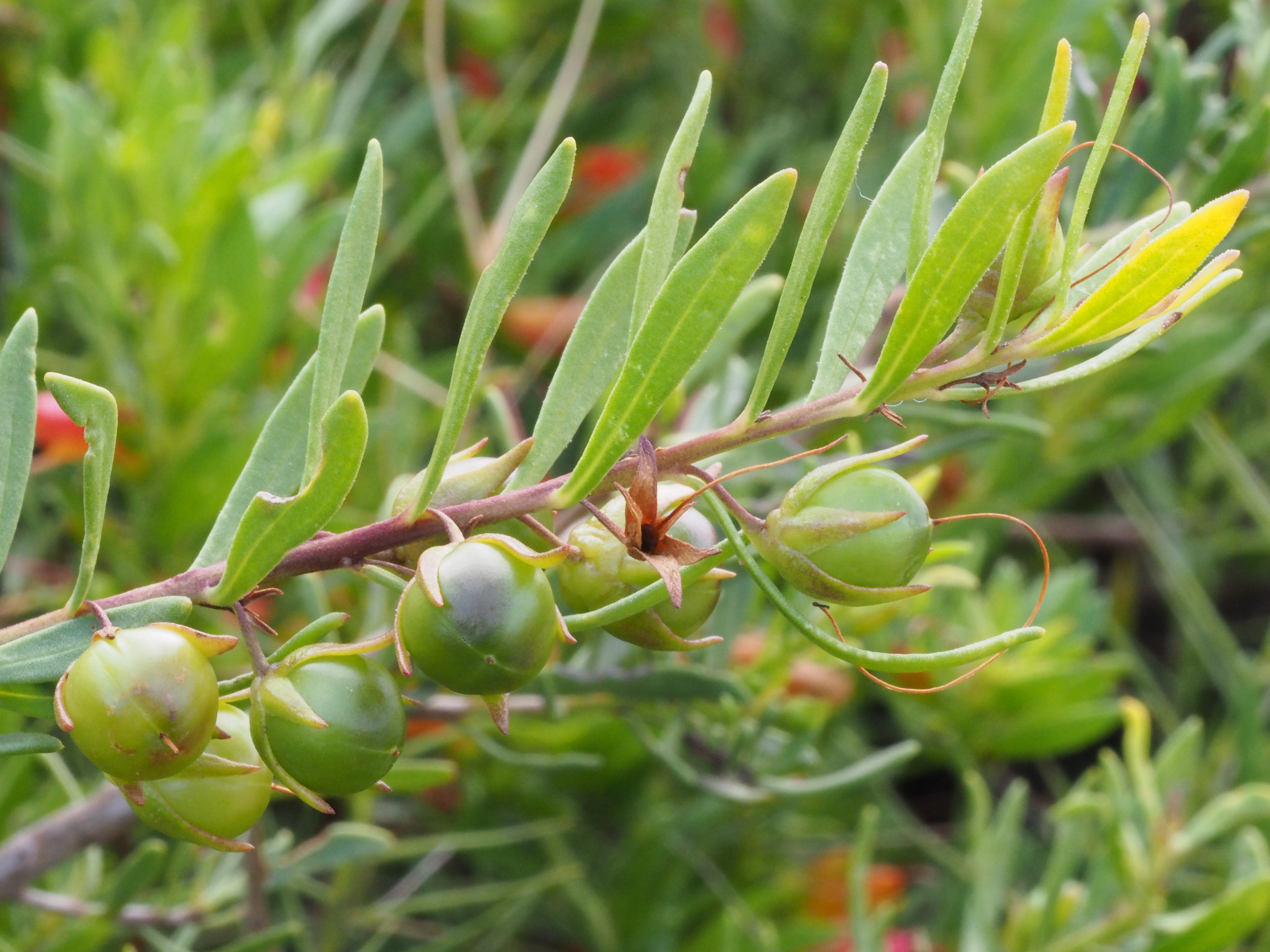
Fruit

== Taxonomy and naming ==
Eremophila glabra subsp. carnosa was first described in 2007 by Robert Chinnock in 2007.

== Distribution and habitat ==
Eremophila glabra subsp. carnosa occurs in coastal areas between Gregory and Leeman where it grows in sand near saline flats.
