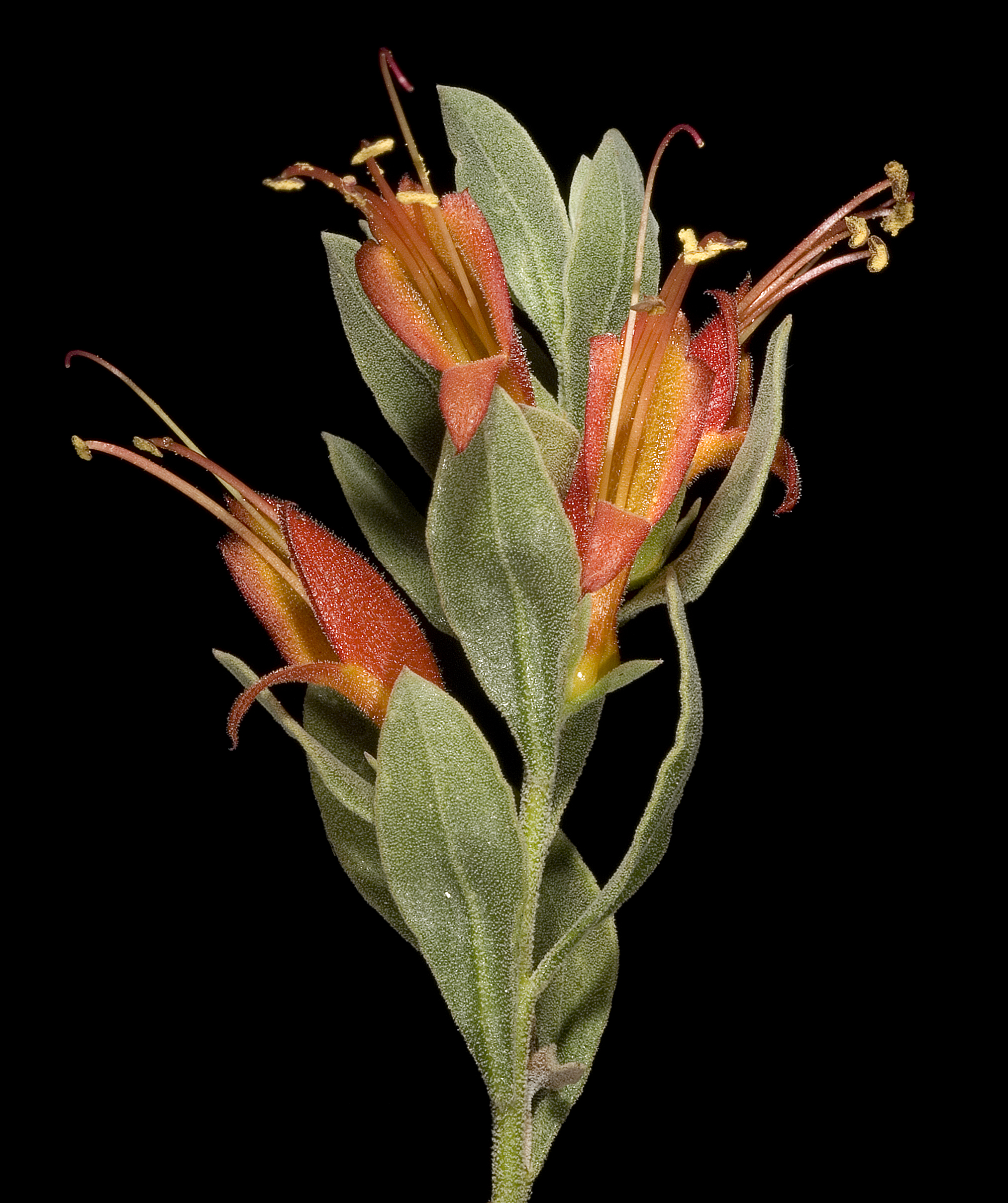

Scientific classification
- Kingdom: Plantae
- Clade: Tracheophytes
- Clade: Angiosperms
- Clade: Eudicots
- Clade: Asterids
- Order: Lamiales
- Family: Scrophulariaceae
- Genus: Eremophila
- Species: E. glabra (R.Br.) Ostenf.
- Subspecies: E. g. subsp. glabra

Trinomial name
- Eremophila glabra subsp. glabra

= Eremophila glabra subsp. glabra =

Subspecies of flowering plant

Eremophila glabra subsp. glabra, commonly known as common emu bush, is a plant in the figwort family, Scrophulariaceae and is endemic to the mainland states of Australia. It is similar to other shrubs in the species Eremophila glabra but it distinguished from them by the pattern of fine hairs on the stems. It is found in the drier parts of the continent, including to the west of the Great Dividing Range in the eastern states.

== Description ==
Eremophila glabra subsp. glabra is a shrub varying in size but in the range 0.5–3 metres (2–10 ft) high, sometimes spreading to 4 metres (10 ft) wide. The stems are covered with fine white hairs, except for a strip underneath the leaf attachment, so that the hairs are in bands down the stems interspersed with glabrous bands. The leaves are scattered and spreading, elliptic to lance shaped with the narrower end towards the base, 15–58 millimetres (0.6–2 in) long and 2.5–12 millimetres (0.1–0.5 in) wide.

The flowers are red or orange, sometimes yellow and occur singly in the leaf axils on flower stalks 4.5–7 millimetres (0.2–0.3 in) long. There are 5 partly overlapping sepals which are narrow triangular to egg shaped and 5 petals forming a tube except at the ends where the lowest lobe is thinner that the rest and is turned back below the flower. Flowering occurs from January to November and is followed by fruits which are oval to almost spherical and 6.6–9 millimetres (0.3–0.4 in) in diameter.

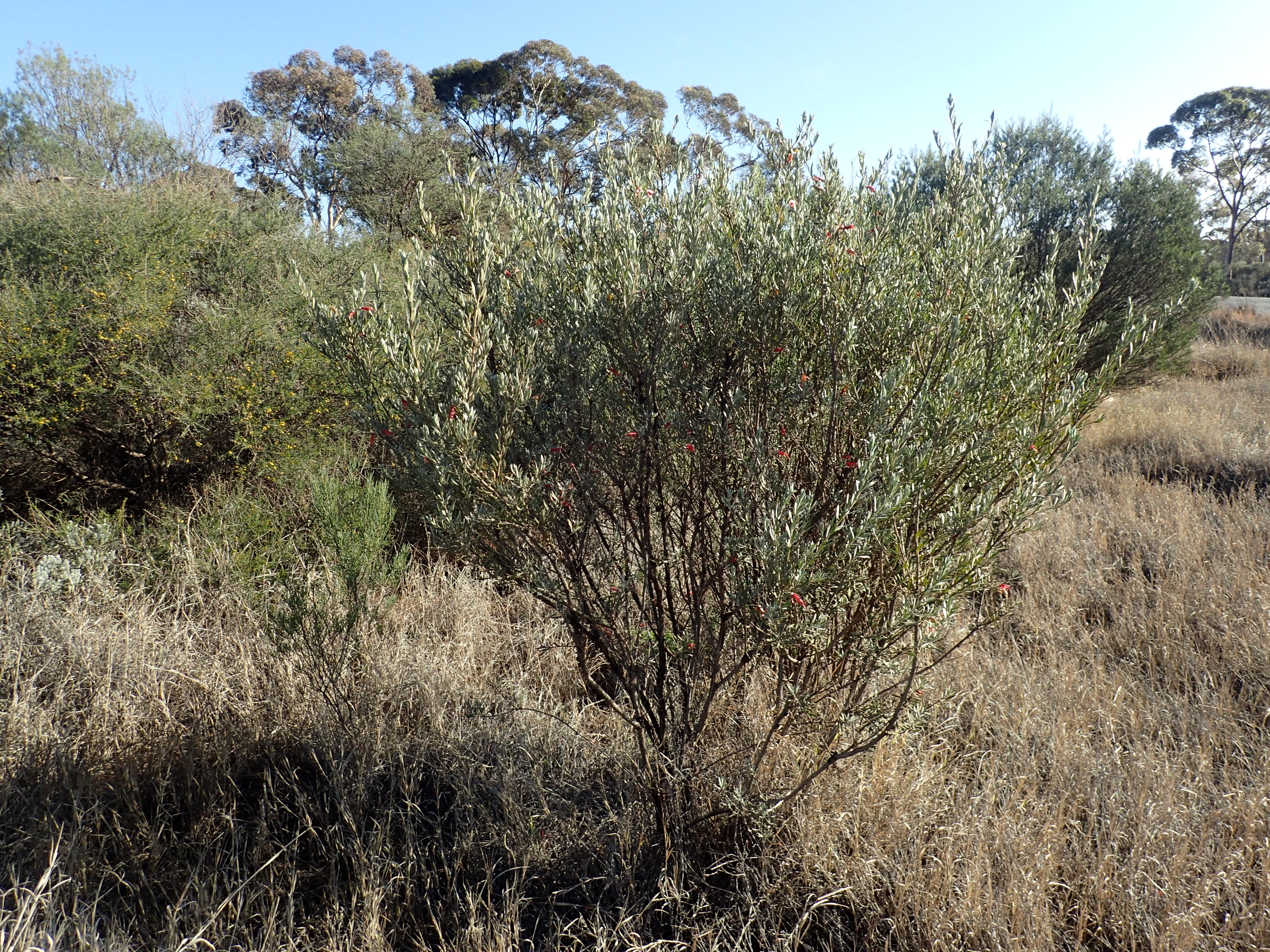
Near Kalgoorlie

== Taxonomy and naming ==
Eremophila glabra subsp. glabra is an autonym and therefore the taxonomy is the same as for Eremophila glabra.

== Distribution and habitat ==
Eremophila glabra subsp. glabra occurs in every mainland state of Australia, including the drier inland parts of New South Wales, southern Queensland and Victoria. It is found throughout South Australia and in the southern half of the Northern Territory and Western Australia. It grows in a wide range of soils and vegetation associations.
