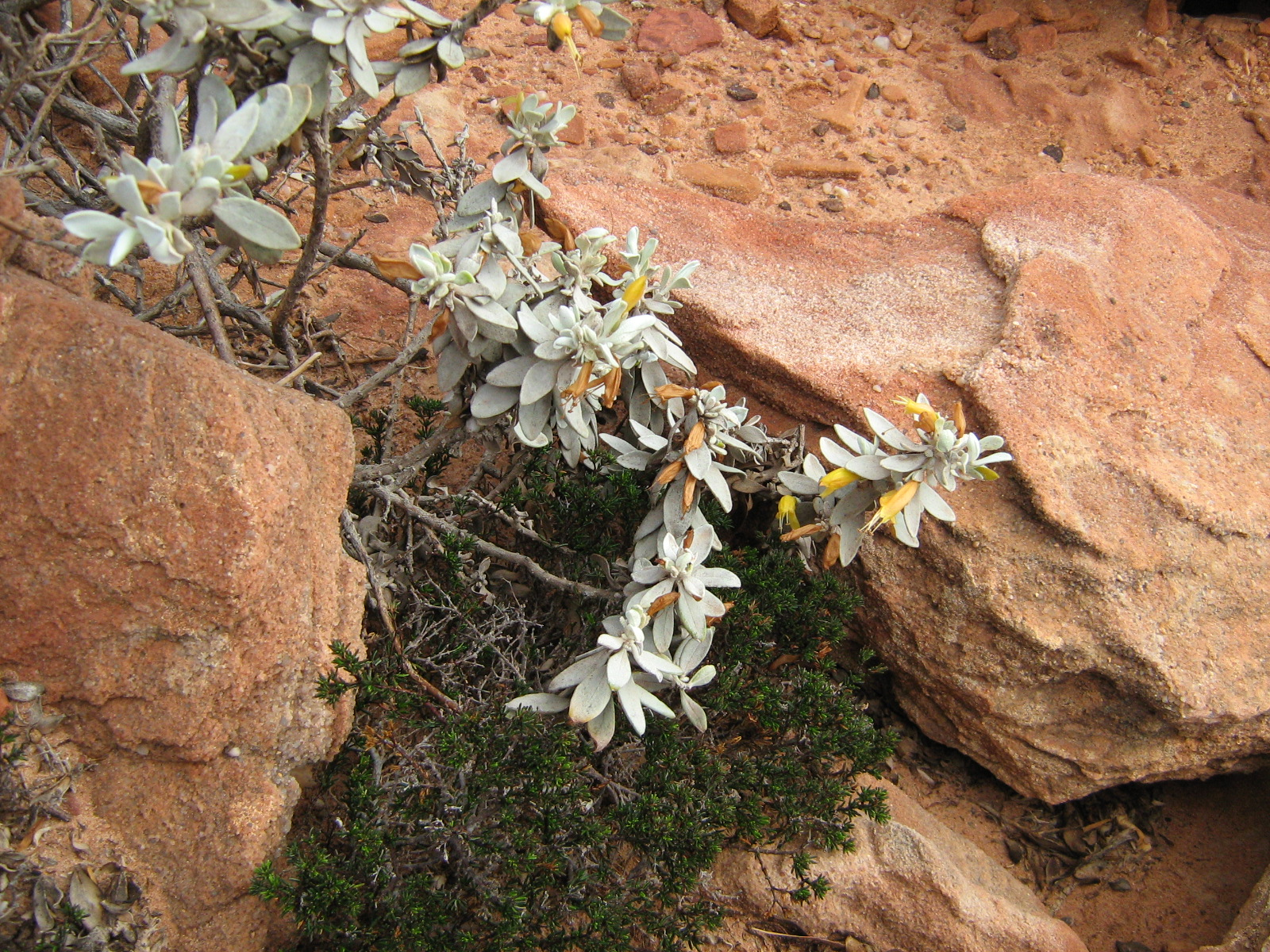
- Near Kalbarri

Scientific classification
- Kingdom: Plantae
- Clade: Tracheophytes
- Clade: Angiosperms
- Clade: Eudicots
- Clade: Asterids
- Order: Lamiales
- Family: Scrophulariaceae
- Genus: Eremophila
- Species: E. glabra
- Subspecies: E. g. subsp. albicans

Trinomial name
- Eremophila glabra subsp. albicans (Bartl.) Chinnock

= Eremophila glabra subsp. albicans =

Subspecies of flowering plant

Eremophila glabra subsp. albicans is a plant in the figwort family, Scrophulariaceae and is endemic to Western Australia. It is similar to other shrubs in the species Eremophila glabra but it distinguished from them by its usually grey, felty leaves, dull yellow, orange or red flowers with hairy sepals, growing in sandy soils on dunes and limestone outcrops between Bunbury and Shark Bay.

== Description ==
Eremophila glabra subsp. albicans is a low, spreading, sometimes straggly shrub up to 0.4 metres (1 ft) high, sometimes spreading to 2 metres (7 ft) wide. The stems are usually scurfy or hairy and the leaves are grey due to a covering of fine hairs. The leaves are elliptic to lance-shaped, 15–30 millimetres (0.6–1 in) long and 4–7 millimetres (0.2–0.3 in) wide.

The flowers are dull yellow, orange or red and occur singly in the leaf axils on flower stalks 1.5–5 millimetres (0.06–0.2 in) long. There are 5 partly overlapping sepals which are narrow triangular to lance-shaped and 5 petals forming a tube except at the ends where the lowest lobe is thinner that the rest and is turned back below the flower. Flowering occurs from May to January and is followed by fruit which are oval-shaped and 5–6 millimetres (0.2–0.2 in) long.

== Taxonomy and naming ==
Eremophila glabra subsp. albicans was first described in 1845 by Friedrich Gottlieb Bartling who gave it the name Stenochilus albicans and published the description in Plantae Preissianae. The type was collected by Bartling near Fremantle. It was reduced to a subspecies of Eremophila glabra by Robert Chinnock in 2007.

== Distribution and habitat ==
Eremophila glabra subsp. albicans occurs in coastal areas between Bunbury and Shark Bay where it grows in sandy soil on sand dunes and limestone outcrops.
