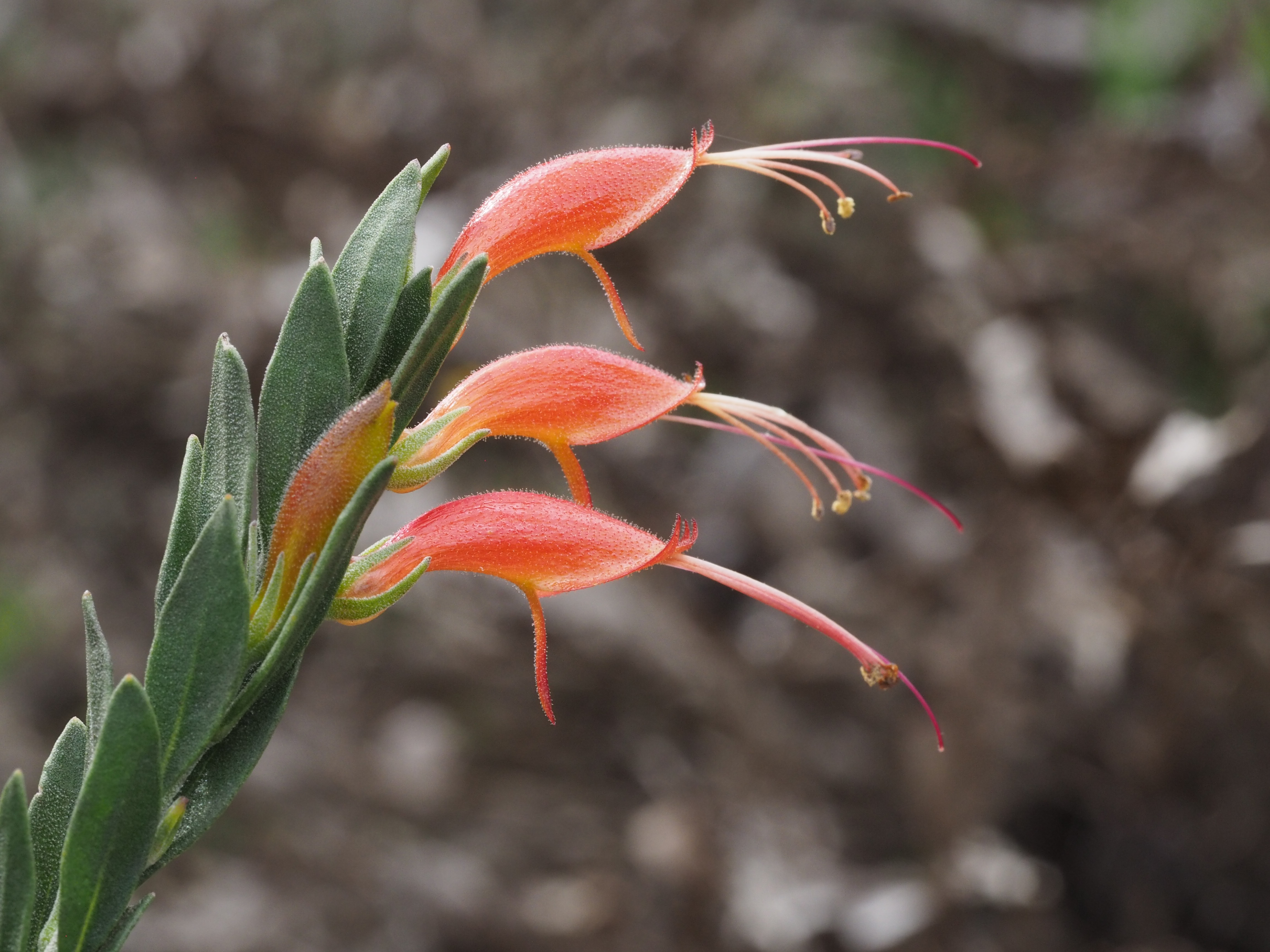
- Eremophila glabra subsp. South Coast, leaves and flowers

Scientific classification
- Kingdom: Plantae
- (unranked): Angiosperms
- (unranked): Eudicots
- (unranked): Asterids
- Order: Lamiales
- Family: Scrophulariaceae
- Genus: Eremophila
- Species: E. glabra
- Subspecies: E. g. subsp. South Coast

Trinomial name
- Eremophila glabra subsp. South Coast

= Eremophila glabra subsp. South Coast =

Subspecies of flowering plant

Eremophila glabra subsp. South Coast is a plant in the figwort family, Scrophulariaceae and is endemic to Western Australia. It is similar to other shrubs in the species Eremophila glabra but is distinguished from them mainly by the outer surface of its petal tube, which is covered with glandular hairs. It has not been formally described but is a distinct subspecies, restricted to the Ravensthorpe district.

== Description ==
Eremophila glabra subsp. South Coast is an erect, open shrub growing to 0.5–3 metres (2–10 ft) high. The leaves are grey-green and hairy, sometimes with a few indistinct teeth near their tips. The leaves are 10–20 millimetres (0.4–0.8 in) long and 4–8 millimetres (0.2–0.3 in) wide.

The flowers are yellow, orange or reddish-orange and occur singly in the leaf axils. They have 5 slightly overlapping sepals which are narrow lance-shaped, 4–9 millimetres (0.2–0.4 in) long and 1–4 millimetres (0.04–0.2 in) wide. The 5 petals form a tube 20–25 millimetres (0.8–1 in) long which is covered on its outer surface by glandular hairs. The lowest petal lobe is narrower that the rest and is turned back below the flower. Flowering occurs from August to December.

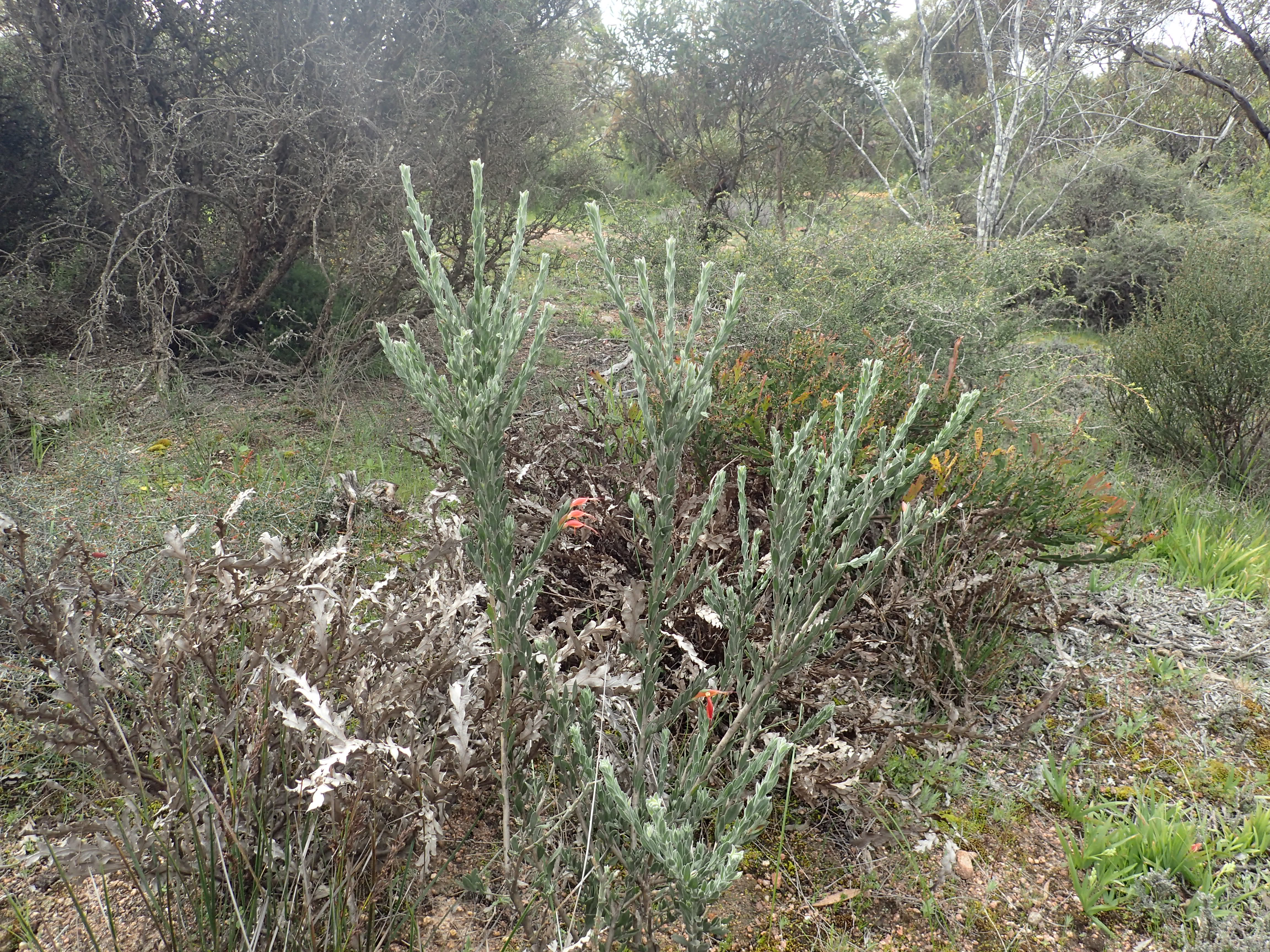
E. glabra subsp. South Coast growing near Ravensthorpe

== Taxonomy and naming ==
Eremophila glabra subsp. South Coast has not been formally described.

== Distribution and habitat ==
Eremophila glabra subsp. South Coast is only known from the Ravensthorpe area where it grows in red-brown clay soil.
