= Bevan Buirchell =

Australian botanist (born 1951)

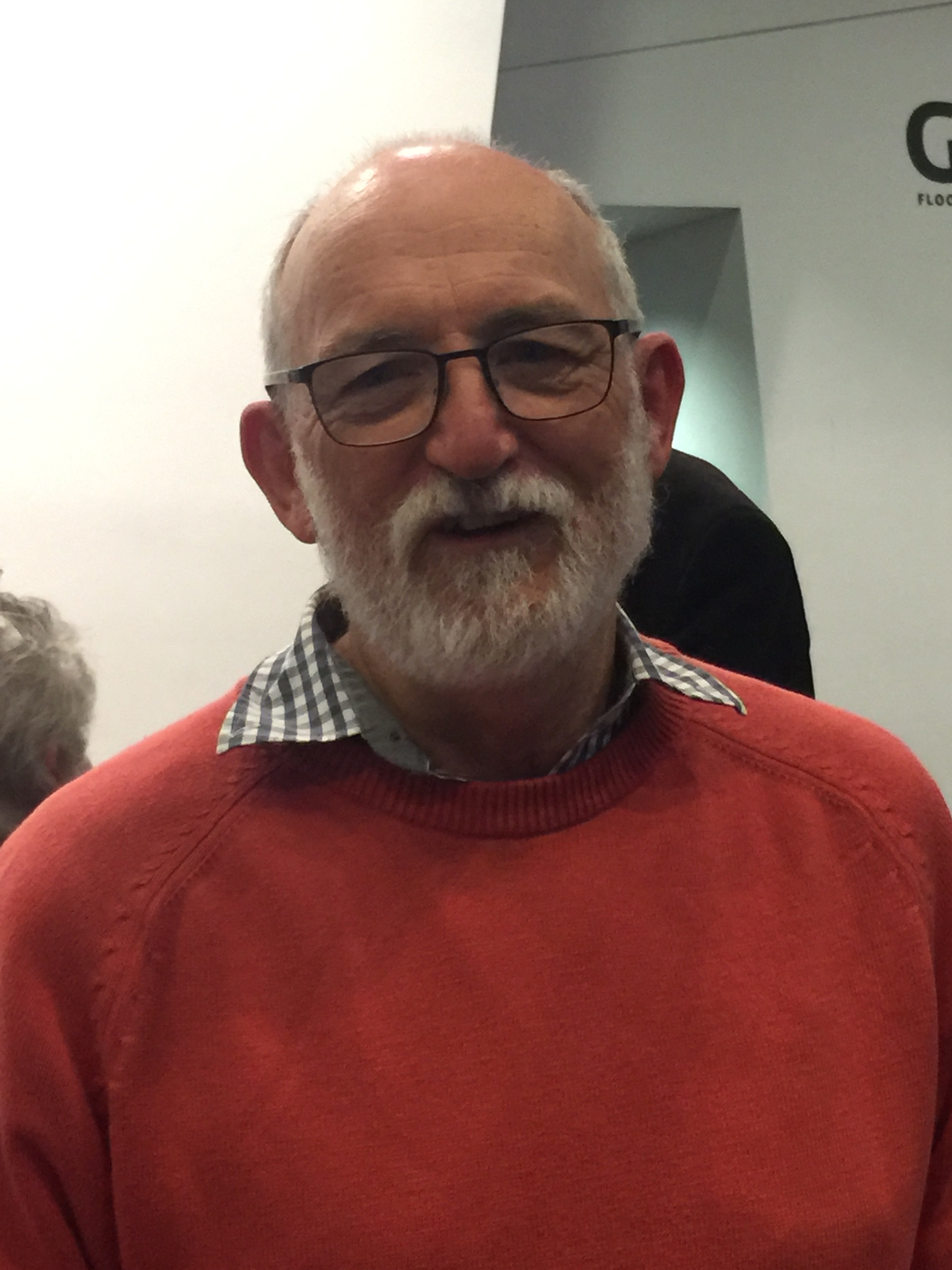
- Buirchell in 2019
- Born: 1951 (age 73–74)
- Scientific career
- Fields: botany
- Author abbrev. (botany): Buirchell

Bevan John Buirchell (born 1951) is an Australian botanist. He graduated from The University of Western Australia and obtained his PhD in biochemistry in 1982. In 1988, he began working on lupins as an agricultural crop, first as a research officer and later as Senior Lupin Breeder in the Western Australian Department of Agriculture. He has used molecular markers, especially markers for disease resistance, in breeding programs and was part of a team that tagged 9,000 locations on the lupin genome.

He has co-authored papers on the subject of lupins, a book on the orchids of Western Australia and a Field Guide to the Eremophilas of Western Australia.
