= WAGR X class =

Australian diesel-electric locomotive class

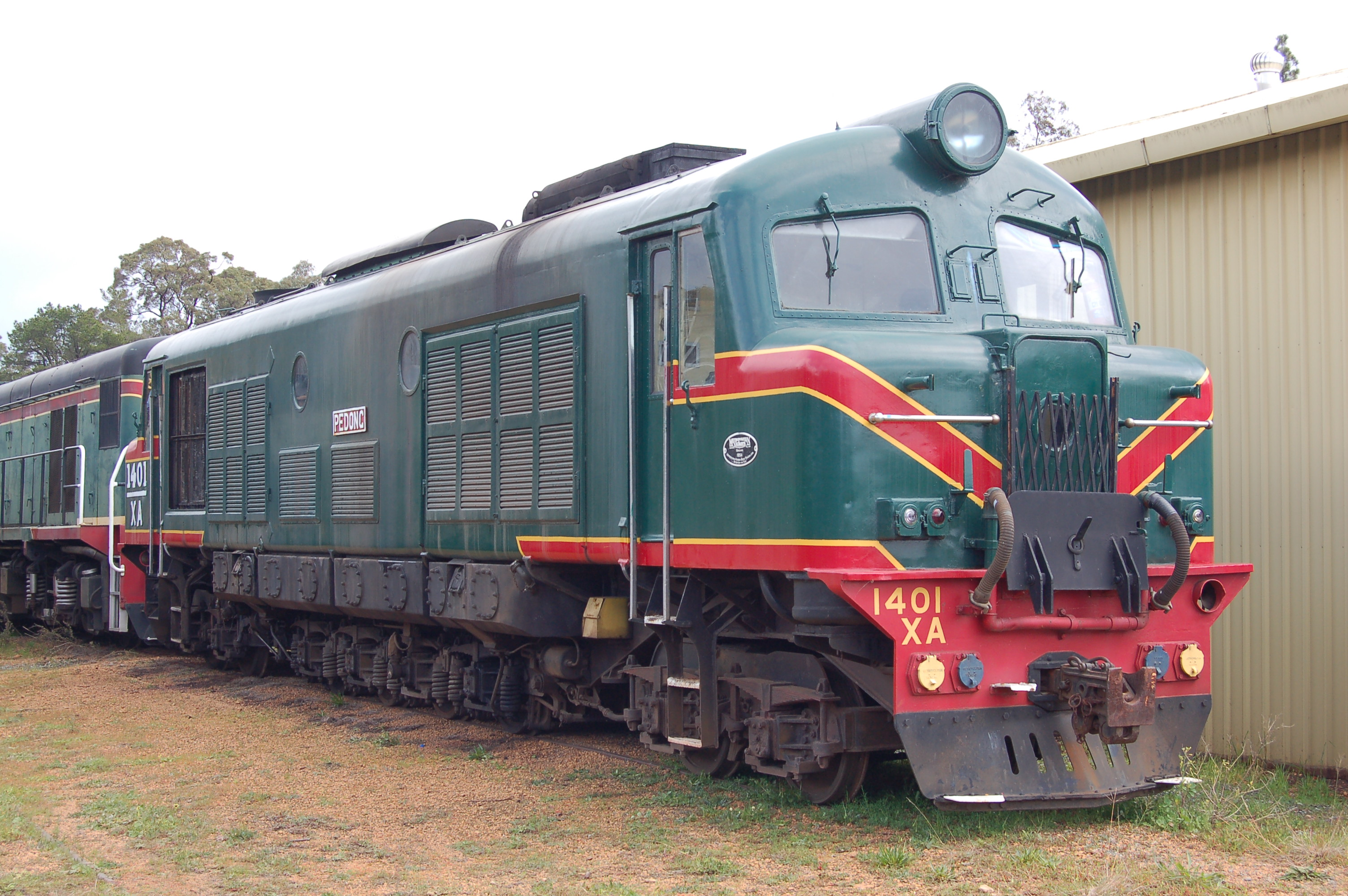
- Preserved XA 1401 at the Hotham Valley Railway in July 2011
Type and origin
- Power type: Diesel-electric
- Builder: Beyer, Peacock & Company; Metropolitan-Vickers
- Serial number: 830–877
- Build date: 1954–1956
- Total produced: 48
Specifications
- Configuration
  - UIC: 2′Do2′
- Gauge: 1,067 mm (3 ft 6 in)
- Length: 14.63 m (48 ft 0 in)
- Loco weight: 80 t (79 long tons; 88 short tons)
- Fuel type: Diesel
- Prime mover: Crossley HST-Vee8
- Engine type: Two-stroke V8 diesel
- Aspiration: Exhaust pulse-charged
- Generator: MV TG4203
- Traction motors: MV136
- Cylinders: 8
Performance figures
- Maximum speed: 89 km/h (55 mph)
- Power output: 779 kW (1,045 bhp)
Career
- Operators: Western Australian Government Railways
- Number in class: 48
- Numbers: X 1001–X 1032; XA 1401–XA 1416
- Nicknames: Hummingbirds; Submarines
- First run: 4 May 1954
- Retired: 31 March 1988
- Preserved: X 1001; XA 1401; XA 1402; XA 1405; XA 1411; XA 1415
- Disposition: 6 preserved, remainder scrapped

The WAGR X class is a now-withdrawn class of diesel locomotives built by Beyer, Peacock & Company and Metropolitan-Vickers, Bowesfield Works, Stockton-on-Tees for the Western Australian Government Railways (WAGR) between 1954 and 1956. Several members of the class have been preserved.

== Construction ==
In the early 1950s the Western Australian Government Railways placed the largest single Australian order for diesel locomotives, when it ordered 48 2-Do-2 locomotives from Beyer, Peacock & Company and Metropolitan-Vickers. All were delivered between 1954 and 1956.

The seeds for the construction of the class were laid in by the then WAGR Chief Mechanical Engineer, Tom Marsland, with a proposal for the acquisition of 87 diesel locomotives, including 3 small jetty shunters, 18 diesel shunters and 66 mainline locomotives, later reduced to 48 when railcars were selected for suburban service. The proposal developed further during discussions with Beyer, Peacock regarding issues with the design of the W Class locomotive.

== Operation ==
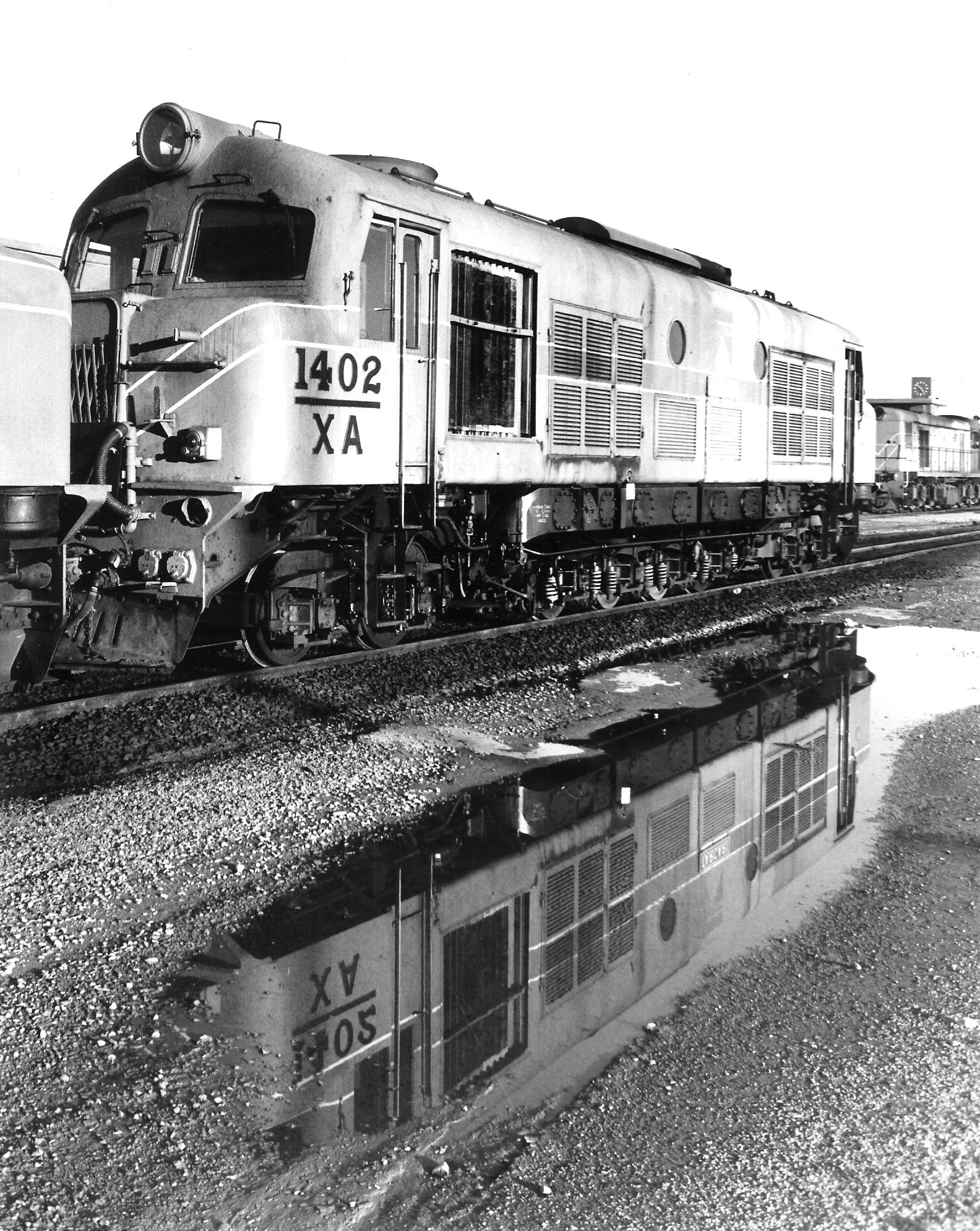
XA 1402 at Forrestfield Marshalling Yard in August 1987

The X class revolutionised operations on the WAGR. Their light axle load of less than 10 tons meant they could travel on all lines, and the dual cab arrangement eliminated the need for turning. They were quickly allocated to express passenger trains including the Albany Express, Australind, Kalgoorlie Express and The Westland. Although considered as good runners, the eight driving wheels being attached to the rigid main frame caused these locomotives to ride roughly.

== The Crossley engine ==
At the time of construction, the HST-V8 was an untested concept, though the engine itself was an evolution of a design used successfully in patrol boats during World War II. One line of thought is the motor was an evolution of either of the HRN8 marine diesel, or the HRP8 stationary diesel.

The engines used Crossley's system of exhaust pulse pressure charging and developed 1,200 horsepower (895 kW) at 625 rpm, though in 1981 they were down-rated to 875 hp at 600 rpm. There were no valves, and inlet and exhaust were via ports in the cylinder walls.

Failures commenced within weeks of the first locomotives being unveiled. It was only the skill of staff at WAGR's Midland Railway Workshops that saved the day. In their early days, availability was less than for steam.

The engines burnt and leaked oil, had underfed bearings, vibrated and popped heads and pistons, and suffered from ring scuffing for most of their lives. It was only the engineering excellence, and perseverance of Midland Railway Workshops staff that kept the locomotives operating, and performance improving. In the end, over 600 design faults, mainly in the Crossley engine, were overcome. One of the strategies used to minimise problems was to de-rate the engine to 1045 hp (officially quoted as 1000 hp).

Rumours persisted that the engine was either war surplus, or formerly from a sub-maritime application. Neither of these are correct, despite some publications suggesting this. The myth may have arisen from Crossley's success in delivering robust engines for marine and other modes of transport. Experience in Western Australia with both Metropolitan Vickers and Crossley engines was otherwise positive. It has been noted that the Irish Railways (CIÉ), through the respected Engineer Oliver Bulleid, had "heard" through the British Admiralty that the "Crossley unit gave no trouble".

The Smith Royal Commission into the class identified blind faith in the British manufacturers, and chided the WAGR for ignoring the advice of supervising engineers in the UK who reported problems with the diesel motor during testing. Whilst CIÉ re-engined their similarly powered Crossley 001 Class locomotives to rid themselves of the problem, The Smith Royal Commission recommended against rebuilding, proposing that the entire class be replaced wholesale. To be fair to the WAGR, they were not the only ones that rushed into buying unproven traction: British Railways also did the same, buying many different types of diesel locomotives from many different manufacturers in their haste to dieselise, including purchasing the unsuccessful Class 28 Co-Bo locomotives, which could be regarded as "first cousins" to the WAGR X class.

== Multiple unit working ==
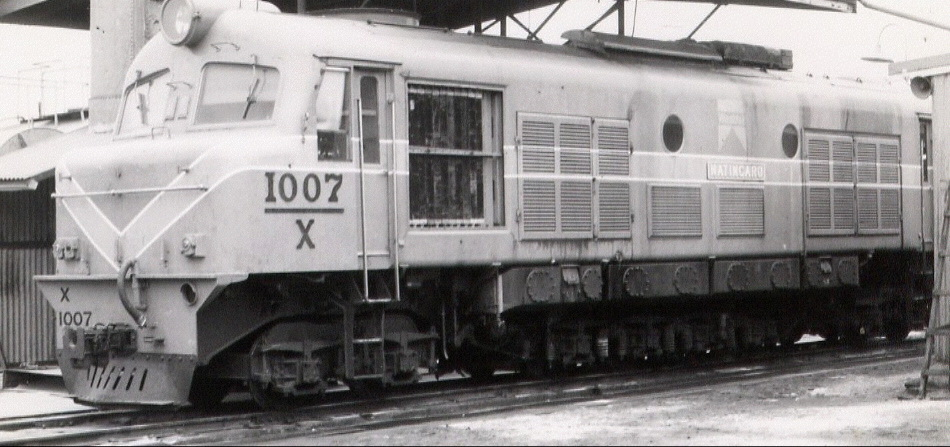
X 1007 in Bunbury

During construction, 16 locomotives were fitted with multiple unit control and denoted as XA class. These locomotives included communication doors at each end, and were numbered in a separate block starting from 1401.

From December 1963, Midland Workshops fitted 10 of the X class for multiple unit working, and these were reclassified as Xb class. Units so converted were not fitted with communication doors, and retained their original 10XX series numbers.

== Other modifications ==
Whilst the class were built with locomotive pneumatic braking and train vacuum braking systems, during 1969 and 1970 eight XA class (1402, 1403, 1406, 1408, 1409, 1410, 1413 and 1416) were modified to operate with dual vacuum/air braking systems manufactured by Davies and Metcalfe to allow them to operate air-braked salt traffic on the Esperance Branch. This equipment was removed in the early 1980s, only to be reinstalled in XA 1406 (October 1986) and XA 1403 (November 1986) to allow these units to haul hired Queensland Rail SX carriages on suburban services.

== End of career ==
In their final years, those still in service were reputed to have performed well. They ran grain trains in the South West as late as 1984, and provided power for trains following the reopening of the Fremantle line up to the last retirement in 1988.

The first were withdrawn in 1973, primarily as sources of spare parts. The last in service, XA1402 was withdrawn on 31 March 1988, after completing a transfer working.

The last to operate on the public network was XA1401, under the stewardship of Hotham Valley Railway, working a consist of sleeping cars back from Dowerin on 27 August 2004.

== Names ==
The locomotives carried the names of Indigenous language groups, leaders and warriors from around Australia. However, confusion at the time resulted in several duplications and irregular spellings. Within the WAGR, proposals were made to code the class as "T", and for the class to be known as the "Tribal class". This was not adopted.

Within the WAGR, the class earned the nickname "Hummingbirds" due their distinctive engine noise, while they were called "Submarines" by rail enthusiasts due to the widely circulated myth that they had submarine engines.

== Status list ==
The 48 locomotives were:

=== X Class ===
No.	Locomotive Name	Entered service	Converted to XB	Written Off	Status
1001	Yalagonga	8 March 1954		28 March 1983	Preserved by Rail Heritage WA, Bassendean on 7 April 1983
1002	Bibbulmun	20 April 1954		28 January 1983	Scrapped
1003	Ditu-Wonga	30 April 1954		12 February 1980	Scrapped
1004	Kadjerden	31 May 1954	15 July 1965	27 June 1983	Scrapped
1005	Meananger	26 June 1954		30 January 1985	Scrapped
1006	Nangamada	17 August 1954	27 February 1968	9 November 1985	Scrapped
1007	Natingaro	15 September 1954		30 March 1984	Scrapped
1008	Warrangoo	1 October 1954	12 December 1967	17 September 1985	Scrapped
1009	Arnga	9 December 1954		31 March 1980	Scrapped
1010	Arawodi	5 November 1954		29 May 1981	Scrapped
1011	Balgua	9 February 1954		31 March 1980	Scrapped
1012	Ballardong	14 December 1954		3 December 1982	Scrapped
1013	Boonara	23 December 1954		31 March 1980	Scrapped
1014	Churoro	11 February 1955		22 June 1983	Scrapped
1015	Cheangwa	11 February 1955		17 November 1976	Scrapped
1016	Djukin	11 February 1955		31 March 1980	Scrapped
1017	Ewenyoon	22 February 1955	15 May 1968	17 October 1986	Scrapped
1018	Inpirra	28 March 1955	20 February 1964	28 January 1986	Scrapped
1019	Ingarra	13 April 1955		31 March 1980	Scrapped
1020	Jargurdi	22 April 1955	16 December 1964	29 June 1983	Scrapped
1021	Jarroo	4 May 1955		30 March 1984	Scrapped
1022	Kardagur	1 June 1955	17 November 1967	9 November 1982	Scrapped
1023	Kariera	23 May 1955		8 of August 1984	Scrapped
1024	Kogara	26 May 1955	14 September 1966	27 March 1986	Scrapped
1025	Loonga	17 June 1955		30 June 1983	Scrapped
1026	Mangala	16 June 1955		9 November 1982	Scrapped
1027	Marangal	30 June 1955	29 March 1968	30 March 1984	Scrapped
1028	Meeraman	11 August 1955		30 June 1983	Scrapped
1029	Muliarra	8 July 1955		17 November 1976	Scrapped
1030	Mooroon	18 August 1955		9 December 1982	Scrapped
1031	Yauera	21 August 1956		28 January 1986	Scrapped
1032	Yeithi	19 September 1956	20 December 1963	31 March 1980	Scrapped

=== XA Class ===
No.	Locomotive Name	Entered service	Written Off	Status
1401	Pedong	30 September 1955	19 March 1987	Preserved by the Hotham Valley Railway in March 1989, currently operational at Dwellingup.
1402	Targari	7 October 1955	8 May 1988	Preserved by Rail Heritage WA, Bassendean on 20 April 1989
1403	Wanbiri	8 November 1955	8 May 1988	Scrapped, cab preserved at Gosnells Railway Markets
1404	Pardoo	11 November 1955	17 September 1985	Scrapped
1405	Warienga	9 December 1955	19 March 1987	Preserved by Rail Heritage WA on 19 July 1987
1406	Ungarinyin	22 November 1955	19 March 1987	Scrapped
1407	Wirngir	9 December 1955	25 February 1983	Scrapped
1408	Wolmeri	21 January 1956	1 July 1986	Scrapped
1409	Unambal	9 February 1956	9 December 1982	Scrapped
1410	Tenma	6 March 1956	9 November 1982	Scrapped
1411	Weedookarri	29 March 1956	8 May 1988	Preserved by the Hotham Valley Railway on 7 July 1989, currently stored at Pinjarra, used for parts
1412	Noala	14 May 1956	2 April 1985	Scrapped
1413	Yabaroo	13 June 1956	8 May 1988	Scrapped
1414	Yindi	28 June 1956	25 February 1983	Scrapped
1415	Wurara	12 July 1956	8 May 1988	Preserved by the Hotham Valley Railway in November 1989, loaned to Narrogin Apex Club (now defunct) in exchange for PM706 in 1990, currently on display at Narrogin railway station
1416	Niligara	16 July 1956	29 June 1984	Scrapped

== Preservation ==
One X class and five XA class locomotives have been preserved:

- X 1001 Yalagonga – Rail Heritage WA, Bassendean
- XA 1401 Pedong – Hotham Valley Railway, Dwellingup
- XA 1402 Targari – Rail Heritage WA, Bassendean
- XA 1405 Warienga – Rail Heritage WA, Bassendean
- XA 1411 Weedookarri – Hotham Valley Railway, Pinjarra
- XA 1415 Wurara – Narrogin (in place of Pm706 – on loan to Hotham Valley Railway)
