= Arnga =

Indigenous people of Western Australia

The Arnga are an Aboriginal Australian people of the northern Kimberley region of Western Australia.

== Name ==
The Arnga, like the Yeidji/Gwini and Miwa lack a self-defining tribal ethnonym, and for that reason have generally been called the Forrest River people. The name 'Arnga' means 'unintelligible person'.

== Country ==
Arnga country in Norman Tindale's estimation covered some 2,700 square miles (7,000 km^{2}) of the land south of the Forrest River. It included areas along the King and Pentecost rivers, running west of the Wyndham Gulf to the Durack River, Their inland extension was not deep, going only as far as the river gorges.

== Alternative names ==
- Arawari
- Arawodi
- Guluwarin
- Kolaia
- Kuluwara, Kuluwaran
- Molyamidi
- Woljamidi, Woljamiri
- ?Yamandil

Source: Tindale 1974, p. 239

== Sources ==
- Capell, Arthur (June 1940). "The Classification of Languages in North and North-West Australia (Continued)". Oceania. 10 (4): 404–433. doi:10.1002/j.1834-4461.1940.tb00304.x. JSTOR 40327866.
- Elkin, A. P. (June 1933). "Totemism in North-Western Australia". Oceania. 3 (4): 435–481. doi:10.1002/j.1834-4461.1933.tb01679.x. JSTOR 40327434.
- Kaberry, Phyllis M. (June 1935). "The Forrest River and Lyne River Tribes of North-West Australia: A Report on Field Work". Oceania. 5 (4): 408–436. doi:10.1002/j.1834-4461.1935.tb00163.x. JSTOR 40327811.
- McGregor, William B. (2013). The Languages of the Kimberley, Western Australia. Routledge. ISBN 978-1-134-39602-3.
- "Tindale Tribal Boundaries" (PDF). Department of Aboriginal Affairs, Western Australia. September 2016. Archived from the original (PDF) on 8 March 2016.
- Tindale, Norman Barnett (1974). "Arnga (WA)". Aboriginal Tribes of Australia: Their Terrain, Environmental Controls, Distribution, Limits, and Proper Names. Australian National University. ISBN 978-0-708-10741-6. Archived from the original on 14 March 2018.
- K37 Arnga at the Australian Indigenous Languages Database, Australian Institute of Aboriginal and Torres Strait Islander Studies
