= Miwa people =

Indigenous Western Australian people

The Miwa are an Aboriginal Australian people of the Kimberley region of Western Australia.

== Name ==
Miwa in this area of the Kimberley region is used in the sense of "salt water/sea", indicating peoples near or on the coast. Three different groups, among them the Yeidji, have been called Miwa in this broader sense. Likewise the Ngarinjin called the Gija, Miwa. In this article the word describes the Miya associated with the King Edward River zone specified below.

== Country ==
In Norman Tindale's estimation, the Miya lands extended over 2,200 square miles (5,700 km^{2}). On the coast they lay about the eastern side of Napier Broome Bay, the lower King Edward River and eastwards to about Cape Bernier. Their inland extension reached as far as the vicinity of Mount Connelly, the Drysdale River and the Barton Plain. It also took in an area of the King George River and Manungu, the Miya name for the range at the headwaters of the Berkeley River. The Miwa were often subsumed, together with the Wirngir, under a larger ethnonym, Walar.

== Alternative names ==
- Konun, Konan, Konin, Gonin
- Kaianu, Kianu, Kyanoo
- Murgura (eastern Miwa horde)
- Kuna
- Kunange, Gunan, Koonange
- Mande, Manda
- Pago (toponym at old Drysdale Mission)
- Bagu, Ba:gu
- Manungu, Manunggu (toponym)
- Galumburu (toponym at new Drysdale River Mission)
- Kalumbura, Caloombooroo
- Wulanggur (Cape Talbot peninsula toponym and horde name)
- Ulaqgu
- Wularjgu (Ngarinjin exonym)
- Ulangu
- Umari (King George River toponym)
- Pela
- Boola
- Pelange?
- Walar (snake clan's name)

== Sources ==
- "AIATSIS map of Indigenous Australia". AIATSIS. 14 May 2024.
- "Tindale Tribal Boundaries" (PDF). Department of Aboriginal Affairs, Western Australia. September 2016.
- Elkin, A. P. (March 1933a). "Totemism in North-Western Australia: (The Kimberley Division)". Oceania. 3 (3): 257–296. doi:10.1002/j.1834-4461.1933.tb00074.x. JSTOR 40327417.
- Elkin, A. P. (June 1933b). "Totemism in North-Western Australia". Oceania. 3 (4): 435–481. doi:10.1002/j.1834-4461.1933.tb01679.x. JSTOR 40327434.
- Tindale, Norman Barnett (1974). "Miwa (WA)". Aboriginal Tribes of Australia: Their Terrain, Environmental Controls, Distribution, Limits, and Proper Names. Australian National University. ISBN 978-0-708-10741-6. Archived from the original on 20 March 2020.
