= Mirning language =

Australian Aboriginal language

Mirning
- Ngandatha
- Native to: Australia
- Region: Western Australia
- Ethnicity: Mirning, ?Murunitja
- Native speakers: 4 (2005)
- Language family: Pama–Nyungan: Mirning languages; Mirning

Language codes
- ISO 639-3: gmr
- Glottolog: mirn1245
- AIATSIS: A9
- ELP: Mirniny
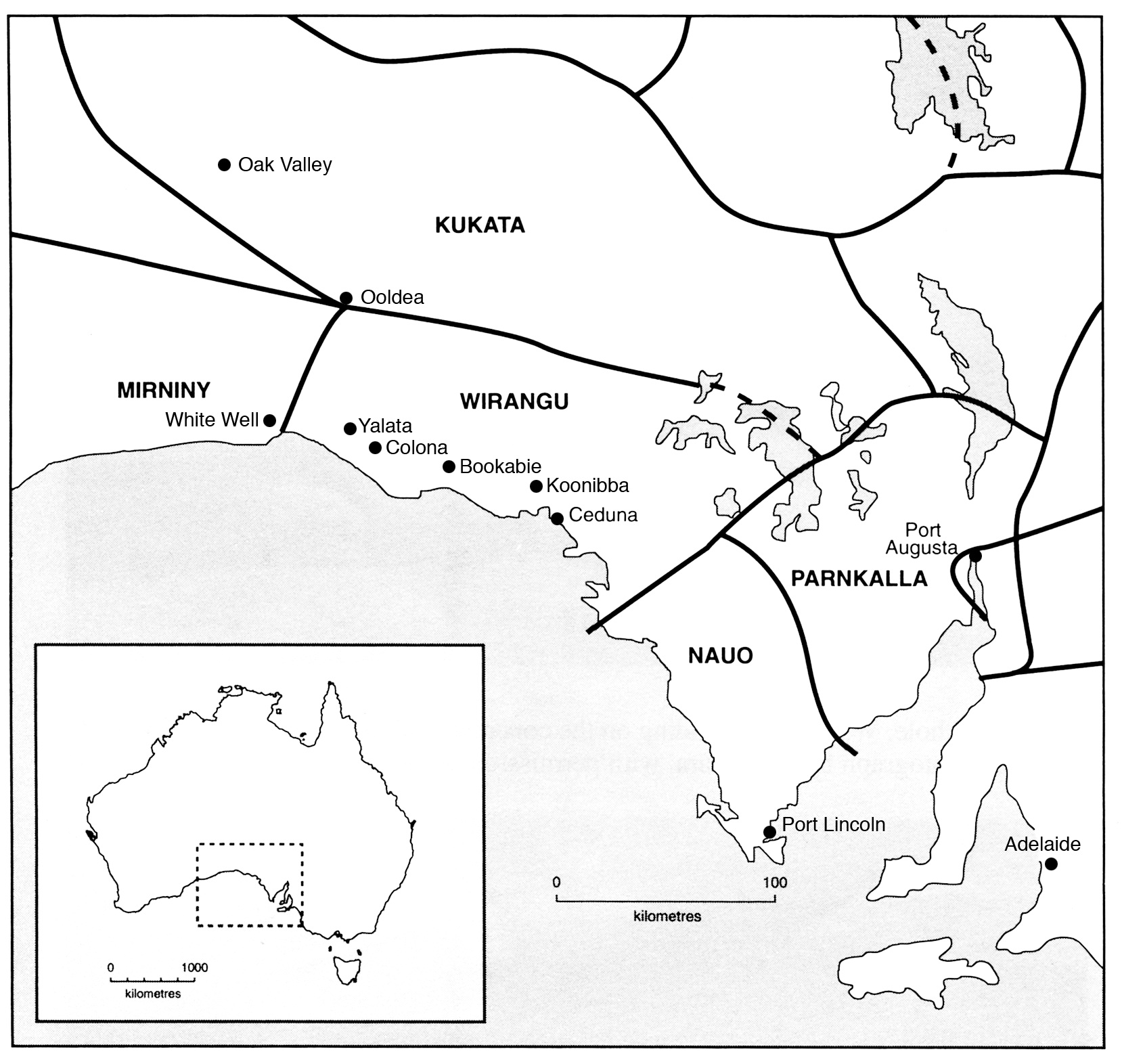
- Languages of South Australia.

Mirning (Mirniny) is a Pama–Nyungan language of Western Australia.

Murunitja was apparently a dialect of either Mirning or of its sister language Ngadjunmaya.

== Phonology ==
=== Consonants ===
	Peripheral		Laminal		Apical	
	Labial	Velar	Dental	Palatal	Alveolar	Retroflex
Plosive	p	k	c~t̪		t	ʈ
Nasal	m	ŋ		ɲ	n	ɳ
Rhotic					ɾ	
Lateral				ʎ	l	ɭ
Approximant	w			j		ɻ

/c/ may also occur as a dental stop [t̪] among speakers.

=== Vowels ===
	Front	Central	Back
High	i iː		u uː
Low		a aː	

/a/ may also range to a back vowel [ɑ].

== See also ==
- Kalarko–Mirniny language
