= Central New South Wales languages =

Group of Australian Aboriginal languages

Central New South Wales
- Central NSW, Central Inland NSW
- (geographic)
- Geographic distribution: New South Wales
- Linguistic classification: Pama–Nyungan: Central New South Wales
- Subdivisions: Wiradhuric; Dyangadi; Worimi; Muruwarri; Barranbinja

Language codes
- Glottolog: None

The Central New South Wales languages (Central NSW) are a largely geographic grouping of Australian Aboriginal languages within the traditional Pama–Nyungan family, partially overlapping the Kuri subgroup of the Yuin–Kuric languages.

The languages most often included are:

- Wiradhuric (Wiradhuri, Ngiyambaa, Gamilaraay)
- Dyangadi (Dyangadi, Nganyaywana)
- Worimi (Worimi, Awabakal)
- Muruwarri
- Barranbinja

Bowern and Atkinson use the term Central NSW to group the Wiradhuric languages with Muruwaric. Elsewhere it is known as Central Inland NSW.
