= Yeidji =

Indigenous people of Western Australia

The Yeidji, also spelt Yiiji and other variants, commonly known as Gwini or Kwini, are an Aboriginal Australian people of the Kimberley area of Western Australia, who also self-identify as Balanggarra. (Note: Balanggarra means “one mob together for country.” Our old people gave this name to our claim for our gra, our country. This Country has been our home for many thousands of years. Our old people did not just talk one language, or call themselves by one name; there different names that tell us where our old people came from and what language they talked in that country. Gwini is a main name we use, it really means ‘east’ and is the name we use today for all the people from Kalumburu right down to Oombulgurri but there are other names for the people and country too like Argna, Arawari, Barang-ngala, Yura and Gular,')

== Name ==
In contemporary accounts, the Yeidji are often called Gwini, also spelt Kwini, people. Norman Tindale, writing in 1974, maintained that Gwini was a directional term meaning "easterners" used by inlanders. The other term, Kujini means those in the coastal lowlands. There is no clear tribal name for several peoples in this area, and some confusion in the nomenclature and the several tribes, including also the Miwa are generally referred to as the Forrest River people, who, however are occasionally referred to as the Gwini/Yeidji. (Note: 'The tribes on the Forrest River have no common name, but may be collectively called by the name of the southernmost Gwi:ni.')

== Country ==
The Yeidji, according to Norman Tindale, controlled some 1,000 square miles (2,600 km^{2}) of tribal territory, running from the coast of Cambridge Gulf along the Forrest River as far as the Milligan ranges. Its southern extension touched Steere Hills. The northernmost boundary lay at Mount Carty and the Lyne River. Their neighbours were the Wilawila to the west, the Wenamba to the northwest, the Wirngir to the east, and the Arnga on their southern border. The Guragona horde, though classified as a subgroup of the Wenamba, may have been a section of the Yeidji.

Today they are the traditional owners by succession of Sir Graham Moore Island, off the Kimberley coast. Oral histories and archaeological excavations reveal evidence of interactions with Makassan traders from the 18th century onwards.

== Language ==
Yiiji is a dialect of Wunambal.

== Alternative names ==
- Yiiji
- Yeidji, Yeithi, Yeidthee, Yeeji, Yedji, Jeidji, Jeithi
- Gwi:ni, Gwini, Kuini ("easterners")
- Kujini, Gu:jini, Kuini, Gujini
- Ombalkari (toponym east of the Forrest River Mission)
- Umbalgari
- Miwu (perhaps a name for the language)
- Miwadange ("saltwater people")
- Waringnari, Waringari (a pejorative exonym suggesting the practice of cannibalism)
- Morokorei (Forrest River horde)
- Wunambal
- Pikkolatpan
- Bugay
- Worrorran

== Sources ==
- "K32:Yiiji". AIATSIS. 26 July 2019.
- "Balanggarra Healthy Country Plan 2012-2022" (PDF). Balanggarra Aboriginal Corporation. 2011.
- "Tindale Tribal Boundaries" (PDF). Department of Aboriginal Affairs, Western Australia. September 2016. Archived from the original (PDF) on 8 March 2016.
- Capell, Arthur (June 1939). "Mythology in Northern Kimberley, North-West Australia". Oceania. 9 (4): 382–404. doi:10.1002/j.1834-4461.1939.tb00246.x. JSTOR 40327760.
- Capell, Arthur (June 1940). "The Classification of Languages in North and North-West Australia (Continued)". Oceania. 10 (4): 404–433. doi:10.1002/j.1834-4461.1940.tb00304.x. JSTOR 40327866.
- Elkin, A. P. (June 1933). "Totemism in North-Western Australia". Oceania. 3 (4): 435–481. doi:10.1002/j.1834-4461.1933.tb01679.x. JSTOR 40327434.
- Kaberry, Phyllis M. (June 1935). "The Forrest River and Lyne River Tribes of North-West Australia: A Report on Field Work". Oceania. 5 (4): 408–436. doi:10.1002/j.1834-4461.1935.tb00163.x. JSTOR 40327811.
- McGregor, William B. (2013). The Languages of the Kimberley, Western Australia. Routledge. ISBN 978-1-134-39602-3.
- Tindale, Norman Barnett (1974). "Jeidji (WA)". Aboriginal Tribes of Australia: Their Terrain, Environmental Controls, Distribution, Limits, and Proper Names. Australian National University. ISBN 978-0-708-10741-6. Archived from the original on 20 March 2020.
