= Koolyanobbing, Western Australia =

Koolyanobbing
- Town
- Interactive map of Koolyanobbing
- Coordinates: 30.82°S 119.52°E
- Country: Australia
- State: Western Australia
- LGA: Shire of Yilgarn
- Location: 424 km (263 mi) east of Perth; 54 km (34 mi) north north east of Southern Cross
- Established: 1965

Government
  - State electorate: Central Wheatbelt
  - Federal division: O'Connor

Area
  - Total: 527.6 km^{2} (203.7 sq mi)
- Elevation: 343 m (1,125 ft)

Population
  - Total: 93 (SAL 2021)
- Postcode: 6427

Koolyanobbing is located in the Shire of Yilgarn, Western Australia, 54 km (34 mi) north-northeast of the town of Southern Cross. Iron ore has been mined there since 1948 by a series of companies, with a break between 1983 and 1993, and since 2024. Most recently, the ore was mined by Mineral Resources and railed to the port at Esperance for export.

== History ==
The place name Koolyanobbing is of local Aboriginal origin, meaning "place of large rocks" in the Kaalamaya language of the Kaprun people.

The first European to visit the area was Charles Cooke Hunt in 1864 who explored the Koolyanobbing range that is situated nearby.

The next European to visit the area, in 1887 and later in 1891, was a gold prospector named Henry Dowd, who thought that the rocks in the area were of no value. He recorded his findings and stored them in a bottle that was buried next to a survey peg and which was found again in 1963 at what is now known as Dowd Hill.

Iron ore was first mined at Koolyanobbing from 1948. It was sent by truck to Southern Cross from where it was shipped by rail to Wundowie, where there was a state-owned blast furnace.

The town was established to service a new iron ore mine in the 1960s at Dowd Hill. It was gazetted in 1965. Simultaneously, the former Eastern Goldfields Railway between Southern Cross and Kalgoorlie was realigned for change to standard gauge, and to service the Koolyanobbing mine. The new town site's facilities included a bowling green, general store, golf club, swimming pool and town hall.

Dampier Mining Co Ltd, a subsidiary of BHP, mined iron ore at Koolyanobbing between 1967 and 1983. The town's population peaked at nearly 500 in the early 1980s. Ore was shipped by rail to Kwinana, near Perth, to supply Australian Iron & Steel's (also a BHP subsidiary) blast furnace. The closure of the Kwinana blast furnace in 1982 resulted in suspension of iron ore mining at Koolyanobbing until 1993. Mining of iron ore was resumed at Koolyanobbing from 1993 by Portman Mining, with the ore being railed to Esperance for export. The operation was taken over by Cliffs Natural Resources in 2008.

In July 2018, Cliffs subsidiary Cliffs Asia Pacific Iron Ore sold the operation to Western Australian company Mineral Resources. There was a short break in production until November 2018 as the new owners took control under a five-year relief package, according to which the WA government waived millions of dollars in royalties to save hundreds of jobs. That package expired in February 2023, and in June 2024, Mineral Resources announced that its Yilgarn operations would close by the end of the year, as it was no longer "financially viable", even with further government assistance. Mining and haulage operations at Koolyanobbing were completed in early December and elsewhere just before Christmas; the final iron ore train arrived at Esperance during the last week of the year.

WA Salt Supply produces salt at Lake Deborah, 20 km (12 mi) to the north, which is railed from Koolyanobbing to Kwinana.

The Koolyanobbing Range supports many endemic, priority and one declared rare flora species.

== Rail services ==
Transwa's Prospector service, which runs each way between East Perth and Kalgoorlie once or twice each day, stops at Koolyanobbing.
