= Njakinjaki =

Indigenous people of Western Australia

The Njakinjaki (Nyaki Nyaki) are an indigenous Noongar people of southern Western Australia, in the Wheatbelt and Great Southern regions.

== Country ==
Njakinjaki traditional territory embraced some 12,000 square miles (31,000 km^{2}) of land. They were east of Lake Grace, at Newdegate, Mount Stirling, Bruce Rock, Kellerberrin, and Merredin. Their western frontier was through to Jitarning. Their southern reaches went as far as Lake King, and Mount Madden. The eastern boundaries ran along the area close to Lake Hope and Mount Holland.

== Language ==
Njakinjaki
- Nyaki Nyaki
- Native to: Australia
- Region: Western Australia
- Ethnicity: Njakinjaki
- Extinct: (date missing)
- Language family: Pama–Nyungan: Nyungic; Kalaamaya–Natingero? Noongar?; Kalaamaya?; Njakinjaki

Language codes
- ISO 639-3: –
- Glottolog: None
- AIATSIS: A1

The Njakinjaki language has been said to be a dialect of Noongar or of Kalaamaya.

=== Some words ===
- mamon (father)
- knockan (mother)
- dooda (tame dog)
- yokkine (wild dog)
- koolongnop (baby)
- jennok (white man)

== Sources ==
- "AIATSIS map of Indigenous Australia". AIATSIS. 28 July 2023.
- "Tindale Tribal Boundaries" (PDF). Department of Aboriginal Affairs, Western Australia. September 2016. Archived from the original (PDF) on 8 March 2016.
- Goldsworthy, Roger Tuckfield (1886). "Mt Stirling. Kokar Tribe" (PDF). In Curr, Edward Micklethwaite (ed.). The Australian race: its origin, languages, customs, place of landing in Australia and the routes by which it spread itself over the continent. Vol. 1. Melbourne: J. Ferres. pp. 384–385.
- Tindale, Norman Barnett (1974). "Njakinjaki (WA)". Aboriginal Tribes of Australia: Their Terrain, Environmental Controls, Distribution, Limits, and Proper Names. Australian National University. ISBN 978-0-708-10741-6. Archived from the original on 20 March 2020.
