= Galaagu language =

Pama–Nyungan language of Western Australia

Galaagu
- Kalarko
- Native to: Australia
- Region: Western Australia
- Ethnicity: Kalaako
- Extinct: (date missing)
- Language family: Pama–Nyungan: Nyungic; Galaagu

Language codes
- ISO 639-3: kba
- Glottolog: kala1379
- AIATSIS: A2

Galaagu, also spelled Kalarko and Kallaargu (and also known as Malpa), is a Pama–Nyungan language of Western Australia. It has recently been classified as the closest relative of the Nyungar languages.

== See also ==
- Kalarko–Mirniny language
- Mirning languages
