= Kalaamaya language =

Pama–Nyungan language of Western Australia

Kalaamaya
- Karlamay
- Native to: Australia
- Region: Western Australia
- Ethnicity: Kalamaia, Njakinjaki?
- Speakers: L2: 1 (2021) partial speakers (2021)
- Language family: Pama–Nyungan: Nyungic; Kalamaya–Natingero; Kalaamaya
- Dialects: Nyaki Nyaki?

Language codes
- ISO 639-3: lkm
- Glottolog: kala1401
- AIATSIS: A4 Kalaamaya, A1 Nyaki Nyaki

Kalaamaya, also spelled Karlamay, is a Pama–Nyungan language of Western Australia. It is poorly attested, but appears to be a close relative of Noongar.

A variety called Nyaki Nyaki (Njakinjaki) has been variously said to be a dialect of Nyungar or of Kalaamaya. Natingero has also been listed as a dialect, but it is only 40% lexically similar.

As of 2015, a single fluent speaker, Kaprun elder Brian Champion who learned the language as an adult, and several partial speakers remain.

== Phonology ==
=== Consonants ===
	Peripheral		Laminal		Apical	
	Labial	Velar	Dental	Palatal	Alveolar	Retroflex
Plosive	p	k	t̪	c	t	ʈ
Nasal	m	ŋ		ɲ	n	ɳ
Lateral				ʎ	l	ɭ
Rhotic					r	
Approximant	w			j		ɻ

- /c/ may also be heard as voiced [ɟ].

=== Vowels ===
	Front	Central	Back
High	i iː		u uː
Low		a aː	

== See also ==
- Mirning languages
