= Ngadjunmaya language =

Endangered Pama–Nyungan language of Australia

Ngadjunmaya
- Ngadjumaya
- Native to: Australia
- Region: Goldfields-Esperance; Eyre’s Sand Patch, Goddard Creek to Port Malcolm, to Fraser Range, to Naretha and Point Culver, at Mount Andres, Russell Range, Balladonia, and Norseman
- Ethnicity: Ngadjunmaia, ?Murunitja
- Native speakers: 20 (2021)
- Language family: Pama–Nyungan: Mirning; Ngadjunmaya

Language codes
- ISO 639-3: nju
- Glottolog: ngad1258
- AIATSIS: A3

Ngadjunmaya, correctly known as Ngadjumaya, is a Pama–Nyungan language of Western Australia that is located in the Goldfields-Esperance region.

Murunitja was apparently a dialect of either Ngadjumaya or of Mirning.

== Phonology ==
=== Vowels ===
Three vowels with length are present:

	Front	Back
High	i iː	u uː
Low	a aː	

- /i/ can also be heard as [e] before a velar /k/, and as [ɛ ~ æ] before palatal sounds /ʎ, j/.
- /a/ can also be heard as [ɔ] when following sounds /w, j/, and as [o] when following /k/.
- /u/ can also be heard as fronted [ʏ] when preceding /j/.

=== Consonants ===
	Peripheral		Laminal		Apical	
	Labial	Velar	Dental	Palatal	Alveolar	Retroflex
Plosive	p	k	t̪	c	t	ʈ
Nasal	m	ŋ	n̪	ɲ	n	ɳ
Lateral			l̪	ʎ	l	ɭ
Rhotic					r	ɽ
Approximant	w			j		

- /ɽ/ can be heard as either a tap [ɽ] or a glide [ɻ].
- /r/ can be heard as either a trill [r] or a tap [ɾ].
- /k/ can also have a voiced allophone of [ɣ] when in word-medial positions.
