= Yindjilandji =

Indigenous Australian people

The Yindjilandji are an Indigenous Australian people of the Northern Territory.

== Language ==
The Yindjilandji language is usually grouped as one of the Ngarna languages, and considered a southern variety, and either a dialect of Wagawa if not an independent language.

== Country ==
In Norman Tindale's guesstimate, the Yindjilandji ranged over roughly 8,200 square miles (21,000 km^{2}) of tribal land. They were a Barkly Tableland people, occupying the area about Buchanan Creek and Ranken River, with a western limits toward Dalmore and Alroy Downs. Eastwards their terrain extended over the border with Queensland close to the headwaters of the Gregory River and Lawn Hill Creek.

== Alternative names ==
- Bularnu
- Dhidhanu
- Inchalachee, Inchalanchee
- Indjilandji, Indjilindji
- Indjurandji
- Indkilindji (? typo)
- Injilinji
- Intjilatja (Alyawarre exonym)

Source: Tindale 1974, p. 226

== Sources ==
- Dixon, R. M. W. (2002). Australian Languages: Their Nature and Development. Cambridge University Press. ISBN 978-0-521-47378-1.
- Sharp, Lauriston (December 1935). "Semi-Moieties in North-Western Queensland". Oceania. 6 (2): 158–174. doi:10.1002/j.1834-4461.1935.tb00178.x. JSTOR 40327545.
- Sharp, Lauriston (March 1939a). "Tribes and Totemism in North-East Australia". Oceania. 9 (3): 254–275. doi:10.1002/j.1834-4461.1939.tb00232.x. JSTOR 40327744.
- Sharp, Lauriston (June 1939b). "Tribes and Totemism in North-East Australia (Continued)". Oceania. 9 (4): 439–461. doi:10.1002/j.1834-4461.1939.tb00248.x. JSTOR 40327762.
- Tindale, Norman Barnett (1974). "Indjilandji (NT)". Aboriginal Tribes of Australia: Their Terrain, Environmental Controls, Distribution, Limits, and Proper Names. Australian National University. ISBN 978-0-708-10741-6. Archived from the original on 17 March 2018.
- Yallop, C. L. (1969). "The Aljawara and Their Territory". Oceania. 39 (3): 187–197. doi:10.1002/j.1834-4461.1969.tb01005.x. JSTOR 40329775.
- "Yindjilandji". Ethnologue. SIL International.
