= Nyungic languages =

Family of Australian Aboriginal languages

Nyungic
- (reduced)
- Geographic distribution: South West (Western Australia)
- Linguistic classification: Pama–Nyungan: Southwest; Nyungic
- Subdivisions: Noongar; Galaagu; ?Kalaamaya

Language codes
- Glottolog: None
- Nyungic languages (green) among other Pama–Nyungan (tan). Classification of Bowern (2011). Noongar is the section in the southwest.

The Nyungic languages are the south-westernmost of the Australian Aboriginal languages:

- Nyungic
  - Noongar language
  - Galaagu language (Kalarko, Malpa)
  - Kalaamaya–Natingero

Galaagu and Kalaamaya/Natingero are poorly attested; it is not clear how close they are to each other or to Noongar, and Kalaamaya may have been a variety of Noongar proper. A variety called Njakinjaki (Nyaki Nyaki) has been variously said to be a dialect of Noongar or of Kalaamaya.

The term Nyungic has been used for the bulk of the Southwest Pama–Nyungan languages (see). However, that is a geographical group, not a demonstrable family. Bowern restricts both terms to Noongar plus Galaagu, which is poorly attested and had been misclassified as one of the Mirning languages.
