= Wirngir =

Australian Indigenous Community

The Wirngir are an Aboriginal Australian people of the Kimberley region of Western Australia.

== Country ==
Norman Tindale estimated their territorial extension to range around 800 square miles (2,100 km^{2}). They were a coastal people, whose inland borders stopped in the highlands. They were present around Cape Bernier, as far southeast lower Lyne River and Vancouver Point.

Their neighbours were the Miriwung on their east and southeastern flank, the Arnga, south and southwest, and the Yeidji directly west of their northern boundary.

== History of contact ==
The Wirngir, like other peoples in the area, were deeply affected by the Forrest River massacre, which accounted for the disarray of their social organizations, according to the anthropologist Phyllis Kaberry when she visited with the Lyne River peoples to study them in the mid-1930s.

== Alternative names ==
- Wadaja
- Walar (a putative name for their language)
- Winggir (a name for Cape Dussejour)
- Wular, Wola

Source: Tindale 1974, p. 261

== Sources ==
- "AIATSIS map of Indigenous Australia". AIATSIS. 14 May 2024.
- Elkin, A. P. (June 1933). "Totemism in North-Western Australia". Oceania. 3 (4): 435–481. doi:10.1002/j.1834-4461.1933.tb01679.x. JSTOR 40327434.
- Kaberry, Phyllis M. (June 1935). "The Forrest River and Lyne River Tribes of North-West Australia: A Report on Field Work". Oceania. 5 (4): 408–436. doi:10.1002/j.1834-4461.1935.tb00163.x. JSTOR 40327811.
- "Tindale Tribal Boundaries" (PDF). Department of Aboriginal Affairs, Western Australia. September 2016. Archived from the original (PDF) on 8 March 2016.
- Tindale, Norman Barnett (1974). "Wirngir (WA)". Aboriginal Tribes of Australia: Their Terrain, Environmental Controls, Distribution, Limits, and Proper Names. Australian National University. ISBN 978-0-708-10741-6. Archived from the original on 20 March 2020.
