= Wakaya =

Wakaya may refer to:

- Wakaya Island, a privately owned island in Lomaiviti Archipelago in Fiji
- Wakaya people, an Australian Aboriginal people of the Northern Territory
- Wakaya language, an extinct Australian Aboriginal language

== See also ==
- Waikaia, New Zealand
