= Southwest Pama–Nyungan languages =

Southwest Pama–Nyungan
- Geographic distribution: Southwestern Australia
- Linguistic classification: Pama–Nyungan: Southwest Pama–Nyungan
- Subdivisions: Kanyara; Mantharta; Nyungic

Language codes
- Glottolog: sout3134
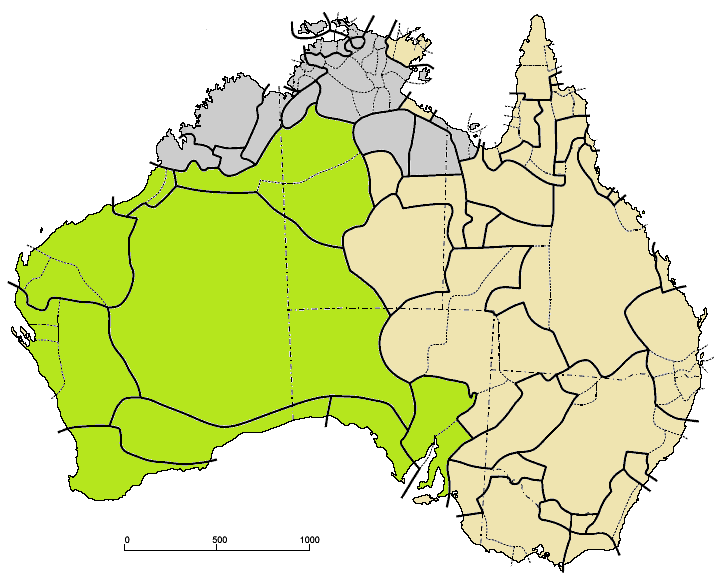

The Southwest Pama–Nyungan or Nyungic language group is the most diverse and widespread, though hypothetical, subfamily of the Pama–Nyungan language family of Australia. It contains about fifty distinct languages.

== Internal classification ==
The Kanyara and Mantharta languages appear to be the most divergent of the Southwest languages. The others are sometimes collected under the name Nyungic.

- Kanyara
- Mantharta
- Nyungic
  - Ngayarda
  - Kartu
  - Nyungar
  - Mangarla
  - Mirning (Mirniny)
  - Wati (Western Desert language)
  - Marrngu
  - Ngarrka–Ngumpin
  - Yura

== Validity ==
The proposal has been largely abandoned. Bowern (2011) restricts "Southwest Pama–Nyungan" to Nyungar plus Kalaaku (See Nyungic languages). However, the language group does correspond to a clade identified in Bouckaert et al. (2018).
