= Muruwari language =

Extinct Australian Aboriginal language

Muruwari
- Native to: Australia
- Region: Queensland and New South Wales
- Ethnicity: Muruwari
- Extinct: early 1980s
- Revival: 12 (2016)
- Language family: Pama–Nyungan: Southeastern?; Central New South Wales (geographic); Muruwari
- Dialects: Barranbinja?; Ngarntukuri; Kungkakuri; Kantakuri; Purukuri; Thinuntu

Language codes
- ISO 639-3: zmu
- Glottolog: muru1266
- AIATSIS: D32
- ELP: Muruwari
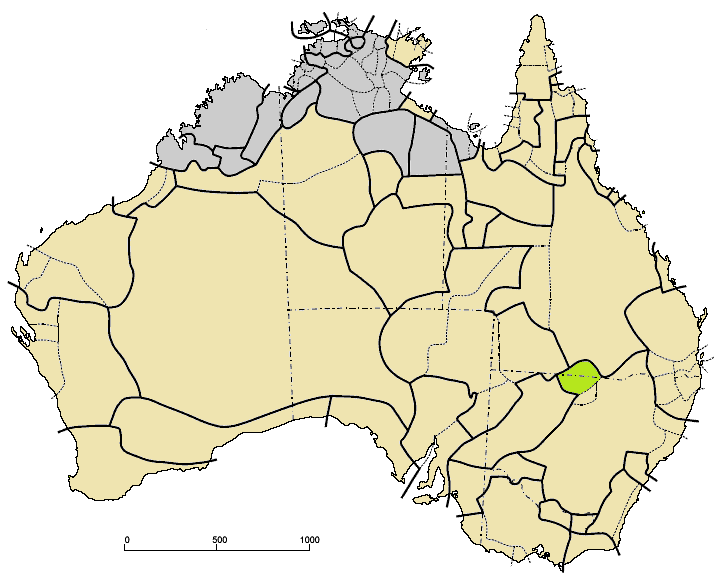
- Muruwari (green) among other Pama–Nyungan languages (tan)

Muruwari (also Muruwarri, Murawari, Murawarri) is an extinct Australian Aboriginal language of the Muruwari people, an isolate within the Pama–Nyungan family. Poorly attested Barranbinja may have been a dialect. Muruwari means 'to fall (warri) with a fighting club (murru) in one's hand'. The Muruwari language region includes the areas around the Paroo Shire in Queensland and Brewarrina Shire in New South Wales.

The Muruwari language was collated from many tapes of language material recorded by Jimmie Barker of Brewarrina, Emily Horneville (Mrs Ornable) and Shillin Jackson of Goodooga, and Robin Campbell of Weilmoringle. The Murawari language was first published by R. H. Mathews in the early 1900s and again by Ian Sims, Judy Trefry, Janet Mathews, and Lynette F. Oates (1988). Oates' grammar is based on the recordings made by Jimmie Barker and Janet Mathews from 1968 to 1972, and Bill Campbell and Judy Trefry in 1967, and supplemented by her own field work in Goodooga with the last remaining full speakers, Mrs Emily Horneville and Mr Robin Campbell, among others.

== Classification ==
Lynette Oates' work on Muruwari and Barranbinya corroborates the view that both languages are most likely in a dialect relation, giving a cognate count of 44% between the two varieties. R.H. Mathews (1903), who recorded both Muruwari and Barranbinya, also commented that besides vocabulary differences, the grammar of both Muruwari and Barranbinya were essentially the same.

Together, Muruwari and Barranbinya form an isolate group within the Pama–Nyungan language family, being very different in many respects from its geographic neighbours (which belong to many different Pama–Nyungan subgroups). To the east, both are bordered by the Wiradhuric languages, Yuwaaliyaay and Yuwaalaraay speakers; to the south by Ngiyambaa speakers (also Wiradhuric); and to the north by speakers of Maric languages, including Guwamu and Badjiri. To the west, they neighboured Kurnu speakers (part of the Paakantyi dialect continuum). The Muruwari language was influenced through contact with many of these neighbouring languages, and influences can even be traced to the Karnic languages and the languages of the Western Desert.

More recently, Claire Bowern and Quentin Atkinson's lexicostatistical work placed Muruwari together with the Wiradhuric languages, forming a "Central NSW group", to which other Southeastern Pama-Nyungan languages are related.

== Phonology ==
=== Phonemic inventory ===
The phonemic inventory is very similar to Barranbinya. Letters used by Oates are in angle brackets.

Consonant phonemes
		Peripheral		Central			
		Labial	Velar	Laminal		Apical	
		Labial	Velar	Dental	Palatal	Alveolar	Retroflex
Stops		⟨p⟩ /p/	⟨k⟩ /k/	⟨th⟩ /t̪/	⟨tj⟩ /c/	⟨t⟩ /t/	⟨rt⟩* /ʈ/
Nasals		⟨m⟩ /m/	⟨ng⟩ /ŋ/	⟨nh⟩ /n̪/	⟨nj⟩ /ɲ/	⟨n⟩ /n/	⟨rn⟩* /ɳ/
Laterals						⟨l⟩* /l/	⟨rl⟩* /ɭ/
Rhotics	Trill					⟨rr⟩* /r/	
Rhotics	Flap					⟨R⟩* /ɾ/	
Rhotics	Retroflex						⟨r⟩* /ɻ/
Semivowels		⟨w⟩ /w/			⟨y⟩ /j/		

All phonemes except those with a star (*) may be word-initial.

Vowel phonemes
	Front	Central	Back
High	⟨i⟩ /i/, ⟨ii⟩ /iː/		⟨u⟩ /u/, ⟨uu⟩ /uː/
Low		⟨a⟩ /a/, ⟨aa⟩ /aː/	

== Morphosyntax ==
According to Oates, Muruwari is an affix-transferring language (borrowing a term from Arthur Capell): many suffixes (particularly tense, aspect and person suffixes, but also stem-forming suffixes) can be 'transferred' from the verb to other words in the clause. Nouns, adjectives, demonstratives, verb modifiers (such as pinja 'only' and warri 'not sure'), adverbs (such as ngarlu 'again'), interrogatives and pronouns can receive verbal suffixes. The exact function of this is unclear.

== Vocabulary ==
Example sentence:

- "Pitara yaan Muruwariki" meaning: "Muruwari is good, sweet talk”

Some words from the Muruwari language, as spelt and written by Muruwari authors include:

- Kula: kangaroo
- Kuya: fish
- Mara: hand
- Marrinj thalu: good day
- Ngapa: water (fresh)
- Ngurra: camp
- Pipi: baby
- Thurri: sun
- Witji-witji: bird(s)

== See also ==
- Murrawarri Republic
