= Acacia haematites =

Coates cushion wattle

Conservation status
- Priority One — Poorly Known Taxa (DEC)

Scientific classification
- Kingdom: Plantae
- Clade: Tracheophytes
- Clade: Angiosperms
- Clade: Eudicots
- Clade: Rosids
- Order: Fabales
- Family: Fabaceae
- Subfamily: Caesalpinioideae
- Clade: Mimosoid clade
- Genus: Acacia
- Species: A. haematites

Binomial name
- Acacia haematites Maslin

Species of legume

Acacia haematites, also known as Koolyanobbing ironstone wattle, is a species of flowering plant in the family Fabaceae and is only known from a single range in inland Western Australia. It is a diffuse shrub with narrowly oblong to narrowly lance-shaped phyllodes, spherical heads of golden yellow flowers and linear, strongly curved to coiled or twisted pods.

== Description ==
Acacia haematites is a diffuse shrub that typically grows to a height of up to about 1 m (3 ft 3 in), with its upper branched divided into many short, straight, rigid, glabrous branchlets. Its phyllodes are narrowly oblong to narrowly lance-shaped, narrowed towards the outer end, 6–12 mm (0.24–0.47 in) long, 1–2 mm (0.039–0.079 in) wide with a tapered, sharply pointed, dark brown cusp 1.0–1.5 mm (0.039–0.059 in) long, similar to those on the upper branchlets. There is a gland 2–5 mm (0.079–0.197 in) above the base of the phyllodes and stipules 1–2 mm (0.039–0.079 in) long at the base, but that fall off early. The flowers are borne in a sessile spherical head in axils, each head with five to nine golden yellow flowers with a spatula-shaped, sessile brown bracteole. Flowering occurs in August and September, and the pods are more or less linear, sometimes appearing like a string of beads, strongly curved to openly coiled or twisted, up to 35 mm (1.4 in) long, 2.5–3.0 mm (0.098–0.118 in) wide and prominently rounded over the seeds. The seeds have a club-shaped aril about half as long as the seeds.

== Taxonomy ==
Acacia haematites was first formally described in 2014 by Bruce Maslin in the journal Nuytsia from specimens collected in the Koolyanobbing Range in 2009. The specific epithet (haematites) means 'blood stone, a kind of red iron ore, hematite', referring to the ironstone habitat of this species.

== Distribution and habitat ==
Koolyanobbing ironstone wattle is only known from a single range near Koolyanobbing where it grows below massive outcrops of banded iron formation in open shrubland in the Coolgardie bioregion of inland Western Australia.

== Conservation status ==
Acacia haematites is listed as "Priority One" by the Government of Western Australia Department of Biodiversity, Conservation and Attractions, meaning that it is known from only one or a few locations where it is potentially at risk.

== See also ==
- List of Acacia species
