= Natingero language =

Extinct Australian Aboriginal language

Natingero
- Native to: Australia
- Region: Western Australia
- Ethnicity: Natingero
- Era: attested 1886
- Language family: Pama–Nyungan: Nyungic; Kalamaya–Natingero; Natingero

Language codes
- ISO 639-3: None (mis)
- Glottolog: None
- AIATSIS: A95

Natingero is an Aboriginal Australian language of Western Australia. It has been listed as a dialect of Kalaamaya, but is only around 40% lexically similar.

== Classification ==
Natingero has been described by Norman Tindale and Geoffrey O'Grady, Charles F. Voegelin, and Florence M. Voegelin as an alternative name for Kalaamaya. Thomas Adam collected a vocabulary of Natingero, which was later published in 1886 by Edward Curr in his book The Australian Race. Curr found that Natingero, along with other languages spoken by the "Minung" tribes, had "a good many words" in common with languages spoken on the coast.
