= Wagaya language =

Extinct Australian Aboriginal language

Wagaya
- Ngarru
- Region: Northern Territory
- Ethnicity: Wagaya, Yindjilandji
- Extinct: (date missing)
- Language family: Pama–Nyungan: Ngarna; South; Wagaya
- Dialects: Wagaya; Yindjilandji; Bularnu (Dhidhanu, Baringkirri)

Language codes
- ISO 639-3: Either: wga – Wagaya yil – Yindjilandji
- Glottolog: ngar1291 Ngarru / Wagaya-Yindjilandji bula1255 Bularnu
- AIATSIS: C16 Wakaya, G12.1 Bularnu, G14 Indjilandji
- ELP: Wakaya
- Yindjilandji

Wagaya (Wakaya) is an extinct Australian Aboriginal language of Queensland. Yindjilandji (Indjilandji) may have been a separate language. The linguist Gavan Breen recorded two dialects of the language, an Eastern and a Western variety, incorporating their description in his 1974 grammar.

== Classification ==
Wagaya belongs to the Warluwarric (Ngarna) subgroup of the Pama–Nyungan family of Australian languages. It is most related to Yindjilandji, Bularnu, and Warluwarra. Gavan Breen groups Wagaya together with Yindjilandji into the "Ngarru" group, while Bularnu and Warluwarra form the "Thawa" group (each respectively after the common word for 'man, Aboriginal person'). These two groups together form the southern branch of Ngarna/Warluwarric, to which the discontinuous Yanyuwa is related at the uppermost level of the whole subgroup.

Work on proto-Warluwarric has been done by Catherine Koch (1989), Daniel Brammall (1991), Margaret Carew (1993), and Gavan Breen (2004).

== Sounds ==
Wakaya consonants
	Labial	Velar	Dental	Lamino- alveolar	Alveolar	Retroflex
Stop	b	ɡ	d̪	d̠ʲ	d	ɖ
Nasal	m	ŋ	n̪	n̠ʲ	n	ɳ
Lateral			l̪	l̠ʲ	l	ɭ
Flap					ɾ	
Glide	w			j		ɻ

Stops may also be pronounced as voiceless [p, k, t̪, t̠ʲ, t, ʈ].

Wakaya vowels
	Front	Central	Back
High	ɪ, iː		ʊ, uː
Mid		ə	
Low		a	

Bularnu consonants
	Labial	Velar	Dental	Lamino- alveolar	Apico- alveolar	Retroflex
Voiceless stop	p	k	t̪	t̠ʲ	t	ʈ
Voiced stop	b	ɡ	d̪	d̠ʲ	d	ɖ
Nasal	m	ŋ	n̪	n̠ʲ	n	ɳ
Lateral			l̪	l̠ʲ	l	ɭ
Tap/Trill					ɾ~r	
Glide	w			j		ɻ

Bularnu vowels
	Front	Central	Back
High	i, iː		u, uː
Low		a, aː	

== History ==
There are reports of around 10 Native speakers worldwide as of 1983, but the language is currently extinct.

== Geographic distribution ==
While endangeredlanguages.com reports 10 speakers of this language as of 1983, ethnologue.com explicitly states that the language is extinct.

Broadly speaking, the traditional language of Wakaya country is to the north east and east of Tennant Creek, Alyawarre is to the east and south east, Kaytetye is to the South, and Warlpiri to the west.

Coordinates

Latitude: -20.33 Longitude: 137.62

== Grammar ==
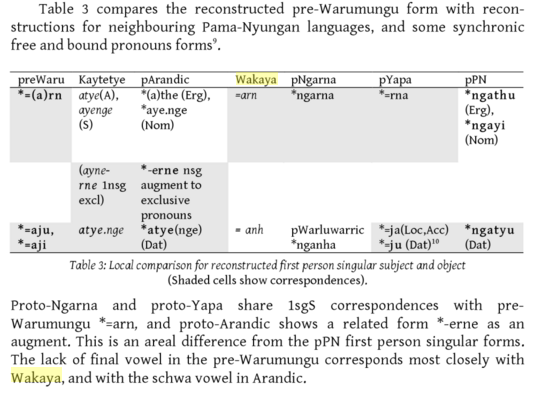

On the right is an example of the many comparisons of Wakaya grammar to other Australian languages within the same family.

The Wambaya language is a neighbor of the Wakaya group and thus there are many similarities in the grammar and word structures between the two languages. A Grammar of Wambaya was written by Dr. Rachel Nordlinger in hope of helping younger Wambaya speakers learn something of their language or at least have access to their language when it is no longer being spoken around them since there were only 8 to 10 fluent speakers of the language left around the late 1990s.

There are many references to Wakaya's linguistic characteristics such as its vocabulary and grammar structure and how they compare to other Australian languages within the same family group in Australian Languages: Classification and the comparative method.

“The Ngumpin-YAPA Subgroup” is an article by the Australian Institute of Aboriginal and Torres Strait Islander Studies and The University of Queensland which provides shared innovations within the Ngumpin-Yapa languages such as phonological, morphological, and lexical changes. There are several common elements between the NGY and Warluwarric groups (which Wakaya is a sub-group of) and so this article presents some linguistic characteristics such as vocabulary and spelling comparisons of the Wakaya language.
