= Barranbinja language =

Extinct Australian Aboriginal language

Barranbinja
- Barranbinya
- Native to: Australia
- Region: New South Wales
- Ethnicity: Barranbinya
- Extinct: 1979, with the death of Emily Margaret Horneville
- Language family: Pama–Nyungan: Southeastern?; Central New South Wales?; Muruwaric; Barranbinja

Language codes
- ISO 639-3: (covered by zmu Muruwari)
- Glottolog: barr1252
- AIATSIS: D26
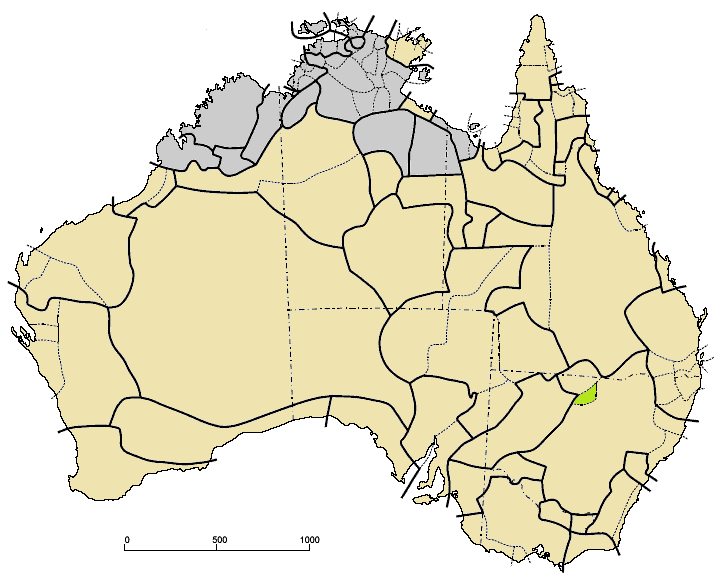
- Barranbinja (green) among other Pama–Nyungan languages (tan)

Barranbinja or Barrabinya is an extinct Australian Aboriginal language of New South Wales. The last speaker was probably Emily Margaret Horneville (d. 1979), who was recorded by Lynette Oates who then published a short description of it. It had also been recorded by R.H. Mathews along with Muruwari, though not all items in his wordlist were recognised by Horneville. Both Mathews and Oates conclude that Barranbinya and Muruwari were in a dialect relation.

== Classification ==
Lynette Oates' work on Muruwari and Barranbinya gives a cognate count of 44% between the two varieties, concluding that both were likely in a dialect relation. R.H. Mathews (1903), who recorded both Muruwari and Barranbinya, also commented that besides vocabulary differences, the grammar of both Muruwari and Barranbinya were essentially the same.

Together, Muruwari and Barranbinya form an isolate group within the Pama-Nyungan language family, and were very different in many respects from their geographic neighbours (which belong to many different Pama-Nyungan subgroups). For more information, see the description for Muruwari.

== Phonology ==
=== Phonemic inventory ===
The phonemic inventory is very similar to Muruwari, although the relative paucity of data means that the status of many phonemes is not clear (in round brackets).

Consonant phonemes
	Peripheral		Apical		Laminal	
	Velar	Labial	Retroflex	Alveolar	Palatal	Dental
Stops	⟨g⟩ /k/	⟨b⟩ /p/	⟨rd⟩* /ʈ/	⟨d⟩ /t/	⟨dy⟩* /c/	⟨dh⟩ /t̪/
Nasals	⟨ng⟩ /ŋ/	⟨m⟩ /m/	⟨rn⟩* /ɳ/	⟨n⟩ /n/	⟨ny⟩* /ɲ/	⟨nh⟩ /n̪/
Laterals			(⟨rl⟩* /ɭ/)	⟨l⟩* /l/	(⟨ly⟩* /ʎ/)	(⟨lh⟩* /l̪/)
Rhotics			⟨r⟩* /ɻ/	(⟨R⟩* /ɾ/)		
Rhotics			⟨r⟩* /ɻ/	⟨rr⟩* /r/		
Semivowels		⟨w⟩ /w/			⟨y⟩ /j/	

All phonemes except those with a star (*) may be word-initial.

Vowel phonemes
	Front	Central	Back
High	⟨i⟩ /i/, ⟨ii⟩ /iː/		⟨u⟩ /u/, ⟨uu⟩ /uː/
Low		⟨a⟩ /a/, ⟨aa⟩ /aː/	

=== Phonotactics ===
Nearly all words end in a vowel, though there are some rare occurrences of word-final -ny and -n, which is in stark contrast with neighbouring Muruwari and Ngiyambaa, where word-final nasals and approximants are very common. Oates speculates that this may be the result of influence from Paakantyi and other western languages, which also display a preference for word-final vowels.
