= Yanyuwa language =

Pama–Nyungan language of northern Australia

Yanyuwa
- Yanyuwa
- Pronunciation: [jaṉuwa]
- Native to: Australia
- Region: Northern Territory
- Ethnicity: Yanyuwa, Wadiri
- Native speakers: 47 (2021 census)
- Language family: Pama–Nyungan: Ngarna; Yanyuwa

Language codes
- ISO 639-3: jao
- Glottolog: yany1243
- AIATSIS: N153
- ELP: Yanyuwa
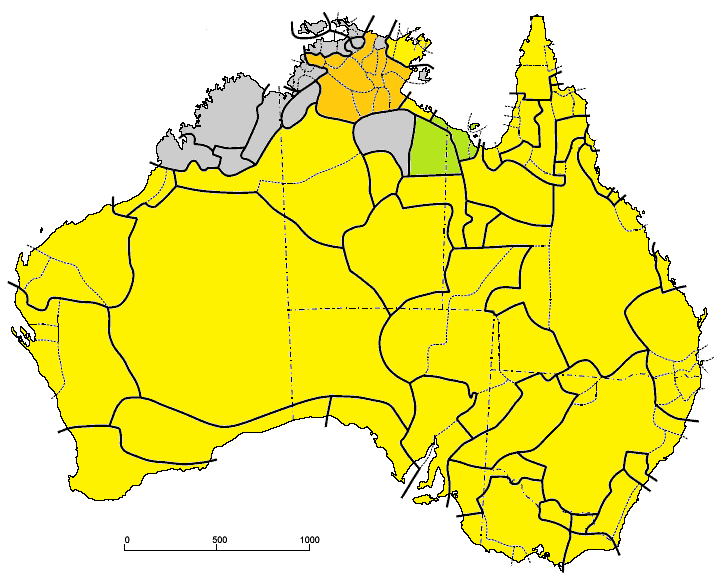
- Yanyuwa is the patch of yellow on the northern coast, between the orange and the green.

Yanyuwa (Yanyuwa pronunciation: [jaṉuwa]) is the language of the Yanyuwa people of the Sir Edward Pellew Group of Islands in the Gulf of Carpentaria outside Borroloola (Yanyuwa: Burrulula) in the Northern Territory, Australia.

Yanyuwa, like many other Australian Aboriginal languages, is a highly agglutinative language with ergative-absolutive alignment, whose grammar is pervaded by a set of 16 noun classes whose agreements are complicated and numerous.

Yanyuwa is a critically endangered language. The anthropologist John Bradley has worked with the Yanyuwa people for three decades and is also a speaker of Yanyuwa. He has produced a large dictionary and grammar of the language, along with a cultural atlas in collaboration with a core group of senior men and women.

== Classification ==
Dixon (2002), who rejects the validity of Pama–Nyungan, accepts that Yanyuwa is demonstrably related to Warluwara and languages closely related to it.

== Speech styles ==
In Yanyuwa, certain words have synonyms used to replace the everyday term in certain cultural situations.

=== Avoidance speech ===
Avoidance speech is speech style used when talking to or near certain relatives: one's siblings and cousins of the opposite sex, one's brother-in-law, sister-in-law, father-in-law and mother-in-law, and one's nieces and nephews if their father (for male speakers) or their mother (for female speakers) has died. Occasionally, avoidance speech takes the form of different affixes to usual speech, but generally, it is simply a change in vocabulary.

For example, a digging stick is usually referred to as na-wabija, but when talking to one of the above relatives, the word used is na-wulungkayangu.

An example of avoidance speech is given below:

Ja-wingkayi ki-buyukalu wubanthawu ma-ngarra.
Ja-wuynykurninji ki-bujibujilu runungkawu ma-wulyarri.
He is going to the fire to cook food.

=== Ritual speech ===
Another set of vocabulary is used during ceremonies and other ritual occasions. Many of the words used in ritual speech are sacred and kept secret.

For example, a dingo is usually referred to as wardali, but during ritual occasions, the word used is yarrarriwira. That is one ritual term which is known to the general public, as are some other terms for flora and fauna.

=== Island speech ===
When on the Sir Edward Pellew Group of Islands, which is part of Yanyuwa territory, another set of vocabulary may be used to replace the terms used when on the mainland. There is more variance about the usage of island speech than the other speech styles.

For example, on the mainland, fishing is referred to as wardjangkayarra, but on the islands, the word used is akarimantharra.

== Phonology ==
Yanyuwa is extremely unusual in having 7 places of articulation for stops, compared to 3 for English and 4–6 for most other Australian languages. As with many other Australian languages, it lacks a voicing contrast.

=== Consonants ===
The table below illustrates Yanyuwa's consonant phonemes:

		Peripheral			Laminal		Apical	
		Bilabial	Pre- velar	Post- velar	Post- alveolar	Dental	Alveolar	Retroflex
Occlusive	nasal	m ⟨m⟩	ŋ̟ ⟨nyng⟩	ŋ̠ ⟨ng⟩	n̠ ⟨ny⟩	n̪ ⟨nh⟩	n ⟨n⟩	ɳ ⟨rn⟩
Occlusive	prenasal	ᵐb ⟨mb⟩	ᵑɡ̟ ⟨nyk⟩	ᵑɡ̠ ⟨ngk⟩	ⁿd̠ ⟨nj⟩	ⁿd̪ ⟨nth⟩	ⁿd ⟨nd⟩	ᶯɖ ⟨rnd⟩
Occlusive	plosive	b ⟨b⟩	ɡ̟ ⟨yk⟩	ɡ̠ ⟨k⟩	d̠ ⟨j⟩	d̪ ⟨th⟩	d ⟨d⟩	ɖ ⟨rd⟩
Continuant	lateral				l̠ ⟨ly⟩	l̪ ⟨lh⟩	l ⟨l⟩	ɭ ⟨rl⟩
Continuant	median	w ⟨w⟩	j ⟨y⟩				r ⟨rr⟩	ɻ ⟨r⟩

- The post-velars are further back than the cross-linguistic average, but they are not uvular.

=== Vowels ===
The table below illustrates Yanyuwa's vowel phonemes:

	Front	Back
Close	i	u
Open	a	

Their phonetic realizations vary significantly depending on adjacent consonants, especially before laminal palatals.

== Morphology ==
=== Noun classes ===
Yanyuwa has 16 noun classes, distinguished by prefixes. In some cases, different prefixes are used, depending on whether the speaker is a male or a female.

Yanyuwa Noun Classes
Prefix^{2}	Class	Example(s)	Gloss
rra-/a-^{1}	female (human centred)	rra-bardibardi	"old lady"
nya-^{w} ∅-^{m}	male (human centred)	nya-malbu^{w} malbu^{m}	"old man"
rra-/a-^{1}	feminine	a-karnkarnka	"white bellied sea eagle"
∅-	masculine	nangurrbuwala	"hill kangaroo"
ma-	food (non-meat)	ma-ngakuya	"cycad fruit"
na-	arboreal	na-wabija	"digging stick"
narnu-	abstract	narnu-wardi	"badness"
possessive pronominal prefixes	body parts	nanda-wulaya	"her head"
possessive pronominal prefixes	body parts	niwa-wulaya^{w} na-wulaya^{m}	"his head"
∅-	familiar kinship	kajaja	"father, dad"
various pronominal prefixes	formal kinship for close kin	angatharra-wangu	"my wife"
various pronominal prefixes	formal kinship-grandparent level	karna-marrini	"my daughter's child"
various pronominal prefixes/suffixes	formal kinship-avoidance	rra-kayibanthayindalu	"your daughter in law"
rri- (dual) and li- (plural)	human group	li-maramaranja	"dugong hunters of excellence"
rra-/a-^{1}, nya-^{w} ∅-^{m}	personal names	rra-Marrngawi, nya-Lajumba^{w} Lajumba^{m}	
rra-/a-^{1} / ∅-	ceremony names	rra-Kunabibi, Yilayi, rra-Milkathatha	
∅-	place names	Kandanbarrawujbi, Burrulula, Wathangka	

==== Notes ====
^w Women's speech.
^m Men's speech.
^1 rra- is a more formal female/feminine prefix often used in elicitations, and a- is the informal everyday form. There is only one word in Yanyuwa, rra-ardu "girl", in which the rra- prefix is always used. That distinguishes it from the men's speech form ardu "boy" for which women say nya-ardu.
^2 ∅- is used to indicate no prefix.

=== Male and female dialects ===
Yanyuwa is unusual among languages of the world in that it has separate dialects for men and for women at the morphological level. The only time that men use the women's dialect is if they are quoting someone of the opposite sex and vice versa. An example of this speech is provided below:

nya-buyi nya-ardu kiwa-wingka waykaliya wulangindu kanyilu-kala nyikunya-baba.
buyi ardu ka-wingka waykaliya wulangindu kila-kala nyiku-baba.
The little boy went down to the river and saw his brother.

The BBC reported in 2018 that there were 3 fluent female speakers worldwide.

== Media ==
=== Films ===
Yanyuwa-speakers have actively engaged in making a number of films, and more recently have begun a project to animate important stories and songlines. These include three important films, all of which have extensive narratives in Yanyuwa, with subtitles:

- Kanymarda Yuwa – Two Laws,
- Buwarrala Akarriya – Journey East,
- Ka-wayawayama – Aeroplane Dance.

=== Music ===
Singer Shellie Morris released in May 2013 a song album Ngambala Wiji Li-Wunungu – Together We are Strong, with songs in Yanyuwa.

== Bibliography ==
- Bradley, John; Kirton, Jean; Yanyuwa Community (1992). Yanyuwa Wuka: Language from Yanyuwa country, a Yanyuwa dictionary and cultural resource (Unpublished manuscript).
