= Muruwari =

Aboriginal Australian people

The Muruwari, also spelt Murawari, Murawarri, Murrawarri and other variants, are an Aboriginal Australian people of the state of New South Wales and the southwestern area of Queensland.

== Language ==
A monograph on and a dictionary of Muruwari have been published by Lynette Oates.

== Country ==
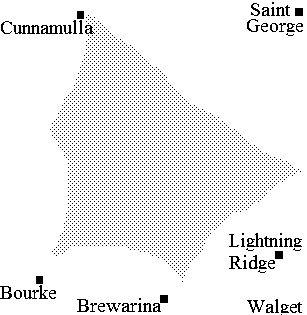
The Muruwari traditional lands

The Muruwari lands stretch over some 6,300 square miles (16,000 km^{2}) around Barringun, on the Queensland - New South Wales border, extending north as far as Mulga Downs and Weela in the former state. It includes Enngonia on the Warrego River; Brenda, and Weilmoringle on the Culgoa River, as well as Milroy, and south as far as the vicinity of Collerina.

== History of contact ==
The explorer Thomas Mitchell, during his expedition to find a route to the Gulf of Carpentaria, surveyed the area of the Culgoa and Balonne Rivers in 1846, relying on a Wiradjuri guide and interpreter Yuranigh. At the same time, In 1845 his son Roderick Mitchell, who was Commissioner of Crown Lands, on hearing stockmen's reports of rich pasturage in the area, began mapping it. By 1850 regulations allowed settlers to take up 50 square miles (130 km^{2}) of land on 14 year leases. Conflicts arose over land use, and several massacres and killings took place in the following years.

Many Muruwari attached themselves to established stations, working there except for specific periods when ritual duties or "going bush" led them to take leave: newspaper reports at the time single out Thomas Caddell's Tatala run, managed by Frederick Wherritt, as a station where relations were conducted "with tact and humanity". Wherritt's approach paid off: several hundred sheep were saved in the 1861 flood when the local blacks rescued them by herding them up to the one piece of high dry ground in the area.

== Alternative names ==
- Murawari, Murawarri, Murrawarri, Muruworri, Muruwurri
- Murueri
- Moorawarree, Moorawarrie
- Marawari

== See also ==
- Murrawarri Republic

== Sources ==
- Harrison, Rodney (2004). Shared Landscapes: Archaeologies of Attachment and the Pastoral Industry in New South Wales. University of New South Wales Press. ISBN 978-0-868-40559-9.
- Horton, David, ed. (1994). "AIATSIS map of Indigenous Australia". AIATSIS.
- Mathews, R. H. (September 1897). "Message-Sticks Used by the Aborigines of Australia". American Anthropologist. 10 (9): 288–298. JSTOR 658501.
- Oates, Lynette Francis (1985). "Emily Margaret Horneville of the Muruwari". In White, Isobel; Barwick, Diane; Meehan, Betty (eds.). In Fighters and Singers: The Lives of Some Australian Aboriginal Women. A&U Academic. pp. 106–122. ISBN 978-0-868-61620-9.
- Oates, Lynette Francis (1988). The Muruwari Language (PDF). Pacific Linguistics. ISBN 978-0-858-83384-5.
- Oates, Lynette Francis (1992). Muruwari (Moo-roo-warri) dictionary: words of an Aboriginal language of north-western New South Wales (Brewarrina-Goodooga-Bourke area) written for schools [Muruwari/English]. Albury, New South Wales: Graeme van Brummelen.
- Tindale, Norman Barnett (1974). "Morowari (NSW)". Aboriginal Tribes of Australia: Their Terrain, Environmental Controls, Distribution, Limits, and Proper Names. Australian National University.
