= Forrest River =

River in Western Australia

Coordinates: 15°18′27″S 128°3′55″E

Location
- Country: Australia

Physical characteristics
- Source
  - location: near Pseudomys Hill
  - elevation: 319 metres (1,047 ft)
- Mouth
  - location: Cambridge Gulf
  - elevation: sea level
- Length: 141 km (88 mi)

The Forrest River is a river in the Kimberley region of Western Australia.

The river rises just east of Pseudomys Hill in the Drysdale River National Park and flows in an easterly direction until discharging into the western arm of the Cambridge Gulf.

The river was named in 1884 by Staff Commander J.E. Coghlan while conducting hydrographic surveys in the area. The river is named after John Forrest, who was Surveyor General at the time.

The traditional owners of the area that the river flows through are the Ngarinjin and the Yeidji peoples.
