= Ngarna languages =

Branch of the Pama–Nyungan language family of Australia

Ngarna
- Warluwaric, Warluwarric
- Geographic distribution: Northern Territory, Queensland
- Linguistic classification: Pama–Nyungan: Ngarna
- Subdivisions: Yanyuwa; South Ngarna

Language codes
- Glottolog: ngar1290
- Ngarna languages (green) among other Pama–Nyungan (tan). The two Ngarna areas are separated by the Garrwan and Mirndi languages (grey).

The Ngarna or Warluwar(r)ic languages are a discontinuous primary branch of the Pama–Nyungan language family of Australia. The moribund Yanyuwa language is the only survivor of this group.

The two geographic and also cladistic groups are:

- Ngarna
  - Yanyuwa
  - Southern Ngarna/Warluwar(r)ic
    - Ngarru
      - Wagaya †
      - Yindjilandji †
    - Thawa
      - Bularnu †
      - Warluwara †

== History and status ==
"Warluwar(r)ic" was first proposed by O'Grady, Voegelin and Voegelin (1966), consisting of Warluwarra only, to which the "Wakayic" (consisting of Wakaya) and "Yanyulan" groups (consisting of Yanyuwa) were later proved to be related. Bularnu and Yindjilandji were later recorded and also added to the classification. On the basis of shared pronoun systems and nominal case-marking, Barry Blake (1988) later grouped Yanyuwa, Wakaya (and by extension Yindjilandji), Bularnu and Warluwarra into the "Warluwaric" subgroup of Pama-Nyungan. Breen (2004) proposed the name "Ngarna" over "Warluwar(r)ic" (in reference to the first-person singular nominative pronoun common to all members of the subgroup), although "Warluwar(r)ic" is still commonly used. For one, Mary Laughren retains the label "Warluwarric" on the basis that (nga)rna is a common retention among many other Western Pama-Nyungan languages and not exactly unique to this subgroup.

Within the subgroup, Breen uses lexicostatical evidence, and also evidence from nominal and verbal morphology, to distinguish between the "Ngarru" group (containing Wagaya and Yindjilandji) and the "Thawa" group (containing Bularnu and Warluwara), each respectively after the common word for 'man, Aboriginal person'. These two groups together form the southern branch of Ngarna/Warluwar(r)ic, to which the discontinuous Yanyuwa is related at the uppermost level of the subgroup. Work on proto-Ngarna/Warluwar(r)ic has been done by Catherine Koch (1989), Daniel Brammall (1991), Margaret Carew (1993), and Gavan Breen (2004).

Beyond the subgroup, relations with other branches of Pama-Nyungan are more speculative. McConvell and Laughren (2004) entertain the possibility that the Ngumpin-Yapa languages and the Ngarna/Warluwar(r)ic languages share a common ancestor, although other evidence also suggests a closer genetic relation between Ngumpin-Yapa and the more southerly branches. In any case, early and sustained contact between speakers of Ngumpin-Yapa and Ngarna/Warluwar(r)ic languages is evinced by shared phonological changes and certain lexical similarities. Using computational phylogenetic methods, Bowern and Atkinson (2012) grouped the Ngarna/Warluwar(r)ic languages into the "Western Pama-Nyungan" group. Their work suggests a tentative link between Ngarna/Warluwar(r)ic and the Yolngu languages, forming a higher subgroup to which the other Western Pama-Nyungan branches (i.e. Southwest Nyungic and Desert Nyungic) are more distantly related.
