= Murunitja =

Indigenous Western Australian people

The Murunitja are an indigenous Australian people of Western Australia located within the Goldfields-Esperance region.

== Name ==
The ethnonym Murunitja appears to derive for a word murun, meaning a "stout person", referring to the characteristic build of the tribe.

== Language ==
The Murunitja language is closely related to Mirnung and Ngadjunmaya.

== Country ==
Murunitja country covered about 11,000 square miles (28,000 km^{2}) from the northern edge of the Nullarbor Plain at Naretha to Loongana. They also ranged as far as Rawlinna and the Walawuluna Rockhole.

== Alternative names ==
- Mooroon
- Murnidja
- Mara (?)
- Kogara ('east')

== Sources ==
- "AIATSIS map of Indigenous Australia". AIATSIS. 14 May 2024.
- "Tindale Tribal Boundaries" (PDF). Department of Aboriginal Affairs, Western Australia. September 2016.
- Berndt, R. M. (September 1941). "Tribal Migrations and Myths Centring on Ooldea, South Australia". Oceania. 12 (1): 1–20. doi:10.1002/j.1834-4461.1941.tb00343.x. JSTOR 40327930.
- Berndt, R. M.; Johnston, T. Harvey (March 1942). "Death, Burial, and Associated Ritual at Ooldea, South Australia". Oceania. 12 (3): 189–208. doi:10.1002/j.1834-4461.1942.tb00357.x. JSTOR 40327948.
- Tindale, Norman Barnett (1974). "Murunitja (WA)". Aboriginal Tribes of Australia: Their Terrain, Environmental Controls, Distribution, Limits, and Proper Names. Australian National University. ISBN 978-0-708-10741-6. Archived from the original on 20 March 2020.
