= Mirning languages =

Pama–Nyungan language family of the Nullarbor Coast

Mirniny
- Mirning
- Geographic distribution: Nullarbor, Australia
- Linguistic classification: Pama–Nyungan: Southwest; Mirniny
- Subdivisions: Mirniny; Ngatjumaya

Language codes
- Glottolog: None
- Mirniny languages (green) among other Pama–Nyungan (tan).

The Mirning or Mirniny languages are a pair of Pama–Nyungan languages of the Nullarbor Coast of Australia.

- Mirning (Mirniny)
- Ngadjumaya (Ngatjumaya)

Galaagu (Kalarko) and Kalaamaya, once classified with Mirning as part of a Kalarko-Mirniny family, are now considered closer to Nyungar.
