= Kalarko–Mirniny language =

Kalarko–Mirniny is a Glottolog classification that includes:

- Kalarko language
- Mirniny language
