= Wiradhuric languages =

Pama–Nyungan language family of Australia

Wiradhuric
- Central New South Wales
- Geographic distribution: New South Wales
- Linguistic classification: Pama–Nyungan: Southeastern; Wiradhuric
- Subdivisions: Gamilaraay; Wiradjuri; Ngiyambaa

Language codes
- Glottolog: wira1261
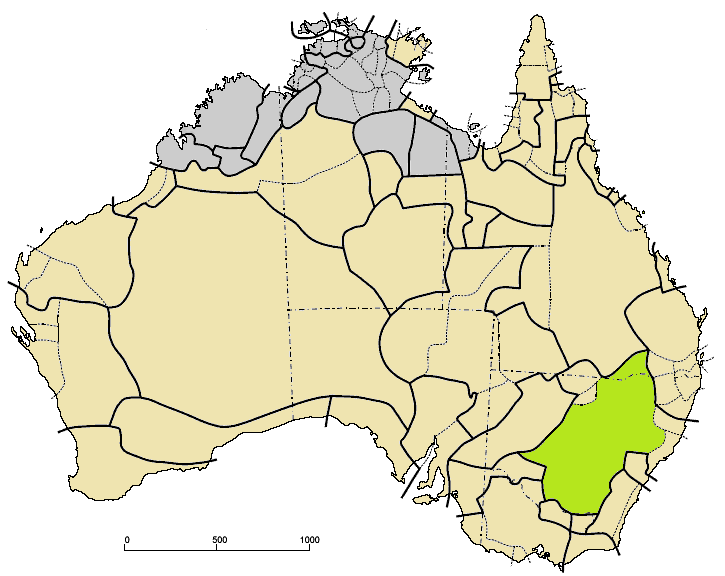
- Wiradhuric languages (green) among other Pama–Nyungan (tan)

The Wiradhuric languages or Central (Inland) New South Wales, are a family of Pama–Nyungan languages of Australia. There are three languages:

- Wiradhuric
  - Gamilaraay (northeast)
    - Wiradjuri (south)
    - Ngiyambaa (west)

All are now moribund.

Wiradjuri and Ngiyambaa appear to be more closely related to each other than to Gamilaraay, as they show some common features that Gamilaraay lacks. The languages are close enough to be accepted as related in the conservative classification of Dixon (2002). Bowern (2011) lists the Yuwaaliyaay and Yuwaalaraay varieties of Gamilaraay as separate languages. Bigambal may have been another, if it was not one of the Banjalung languages. The Gujambal language has been listed as Wiradhuric, but is practically undocumented.

== Comparison ==
Wiradhuric			Non-Wiradhuric	Gloss
Wiradjuri	Ngiyambaa	Gamilaraay	Baagandji	Gloss
ngandhi	ngandi-	ngaana	wintyika	who?
minyang	minja-	minya	minha	what?
ngadhu	ngadhu	ngaya	ngathu	I
ngali	ngalii	ngali	ngali	we two
ngiyanhi	ngiyanu / ngiyani	ngiyaani	ngina	we (pl.)
ngindhu	ngindu	nginda	ngintu	you (sg.)
ngindhubula	ngindubula	ngindaali	ngupa	you two
ngindhugir	ngindugal	ngindaay	ngurta	you (pl.)

== See also ==
- Central New South Wales languages
