= Kalamaia =

Indigenous people of Western Australia

The Kalamaia are an Aboriginal Australian people of the Wheatbelt and Goldfields-Esperance regions of Western Australia.

== Country ==
According to Norman Tindale, Kalamaia lands stretched over some 33,900 square miles (88,000 km^{2}). Their eastward extension ran to Bullabulling, while the northern boundaries lay around Youanmi, Lake Barlee, and Pigeon Rocks. To the west, their frontier was in the areas covered by Burracoppin, Mukinbudin, Kalannie, and Lake Moore. Their southern flank went to Mount Holland in the Parker Range. A term Jawan is applied to northwestern portions of tribe from. These lands included places like Boorabbin and Southern Cross.

== Social organization and customs ==
The Kalamaia figure in the forefront of those tribes that included circumcision in their initiation ceremonies, and the called contiguous southwestern tribes which did not share this rite Mudia/Mudila/Mudilja, a pejorative word referring to their physical states. Another term for such Mudiya was Minang ((people of the) south). Daisy Bate's also refers to the tribes that occupied southern cross as Eastern Meenung with their territory ending near Boorabbin.

== Alternative names ==
- Ka'la:mai, Kalamaya, Kalamai
- Kaprun
- Jungaa (meaning "men")
- Jungal
- Yungar, Youngar, Youngal
- Takalako (Njakinjaki exonym)
- Njindango
- Natingero
- Jawan (term used of Kalamaia clans north of Mukinbudin)
- Jaburu ("north")
- Yabro

== Sources ==
- "AIATSIS map of Indigenous Australia". AIATSIS. 14 May 2024.
- "Tindale Tribal Boundaries" (PDF). Department of Aboriginal Affairs, Western Australia. September 2016. Archived from the original (PDF) on 8 March 2016.
- Tindale, Norman Barnett (1974). "Kalamaia (WA)". Aboriginal Tribes of Australia: Their Terrain, Environmental Controls, Distribution, Limits, and Proper Names. Australian National University Press. ISBN 978-0-708-10741-6. Archived from the original on 20 March 2020.
