= Phyllis Kaberry =

Australian anthropologist

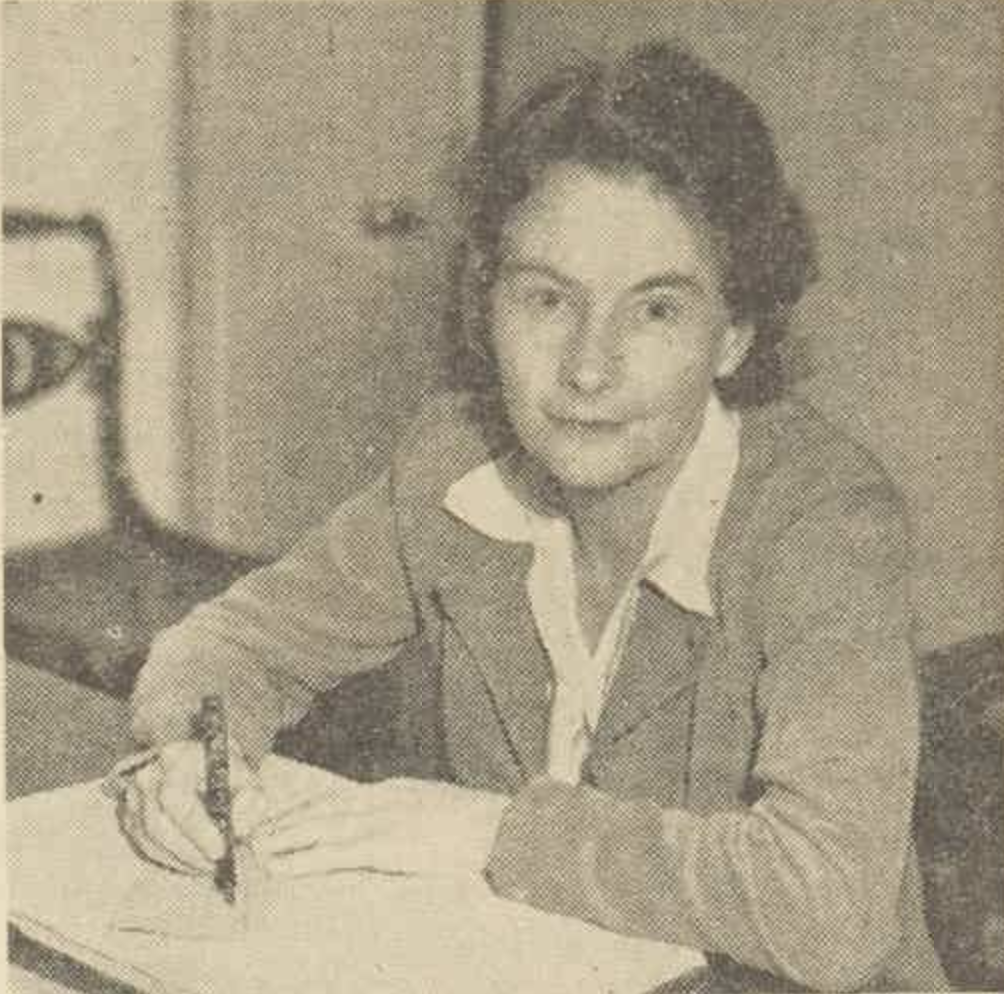
- Phyllis Kaberry in 1946.
- Born: Phyllis Mary Kaberry; 17 September 1910; San Francisco, California
- Died: 31 October 1977 (aged 67); London, England
- Education: University of Sydney; London School of Economics
- Known for: Aboriginal Woman: Sacred and Profane
- Awards: Sterling Fellowship, Carnegie Fellowship
- Scientific career
- Thesis: The Position of Aboriginal Women (1938)

Phyllis Mary Kaberry (17 September 1910 – 31 October 1977) was a social anthropologist who dedicated her work to the study of women in various societies. Particularly with her work in both Australia and Africa, she paved the way for a feminist approach in anthropological studies. Her research on the sacred life and significant role of women in Australian Aboriginal culture proved to be a controversial topic, as anthropology during her years of early fieldwork was male-dominated, filled with the misconceptions that men were the superior in any aspect of life. Contributing proof of women's significance to societal development and organisation, Kaberry was an influential and significant anthropologist.

== Early life and education ==
Kaberry was born in San Francisco to architect Lewis Kaberry (1878–1962) and Hettie Emily Kaberry (née Coggins; 1884–1975). Her parents were British immigrants, originally from Yorkshire. They emigrated not long before Kaberry's birth. Both were Christian Scientists. In 1913, Kaberry, her parents and two brothers moved to New South Wales, Australia, and eventually to Sydney. Kaberry attended the Fort Street Girls' High School.

Kaberry attended the University of Sydney in 1930, graduating with a BA in English and philosophy with an emphasis on Latin and history in 1933, and a MA in anthropology in 1934, with first-class honors. She then did field work with the Aboriginal peoples in northern Australia from 1934 to 1936, completing her PhD in anthropology at London School of Economics with the doctoral thesis, The position of women in an Australian aboriginal society in 1939 under Bronislaw Malinowski.

== Academic career ==
The University of Sydney was the first university in Australia to teach anthropology. The university was once an academic home to anthropologists such as A.P. Elkin, Raymond Firth, Ian Hogbin, A.R. Radcliffe-Brown, and Camilla Wedgwood. Kaberry studied under A.P. Elkin, a firm believer that female anthropologists were able to give a unique and beneficial perspective of women in various societies – a subject neglected during this time.

During her first years as a graduate student, Kaberry took an interest in New Guinea. Her master's thesis was the result of this interest, and was a survey of the effects of government policies on native conditions. Such an issue would also be seen in her later work in Australia and Africa. She later renewed her Melanesian interests after 1939 when she travelled to New Guinea to study the social organisation among the Abelam people of the Sepik District. She became curious in Melanesian food, specifically the central role yams played. World War II shortened her stay.

=== Research in Kimberley region of Western Australia ===
After completing her master's degree in anthropology, Kaberry received a grant from the Australian National Research Council (ANRC) to conduct research within the country. Her advisor, Elkin, suggested her fieldwork reside in the Kimberley region of Western Australia to study the cultures of the Aboriginal groups there. Elkin was a large advocate for the humane treatment and preservation of the native Australian populations – his views driven by his awareness of poor living conditions, maltreatment, and the gradual erasing of their traditional beliefs and values. Following Elkin's advice, Kaberry travelled to the Kimberley region. Like many anthropologists, Kaberry dealt with difficult conditions, which she embraced. Conducting research among cattle and mission stations, she encountered language barriers and constant resettlement due to seasonal migrations – hence a mobile lifestyle.

Adopting a participant observation approach, Kaberry shifted between multiple groups of people, becoming deeply involved with the daily lifestyles of the women. Often needing a translator, she chose the most outspoken woman of each group to assist her with translation as well as a way to entice other women into speaking about private aspects of Aboriginal female life. Much of her work was dependent on the two distinct seasons. During the dry season, Kaberry resided in the cattle and mission stations collecting genealogies by interviewing women from various camps. Kaberry questioned the accuracy of her research of Aboriginal tradition during the dry season. This was because the lifestyle within the cattle and mission stations established by non-natives was altered by European contact. She found that Aboriginal traditional life was more prominent in the wet season. Kaberry witnessed traditional ceremonies and real customs – an opportunity to see "native life" as it once was. Over the roughly three years that she studied the Aboriginal society of the Kimberley region, she focused on kinship, religion, the economic and social organisation of women, as well as the influence of European contact.

After returning from the field, she enrolled in the London School of Economics after receiving a scholarship. In 1938, she received her PhD in anthropology, and one year later published Aboriginal Woman Sacred and Profane. This book had a quiet but strong impact on women studies in the field of anthropology. At the time of publication, anthropology was widely male dominated, and thus her book received great amounts of criticism for suggesting that women were equal to that of men and possessed their own value of sacredness. At this time, Aboriginal women were seen as purely erotic beings or "domesticated cows" and were thought to have little influence in cultural development, devoid of a sacred life with their institutions defined as inferior to those of males. Although he was interested in obtaining information on the lives of women in native societies, even Kaberry's mentor, Elkin, exhibited views that agreed with the common belief of women inferiority. Aboriginal Woman Sacred and Profane disputed these ideas:

Until recently, aboriginal woman has occupied rather an obscure place in Australian anthropology; and in popular imagination, at least, she has too often been lost to view beneath the burdens imposed upon her by her menfolk. There has been little attempt to analyse the extent to which she participates in religion, the nature and importance of her contribution to the tribal economy. It was with the object of making a more specific study of the position of women in an aboriginal community, that at the suggestion of Professor Elkin, I carried out research in North-West Australia [...] In its original form my material was presented as a thesis for the degree of Doctor of Philosophy at the London School of Economics in 1938; but since then it has been revised and abridged and the title changed to one that sums up my attempt to portray aboriginal woman as she really is – a complex social personality, having her own prerogatives, duties, problems, beliefs, rituals, and point of view; making the adjustments that the social, local, and totemic organisation require of her, and at the same time exercising a certain freedom of choice in matters affecting her own interests and desires [...] Nevertheless they possess totems, have spiritual affiliations with the sacred past, and perform their own sacred rites from which the men are excluded [...] we have no grounds for assuming on the data now available, that the men represent the sacred element in the community and the women the profane element. (p. xix -xxii)

Kaberry recorded sacred ceremonies among women and exhibited the integral part they play within society. Her book was one of three focusing on the Aboriginals of Australia by anthropologists during the 1930s, as well as one of few that described native women worldwide. No doubt, she set the scene for future women studies, a field that was strongly neglected until women's movements later in the century.

=== Malinowski and culture contact consequences ===
Awarded a Sterling Fellowship, Kaberry went to Yale University to present lectures on her research in Australia and Melanesia. There she met with Bronisław Malinowski once again, her mentor at the London School of Economics. Kaberry and Malinowski shared an interest in culture contact and its consequences. Both agreed to write a book together on the subject, however Malinowski died before it was finished. With his notes in hand, Kaberry completed the project in 1945, entitled The Dynamics of Cultural Change. Kaberry had much admiration for Malinowski, and later dedicated Aboriginal Woman Sacred and Profane to him. As stated in her book:

I have dedicated this book to Professor Malinowski in acknowledgment of my debt to him as an anthropologist, as one who, without sacrificing scientific objectivity and integrity to fact, has been able to approach the study of culture and civilization with the imagination and sensitiveness of an artist. (p. xxv)

Almost twenty years later she wrote "A Glimpse of Malinowski in Retrospect" for the Journal of the Anthropological Society in Oxford.

=== Research in Bamenda region of Cameroon ===
Kaberry moved back to London, and eventually received a request from the Colonial Social Science Research Council to do research in the Bamenda region of Cameroon. The Council questioned the low development and malnutrition in this colonised region and requested Kaberry's anthropological services. Funded by the British government, Kaberry travelled to Bamenda, living among the Nso'. Here, she formed close relationships with those that she worked with. The Nso' highly valued her friendship and the issues she helped to resolve within their community. In 1946, the loss of land was becoming a reality to the Nso' due to colonial policies. Kaberry voiced her concerns to the British, in which the problem was eventually resolved. Relieved and grateful, the Nso' made Kaberry a queen mother – a title Kaberry cherished greatly.

Kaberry spent close to a total of forty-six months in Bamenda between 1945 and 1963 partly in collaboration with Sally Chilver. In 1952 she wrote Women of the Grasslands, describing the economic position of Nso' women. This publication did not receive as much criticism as her former book, but was yet another important movement towards a feminist approach in the field of anthropology.

For the latter part of her academic career, Kaberry taught at University College London as a lecturer and later as a reader. One year after her retirement, she died of accidental alcohol poisoning in her London home at sixty-seven years old. Informed of Kaberry's death, the Nso' community she had worked with throughout the years performed a mourning ceremony in her honour, and ten years later founded the Kaberry Research Centre within their region. At Oxford University, the Centre for Cross-Cultural Research on Women hosts a memorial lecture every three years, honouring her contributions to women's studies.

== Contributions ==
Phyllis Mary Kaberry was a pioneer for the study of women in the field of anthropology. For her to overcome the constant criticisms of her work was a battle within academia. Her passion and dedication towards erasing the misconceptions of the value of women within different societies has greatly benefited the future of the anthropological field of study. Kaberry recognised women's significant contributions within their communities, proving that they are not confined to the shadow of men. Her work has influenced future generations of anthropologists, including Sandy Toussaint of the University of Western Australia, and author of Phyllis Kaberry and Me.

Kaberry Place, in the Canberra Suburb of Chisholm, is named in her honour.

== Awards and fellowships ==
- Yale Sterling Fellowship
- Carnegie Fellowship
- Rivers Memorial Medal of the Royal Anthropological Institute
- Wellcome Medal in Applied Anthropology

== Footnotes ==
¹ The Nso' of Cameroon are also known as the Nsaw. In Kaberry's book Women of the Grasslands, she refers to them as Nsaw.
