= A. P. Elkin =

Australian anthropologist (1891–1979)

The Reverend Dr Peter Elkin CMG
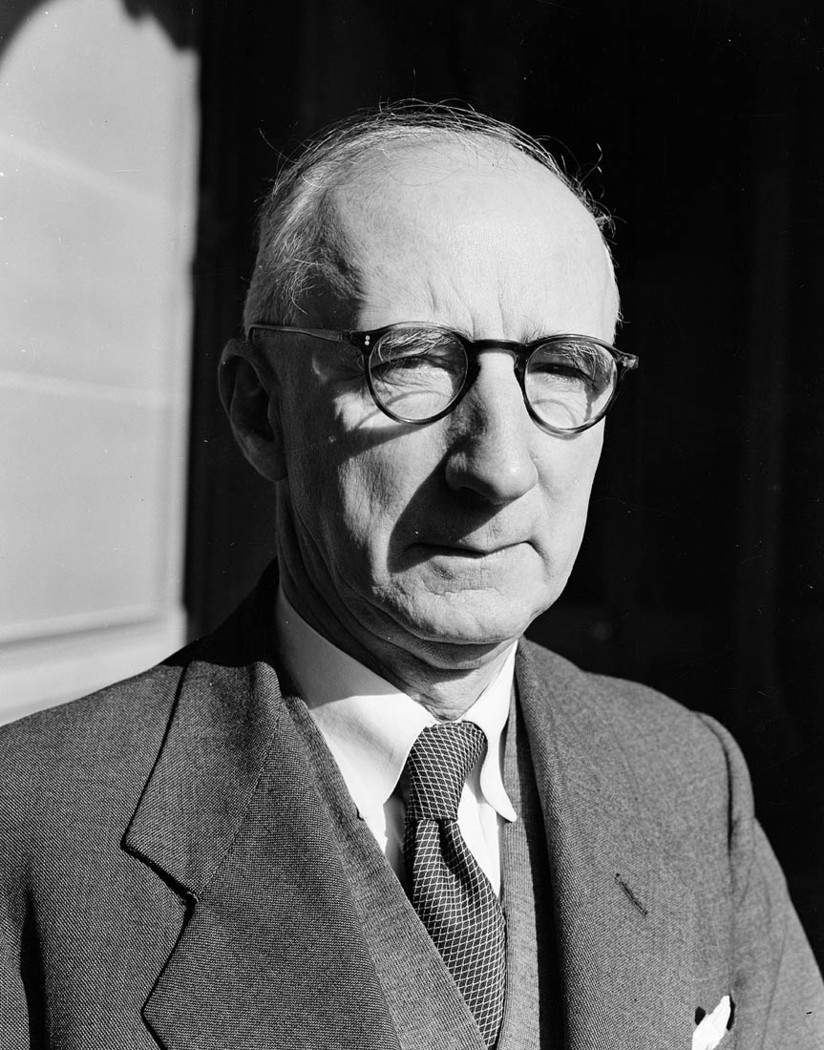
- Elkin in 1955
- Born: 27 March 1891; Maitland, Colony of New South Wales
- Died: 9 July 1979 (aged 88); Sydney, New South Wales, Australia
- Education: Sydney; UCL
- Occupation: Anthropologist
- Spouse: Sara Thompson (m. 1922)

Adolphus Peter Elkin (27 March 1891 – 9 July 1979), known as A. P. Elkin, was an Australian anthropologist and Anglican clergyman. He was an influential anthropologist during the mid twentieth century and a proponent of the assimilation of Indigenous Australians.

== Early life ==
Elkin was born at West Maitland, New South Wales. His father, Reuben Elkin, was an English Jew and worked as a salesman; his mother, Ellen Wilhelmina Bower, was a seamstress of German ancestry. His parents were divorced in 1901, his mother died the next year and he was then brought up by his maternal grandparents as an Anglican. He went to school at Singleton and at Maitland East Boys' High School. After finishing school he worked in banks in New South Wales, but then won a theological scholarship to St Paul's College, University of Sydney, where he graduated with a Bachelor of Arts in 1915.

== Clerical and anthropological career ==
Elkin was ordained deacon in 1915 and priest in 1916. From 1916 to 1919 he worked in the Anglican diocese of Newcastle and he then taught at St John's Theological College, Armidale, under Ernest Henry Burgmann. Elkin became interested in Australian Aboriginal culture and although no anthropology was taught in Australia at the time, his master's thesis—which he completed successfully in 1922—was on this subject and he lectured on it at St John's. In 1922 he married Sara (Sally) Thompson, an Irish nursing sister whom he had met during an influenza epidemic. He was Rector of St John the Evangelist Church, Wollombi from 1922 and 1925 and during this period he also lectured for the University of Sydney in the Hunter Region on Aboriginal culture.

In 1925, Elkin resigned from his post at Wollombi and began studying anthropology at University College, London under Grafton Elliot Smith, where he earned a PhD in 1927. In 1927 the anthropologist Alfred Radcliffe-Brown helped Elkin to gain Rockefeller funding to work on Australian culture in the Kimberley, Western Australia. In 1928, he was appointed as Rector of St James' Anglican Church, Morpeth on the basis that he could continue with his anthropology. By this time St John's College had moved from Armidale to Morpeth and he also became co-editor of the college's Morpeth Review. He also became editor of Oceania from its founding in 1931 until his death. He visited many missions in Western Australia, including the Mount Margaret Mission, part of the Australian Aborigines Mission (later United Aborigines Mission) in 1930 on behalf of the Australian National Research Council.

Elkin became an activist for the amelioration of Aboriginal Australians, whom he saw as best served by being assimilated into European society. In 1934 he successfully lobbied for the reprieve of Dhakiyarr (Tuckiar) Wirrpanda, a Yolngu man who had been sentenced to death for murder. In 1938 he played a key role in the drafting of the New Deal for Aborigines, a landmark policy statement announced by interior minister John McEwen on whom he was an influential advisor.

== Professor of anthropology ==
Following Radcliffe-Brown's resignation from University of Sydney, Elkin was appointed lecturer-in-charge of the anthropology department in late 1932 and he was promoted to professor in December 1933. Until his retirement in 1956, he effectively dominated Australian anthropology, advised governments, trained administrators sent to Papua New Guinea, while also continuing his field research. He was president of the Association for the Protection of Native Races from 1933 to 1962. He was vice-president of the Aborigines Protection Board of New South Wales (renamed Aborigines Welfare Board in 1940).

== Retirement and honours ==
In 1957 he was awarded the Mueller Medal by the Australian and New Zealand Association for the Advancement of Science.

After his retirement in 1966, Elkin was appointed a Companion of the Order of St Michael and St George (CMG) in the 1966 Birthday Honours. In 1970 he received an honorary doctorate of letters from the University of Sydney.

== Death ==
Elkin died at a meeting at the university, survived by his wife and two sons.

== See also ==
- List of didgeridoo players
