= Pama–Nyungan languages =

Aboriginal Australian language family

Pama–Nyungan
- Geographic distribution: Most of mainland Australia, with the exception of northern parts of Northern Territory and Western Australia
- Linguistic classification: Macro-Pama–Nyungan?: Greater Pama–Nyungan; Pama–Nyungan
- Proto-language: Proto-Pama–Nyungan
- Subdivisions: Yolŋu, Ngarna, Kalkatungic, Mayi, Paman, Kala Lagaw Ya, Yidiny, Dyirbalic, Maric, Waka–Kabic, Durubulic, Bandjalangic, Gumbaynggiric, Anewan, Wiradhuric, Yuin–Kuric, Gippsland, Yotayotic, Kulinic, Lower Murray, Thura-Yura, Mirniny, Nyungar, Kartu, Kanyara–Mantharta, Ngayarta, Marrngu, Ngumpin–Yapa, Warumungu, Wati, Arandic, Kalali, Karnic, Yardli, Muruwari, Paakantyi; plus unclassified languages

Language codes
- Glottolog: pama1250
- Linguasphere: 29-A
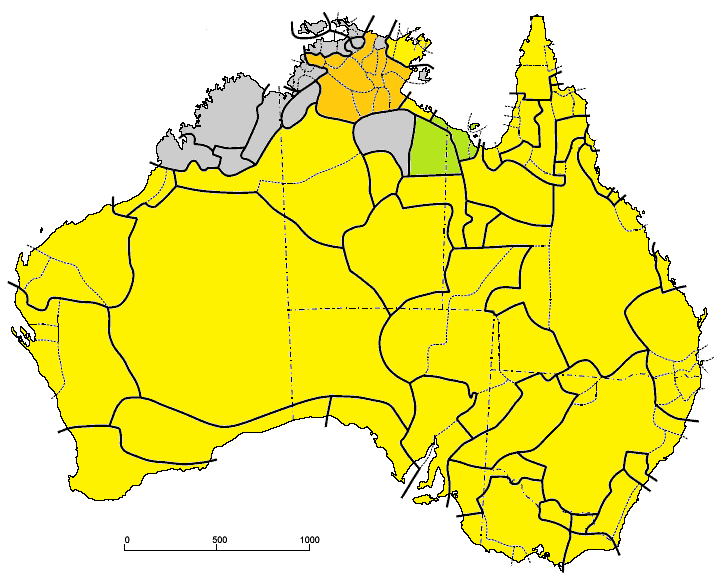
- Pama–Nyungan languages (yellow); Other Macro-Pama–Nyungan (green and orange)

The Pama–Nyungan languages (/pama ɲuŋan/ [ˌpɐmə ˈnjʊŋən] PAH-mə-NYOONG-ən) are the most widespread family of Australian Aboriginal and Torres Strait Islander languages, comprising 306 of the 400 Aboriginal languages of Australia. The name "Pama–Nyungan" is a merism: it is derived from the two end-points of the range, the Pama languages of northeast Australia (where the word for 'man' is pama) and the Nyungar languages of southwest Australia (where the word for 'man' is nyungar).

The other language families indigenous to the continent of Australia are often referred to, by exclusion, as non-Pama–Nyungan languages, though this is not a taxonomic term. The Pama–Nyungan family accounts for most of the geographic spread, most of the Aboriginal population, and the greatest number of languages. Most of the Pama–Nyungan languages are spoken by small ethnic groups of hundreds of speakers or fewer. Many languages have been silenced by colonisation, and almost all remaining ones are endangered in some way. Only in the central inland portions of the continent do Pama–Nyungan languages continue to be spoken vigorously by the entire community.

The first descriptions of languages from this family were found in missionary grammars from the early 19th century, but the Pama–Nyungan family itself was identified and named only by Kenneth L. Hale in his work on the classification of Native Australian languages. Hale's research led him to the conclusion that of the Aboriginal Australian languages, one relatively closely interrelated family had spread and proliferated over most of the continent, while approximately a dozen other families were concentrated along the North coast.

== Typology ==
Evans and McConvell describe typical Pama–Nyungan languages such as Warlpiri as dependent-marking and exclusively suffixing languages that lack gender, while noting that some non-Pama–Nyungan languages such as Tangkic share this typology and some Pama–Nyungan languages like Yanyuwa, a head-marking and prefixing language with a complicated gender system, diverge from it.

== Reconstruction ==
Proto-Pama–Nyungan
- Reconstruction of: Pama–Nyungan
- Region: Gulf Plains, NE Australia
- Era: perhaps c. 3000 BCE

Proto-Pama–Nyungan may have been spoken as recently as about 5,000 years ago, much more recently than the 40,000 to 60,000 years indigenous Australians are believed to have been inhabiting Australia. How the Pama–Nyungan languages spread over most of the continent and displaced any pre-Pama–Nyungan languages is uncertain; one possibility is that language could have been transferred from one group to another along with culture and ritual. Given the relationship of cognates between groups, it seems that Pama–Nyungan has many of the characteristics of a sprachbund, indicating the antiquity of multiple waves of culture contact between groups. Dixon in particular has argued that the genealogical trees found with many language families do not fit in the Pama–Nyungan family.

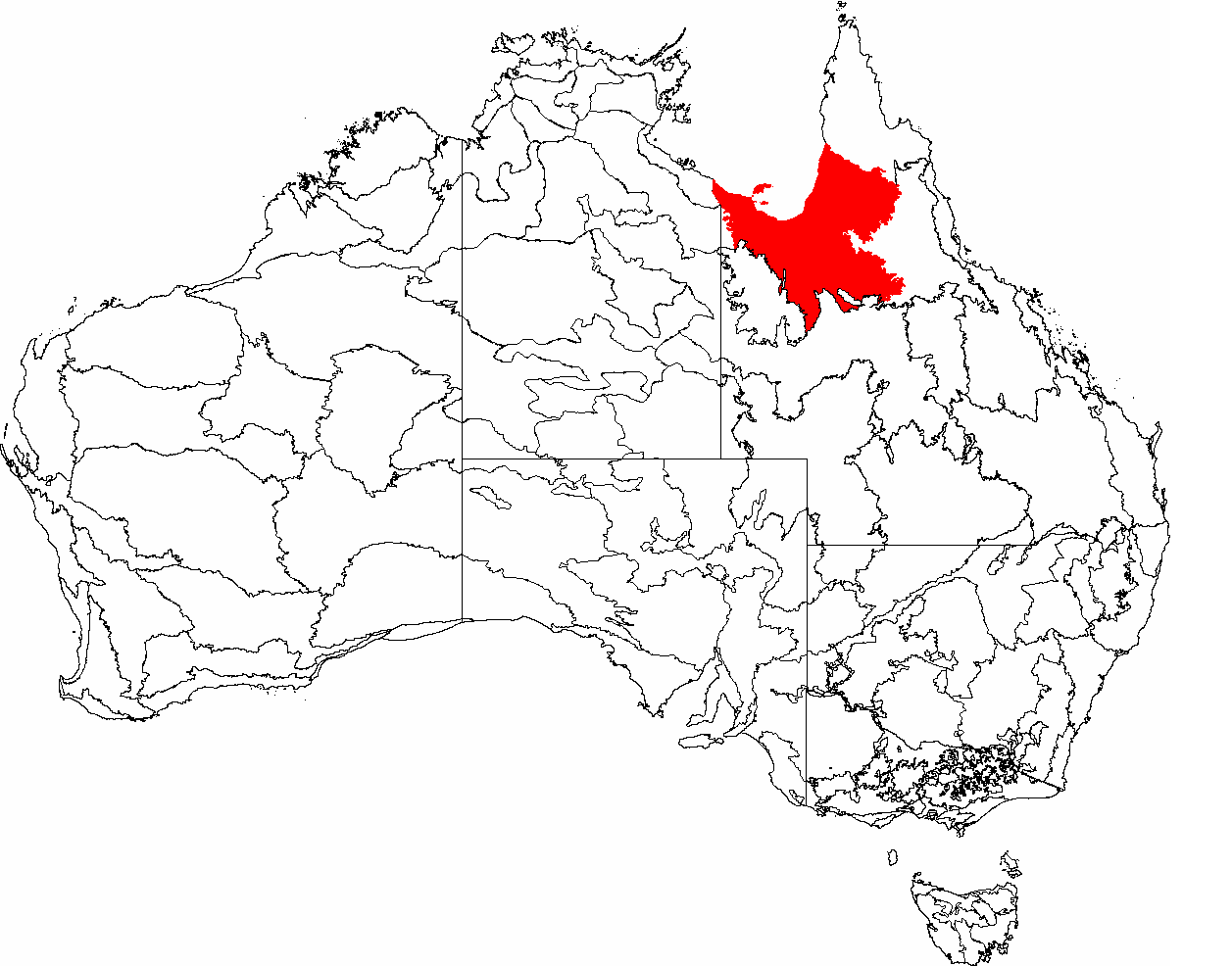
The Gulf Plains, the Proto-Pama–Nyungan homeland

Using computational phylogenetics, Bouckaert, Bowern & Atkinson posit a mid-Holocene expansion of Pama–Nyungan from the Gulf Plains of northeastern Australia.

== Phonotactics ==
Pama–Nyungan languages generally share several broad phonotactic constraints: single-consonant onsets, a lack of fricatives, and a lack of word-initial liquids (laterals and rhotics).

Voiced fricatives have developed in several scattered languages, such as Anguthimri, though often the sole alleged fricative is /ɣ/ and is analysed as an approximant /ɰ/ by other linguists. An exception is Kala Lagaw Ya, which acquired both fricatives and a voicing contrast in them and in its plosives from contact with Papuan languages. Several of the languages of Victoria allowed initial /l/, and one—Gunai—also allowed initial /r/ and consonant clusters /kr/ and /pr/, a trait shared with the Tasmanian languages across the Bass Strait.

== Classification ==
At the time of the European arrival in Australia, there were some 300 Pama–Nyungan languages divided across three dozen branches. What follows are the languages listed by Bowern; numbers in parentheses are the numbers of languages in each branch. These range from languages so distinct they are difficult to demonstrate as being in the same branch, to near-dialects whose differences are on par with those between the Scandinavian languages.

=== Traditional conservative classification ===
Down the east coast, from Cape York to the Bass Strait, there are:

- Kala Lagaw Ya (1)
- Paman (41)
- Yidiny (1)
- Dyirbalic (5)
- Maric (26)
- Waka–Kabic (5)
- Durubulic (5)
- Bandjalangic (4)
- Gumbaynggiric (2)
- Anewan (Nganyaywana) (1)
- Wiradhuric (Central NSW; inland of Yuin–Kuric) (5)
- Yuin–Kuric (14)
- Gippsland (5)

Continuing along the south coast, from Melbourne to Perth:

- Yotayotic (somewhat inland) (2)
- Kulinic (13)
- Lower Murray (9)
- Thura-Yura (8)
- Mirniny (2)
- Nyungic (SW) (11)

Up the west coast:

- Kartu (5)
- Kanyara–Mantharta (8)
- Ngayarta (12)
- Marrngu (3)

Cutting inland back to Paman, south of the northern non-Pama–Nyungan languages, are

- Ngumpin–Yapa (10)
- Warumungu (1)
- Warluwaric (5)
- Kalkatungic (2)
- Mayi (Mayabic) (7)

Encircled by these branches are:

- Wati (15), the large inland expanse in the west
- Arandic (9), in the north centre
- Karnic (18), in the west
- Yardli (Yarli) (3), in the west
- Muruwari (1)
- Baagandji (Darling; inland of Lower Murray) (2)

Separated to the north of the rest of Pama–Nyungan is

- Yolŋu (10)

Some of inclusions in each branch are only provisional, as many languages were silenced before they could be adequately documented. Not included are dozens of poorly attested languages, such as Barranbinja and the Lower Burdekin languages.

A few more inclusive groups that have been proposed, such as Northeast Pama–Nyungan (Pama–Maric), Central New South Wales, and Southwest Pama–Nyungan, appear to be geographical rather than genealogical groups.

=== Bowern & Atkinson ===
Bowern & Atkinson use computational phylogenetics to calculate the following classification:

- Pama–Nyungan
  - Southeastern
    - Victorian
      - Lower Murray languages
      - Victorian
        - Eastern Victoria
          - Yorta-Yorta
          - Gunai
          - Pallanganmiddang
        - Macro-Kulin
          - Kulin languages
          - Bungandidj
    - New South Wales
      - Yuin-Kuric languages
      - Central New South Wales languages
    - North Coast
      - Durubalic languages
      - Yugambeh-Bundjalung languages
      - Gumbaynggiric languages
      - Waka-Kabic languages
  - Northern
    - Gulf
      - Kalkatungic languages
      - Mayabic languages
    - Pama-Maric (weak support)
      - Paman languages
      - Kalaw Lagaw Ya
      - Maric languages
        - (?) Dyirbalic languages
  - Central
    - Arandic–Thura-Yura
      - Arandic languages
      - Thura-Yura languages
    - Southwest Queensland
      - Karnic languages
      - Northwest NSW
        - Yarli
        - Paakantyi
  - Western
    - Yolŋu-Ngarna (weak support)
      - Yolŋu languages
      - Ngarna languages
    - Nyungic languages
      - Desert Nyungic
        - Marrngu languages
        - Ngumpin–Yapa languages
          - Warumungu languages
        - Wati languages
      - Southwest Nyungic
        - Pilbara languages
          - Ngayarda languages
          - Kanyara-Mantharta languages
        - Kartu–Nhanda languages
        - Mirning languages
        - Nyunga languages
        - Yinggarda language

=== External relations ===
According to Nicholas Evans, the closest relative of Pama–Nyungan is the Garawan language family, followed by the small Tangkic family. He then proposes a more distant relationship with the Gunwinyguan languages in a macro-family he calls Macro-Pama–Nyungan. However, this has yet to be demonstrated to the satisfaction of the linguistic community.

== Validity ==
=== Dixon's scepticism ===
In his 1980 attempt to reconstruct Proto-Australian, R. M. W. Dixon reported that he was unable to find anything that reliably set Pama–Nyungan apart as a valid genetic group. Fifteen years later, he had abandoned the idea that Australian or Pama–Nyungan were families. He now sees Australian as a Sprachbund. Some of the small traditionally Pama–Nyungan families which have been demonstrated through the comparative method, or which in Dixon's opinion are likely to be demonstrable, include the following:

- North Cape York (Northern Paman, Umpila, Wik/Middle Paman: part of Paman)
- Yidinic (Dyaabugai and Yidiny: rejected by Bowern)
- Maric (some languages uncertain)
- Wiradhuric
- Yolngu
- Ngarna, a clear connection between Yanyuwa and Warluwara, Wagaya, Yindjilandji, Bularnu.
- Part of Yura

He asserts that Lower Murray (five families and isolates), Arandic (2 families, Kaytetye and Arrernte), and Kalkatungic (2 isolates) are small Sprachbunds.

Dixon's theories of Australian language diachrony have been based on a model of punctuated equilibrium (adapted from the eponymous model in evolutionary biology) wherein he claims Australian languages to be ancient and to have—for the most part—remained in unchanging equilibrium with the exception of sporadic branching or speciation events in the phylogenetic tree. Part of Dixon's objections to the Pama–Nyungan family classification is the lack of obvious binary branching points which are implicitly or explicitly entailed by his model.

=== Mainstream rejoinders ===
However, the papers in Bowern & Koch (2004) demonstrate about ten traditional groups, including Pama–Nyungan, and its sub-branches such as Arandic, using the comparative method.

In his last published paper from the same collection, Ken Hale describes Dixon's scepticism as an erroneous phylogenetic assessment which is "so bizarrely faulted, and such an insult to the eminently successful practitioners of Comparative Method Linguistics in Australia, that it positively demands a decisive riposte." In the same work Hale provides unique pronominal and grammatical evidence (with suppletion) as well as more than fifty basic-vocabulary cognates (showing regular sound correspondences) between the Proto-Northern-and-Middle Pamic (pNMP) family of the Cape York Peninsula on the Australian northeast coast and Proto-Ngayarta of the Australian west coast, some 3,000 km apart (as well as from many other languages), to support the Pama–Nyungan grouping, whose age he compares to that of Proto-Indo-European.

==== Bowern (2006) ====
Bowern offered an alternative to Dixon's binary phylogenetic-tree model based in the principles of dialect geography. Rather than discarding the notion that multiple subgroups of languages are genetically related due to the presence of multiple dialectal epicentres arranged around stark isoglosses, Bowern proposed that the non-binary-branching characteristics of Pama–Nyungan languages are precisely what we would expect to see from a language continuum in which dialects are diverging linguistically but remaining in close geographic and social contact. Bowern offered three main advantages of this geographical-continuum model over the punctuated equilibrium model:

First, there is a place for both divergence and convergence as processes of language change; punctuated equilibrium stresses convergence as the main mechanism of language change in Australia. Second, it makes Pama–Nyungan look much more similar to other areas of the world. We no longer have to assume that Australia is a special case. Third, and related to this, we do not have to assume in this model that there has been intensive diffusion of many linguistic elements that in other parts of the world are resistant to borrowing (such as shared irregularities).

==== Bowern & Atkinson (2012) ====
Additional methods of computational phylogenetics employed by Bowern and Atkinson uncovered that there were more binary-branching characteristics than initially thought. Instead of acceding to the notion that Pama–Nyungan languages do not share the characteristics of a binary-branching language family, the computational methods revealed that inter-language loan rates were not as atypically high as previously imagined and do not obscure the features that would allow for a phylogenetic approach. This finding functioned as a kind of rejoinder to Dixon's scepticism.

Our work puts to rest once and for all the claim that Australian languages are so exceptional that methods used elsewhere in the world do not work on this continent . The methods presented here have been used with Bantu, Austronesian, Indo-European, and Japonic languages (among others). Pama–Nyungan languages, like all languages, show a mixture of histories that reflect both contact and inheritance.

Bowern and Atkinson's computational model is currently the definitive model of Pama–Nyungan intra-relatedness and diachrony.

== See also ==
- Macro-Pama–Nyungan languages
