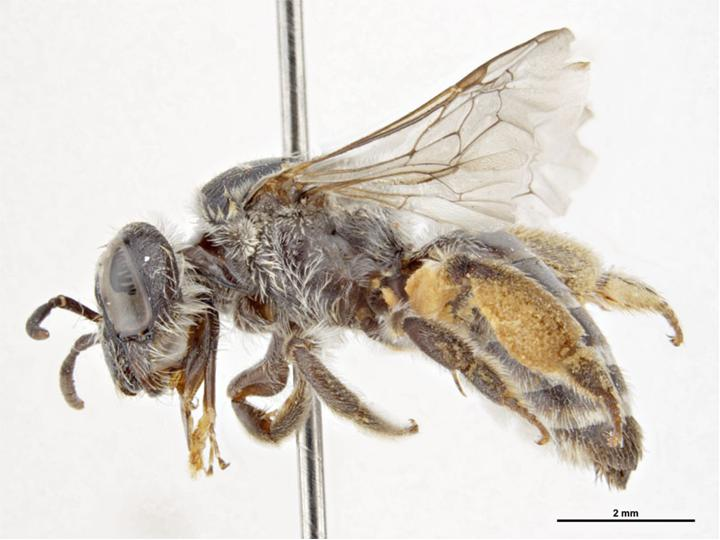
- Female

Scientific classification
- Kingdom: Animalia
- Phylum: Arthropoda
- Clade: Pancrustacea
- Class: Insecta
- Order: Hymenoptera
- Family: Colletidae
- Genus: Leioproctus
- Species: L. lanceolatus

Binomial name
- Leioproctus lanceolatus Houston, 1990

= Leioproctus lanceolatus =

Species of bee

Leioproctus lanceolatus, or Leioproctus (Leioproctus) lanceolatus, is a species of bee in the family Colletidae and subfamily Colletinae. It is endemic to Australia. It was described by Australian entomologist Terry Houston in 1990.

== Etymology ==
The specific epithet lanceolatus (Latin: "with a little lance") is an anatomical reference.

== Description ==
The male holotype body length is about 8.5 mm, head width 2.8 mm; female paratype body length 8.2 mm, head width 2.5 mm. Integumental colouration is black to dark brown; the hair is white to brown.

== Distribution and habitat ==
The species occurs in arid central Australia. The type locality is 11 km west of Banjawarn Homestead in Western Australia.

== Behaviour ==
The adults are flying mellivores. Flowering plants visited by the bees include Eremophila margarethae, Eremophila spathulata, Eremophila granitica, Eremophila battii and Eremophila willsii, as well as Dipteracanthus species.

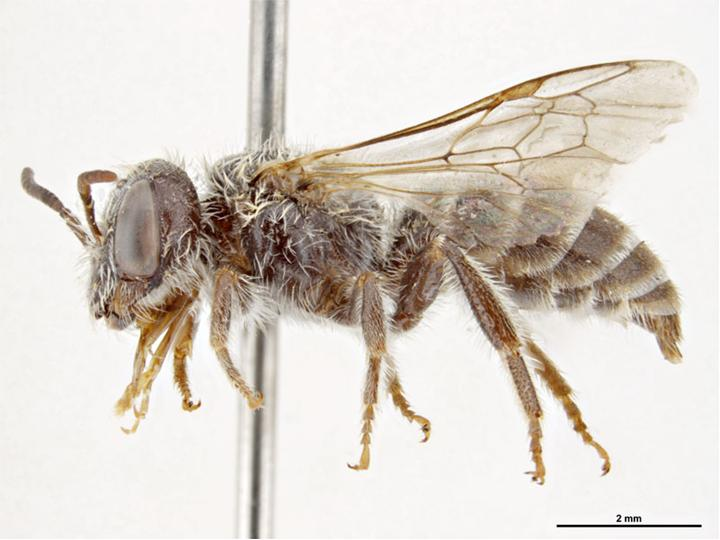
Male

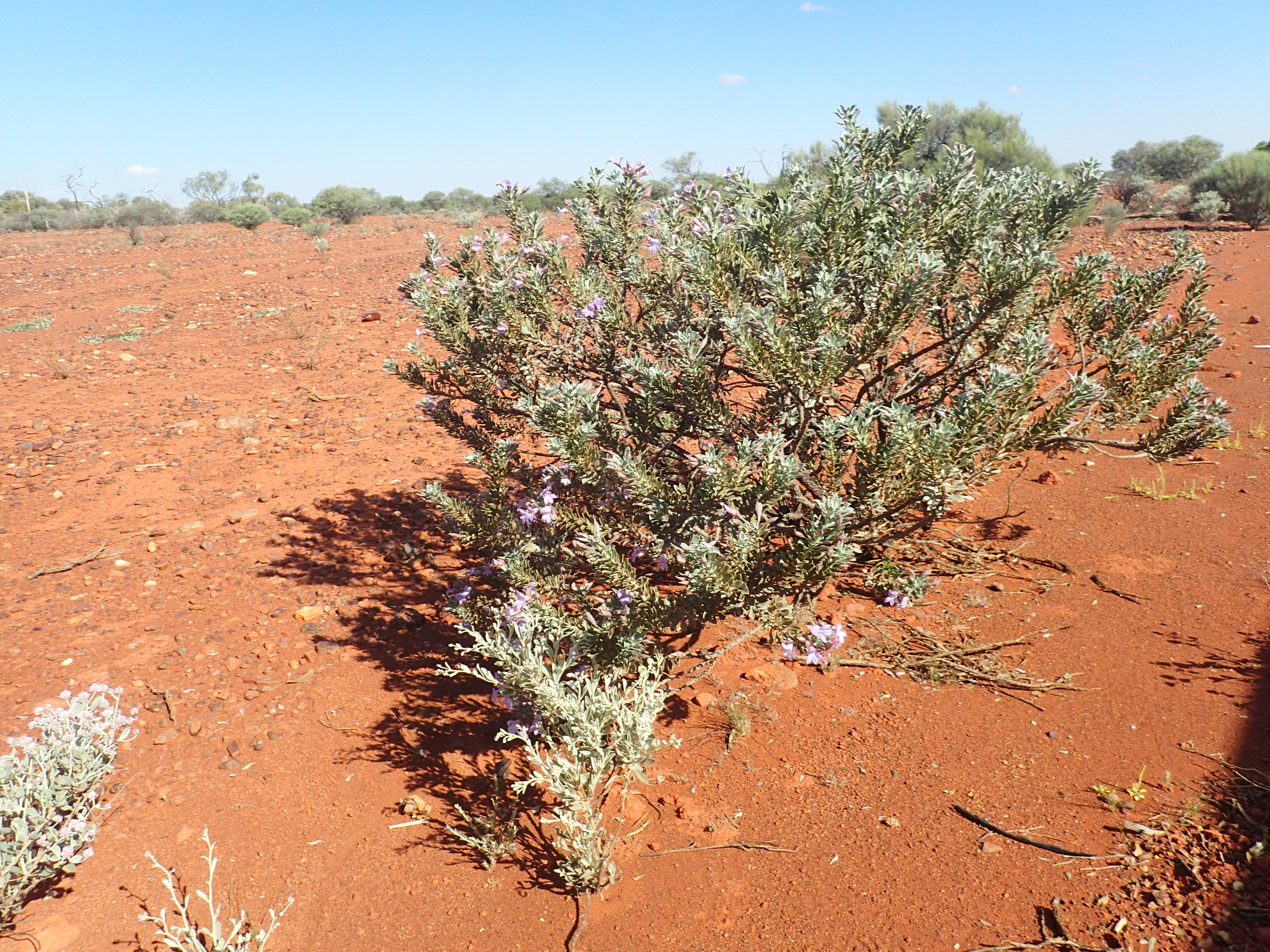
Eremophila spathulata, a forage plant of the bees
