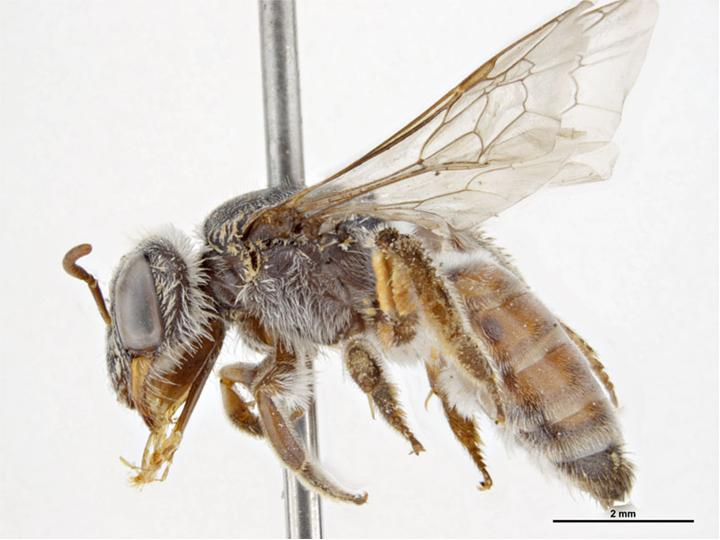
- Female

Scientific classification
- Kingdom: Animalia
- Phylum: Arthropoda
- Clade: Pancrustacea
- Class: Insecta
- Order: Hymenoptera
- Family: Colletidae
- Genus: Leioproctus
- Species: L. lucanus

Binomial name
- Leioproctus lucanus Houston, 1990

= Leioproctus lucanus =

Species of bee

Leioproctus lucanus, or Leioproctus (Leioproctus) lucanus, is a species of bee in the family Colletidae and subfamily Colletinae. It is endemic to Australia. It was described by Australian entomologist Terry Houston in 1990.

== Etymology ==
The specific epithet lucanus is an anatomical reference, likening the pincer-like mandibles of the males to those of some Lucanus beetles.

== Description ==
The male holotype body length is about 11 mm, head width 4.25 mm; female paratype body length 8.5 mm, head width 2.6 mm. Integumental colouration is mainly black; the hair is mainly white.

== Distribution and habitat ==
The species occurs in central Australia. The type locality is 2 km south of Hamilton Homestead in the Far North of South Australia.

== Behaviour ==
The adults are flying mellivores. Flowering plants visited by the bees include Eremophila willsii, Eremophila spathulata and Scaevola spinescens.

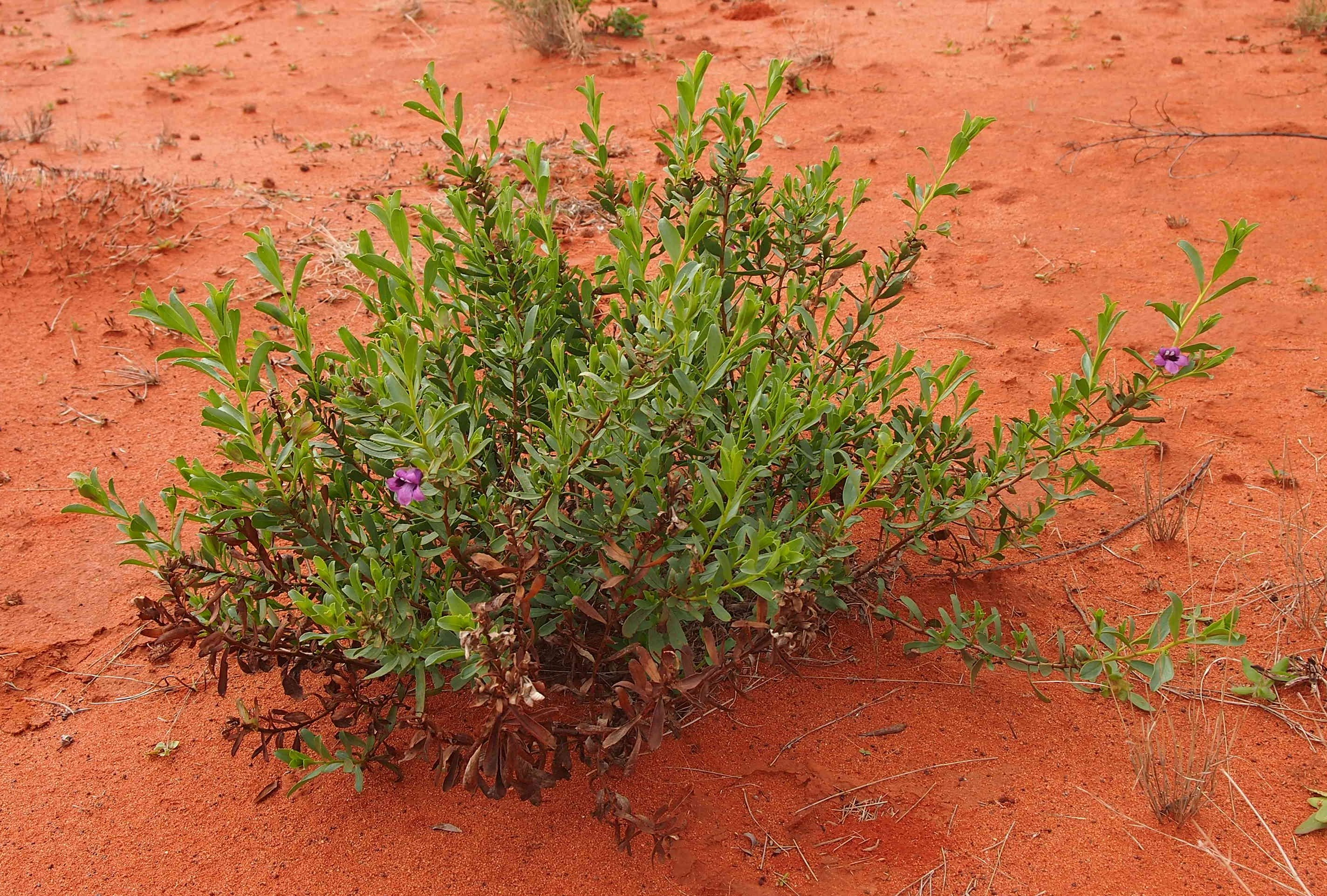
Eremophila willsii, a forage plant of the bees

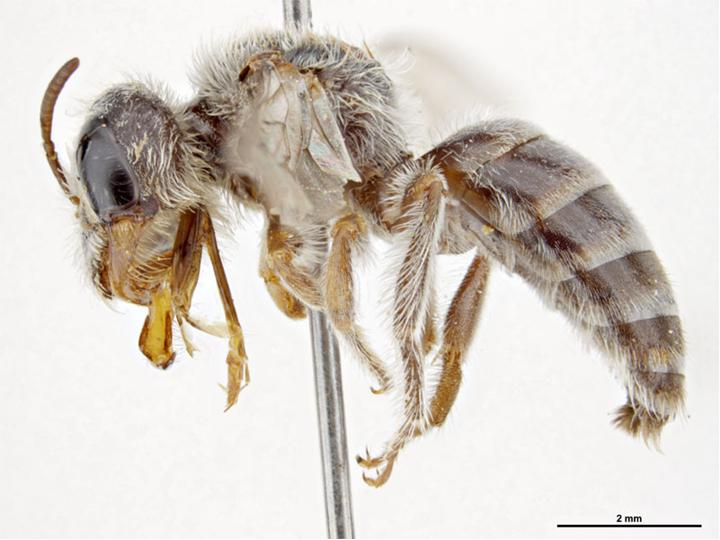
Male
