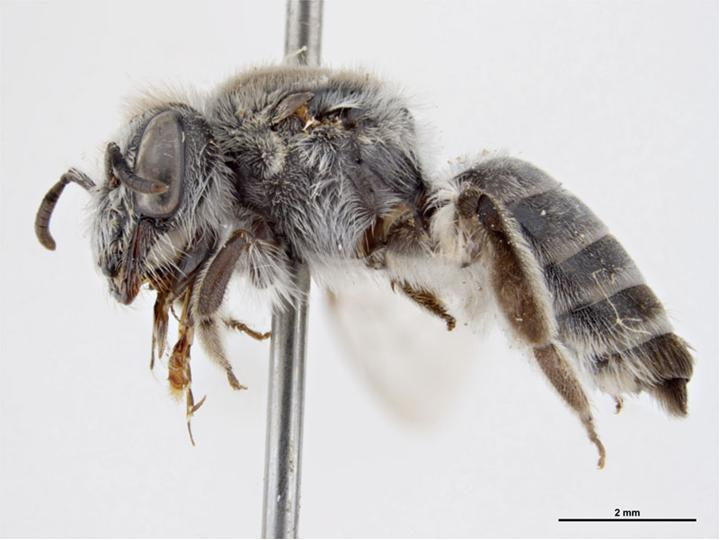
- Female

Scientific classification
- Kingdom: Animalia
- Phylum: Arthropoda
- Clade: Pancrustacea
- Class: Insecta
- Order: Hymenoptera
- Family: Colletidae
- Genus: Leioproctus
- Species: L. eremites

Binomial name
- Leioproctus eremites Houston, 1990

= Leioproctus eremites =

Species of bee

Leioproctus eremites, or Leioproctus (Leioproctus) eremites, is a species of bee in the family Colletidae and subfamily Colletinae. It is endemic to Australia. It was described by Australian entomologist Terry Houston in 1990.

== Etymology ==
The specific epithet eremites (Latin: "of the desert") is a habitat and forage plant reference.

== Description ==
The male holotype body length is about 11 mm; female paratype body length is about 8.5 mm. Integumental colouration is mainly black; the hair is white to brown.

== Distribution and habitat ==
The species occurs in north-west Western Australia between Newman, Cue and Carnarvon. The type locality is the Coppin Pool area, 30 km south of Mount Bruce, in the Pilbara region.

== Behaviour ==
The adults are flying mellivores. Flowering plants visited by the bees include Eremophila platycalyx, Eremophila cuneifolia and Ptilotus obovatus.

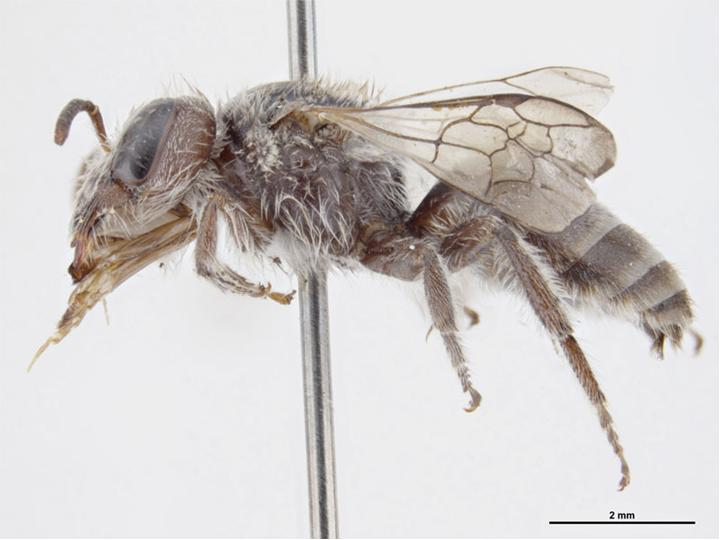
Male

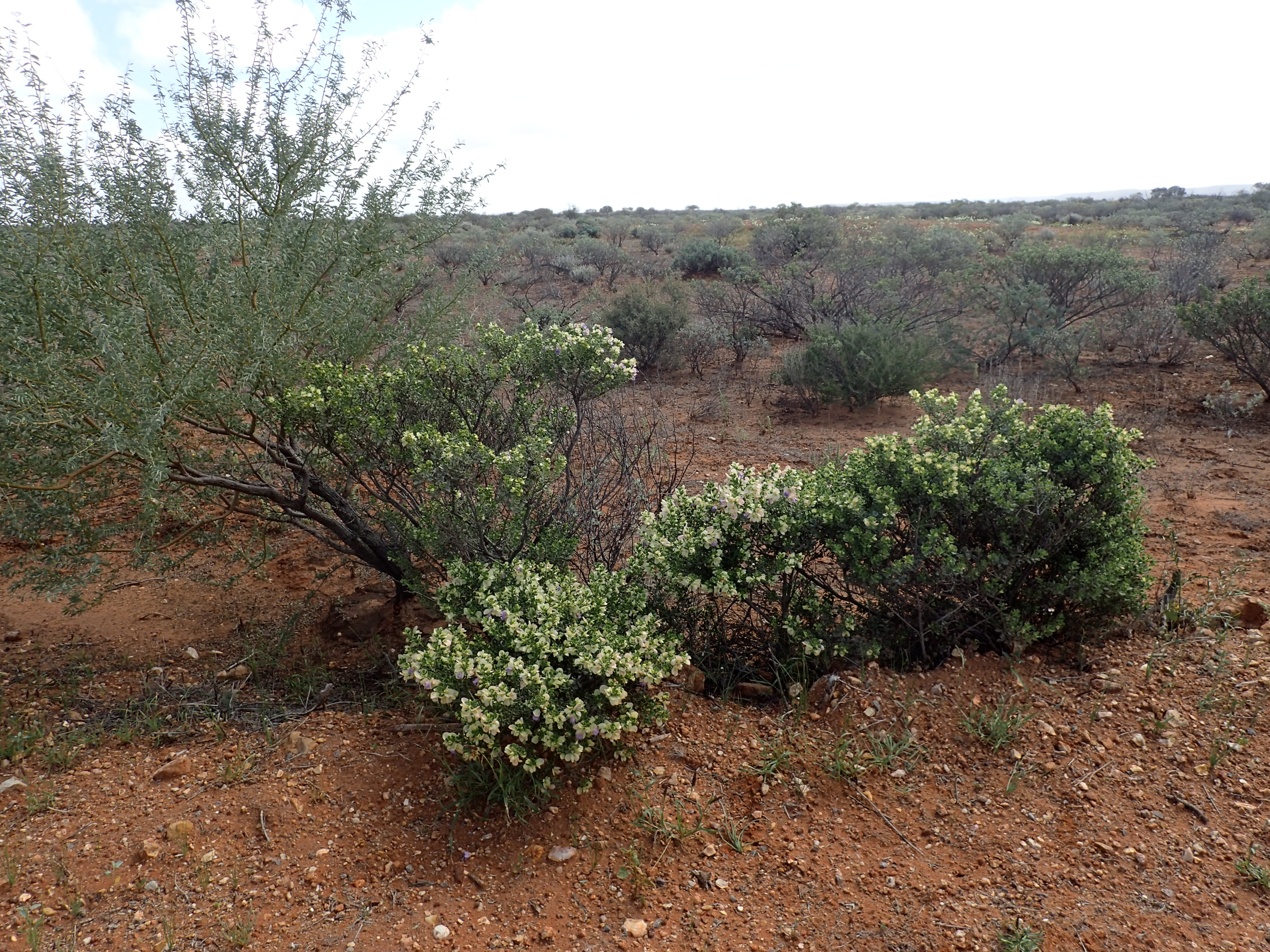
Eremophila cuneifolia (pinyuru), a forage plant of the bees
