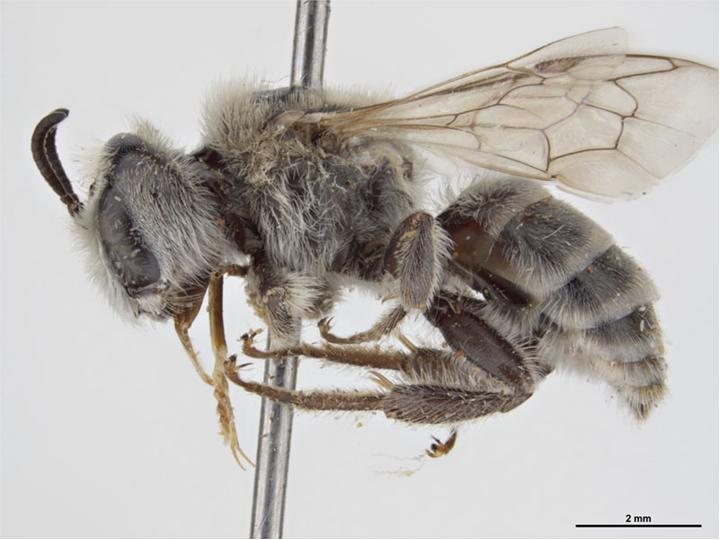
- Male

Scientific classification
- Kingdom: Animalia
- Phylum: Arthropoda
- Clade: Pancrustacea
- Class: Insecta
- Order: Hymenoptera
- Family: Colletidae
- Genus: Leioproctus
- Species: L. lucidicinctus

Binomial name
- Leioproctus lucidicinctus Houston, 1990

= Leioproctus lucidicinctus =

Species of bee

Leioproctus lucidicinctus, or Leioproctus (Leioproctus) lucidicinctus, is a species of bee in the family Colletidae and subfamily Colletinae. Endemic to Australia, it was described by Australian entomologist Terry Houston in 1990.

== Etymology ==
The specific epithet lucidicinctus (Latin: 'clear banded') is an anatomical reference to the tergal margins.

== Description ==
The male holotype body length is about 11 millimetres (0.43 in) with a head width of 3.0 mm (0.12 in); the female paratype body is 9 mm (0.35 in) long, with a head 2.8 mm (0.11 in) wide. Integumental colouration is mainly black; the hair is mainly white.

== Distribution and habitat ==
The species occurs in western and central Australia. The type locality is 57 kilometres (35 mi) east-north-east of Carnarvon, Western Australia.

== Behaviour ==
The adults are flying mellivores. Flowering plants visited by the bees include Eremophila crenulata and Eremophila willsii.

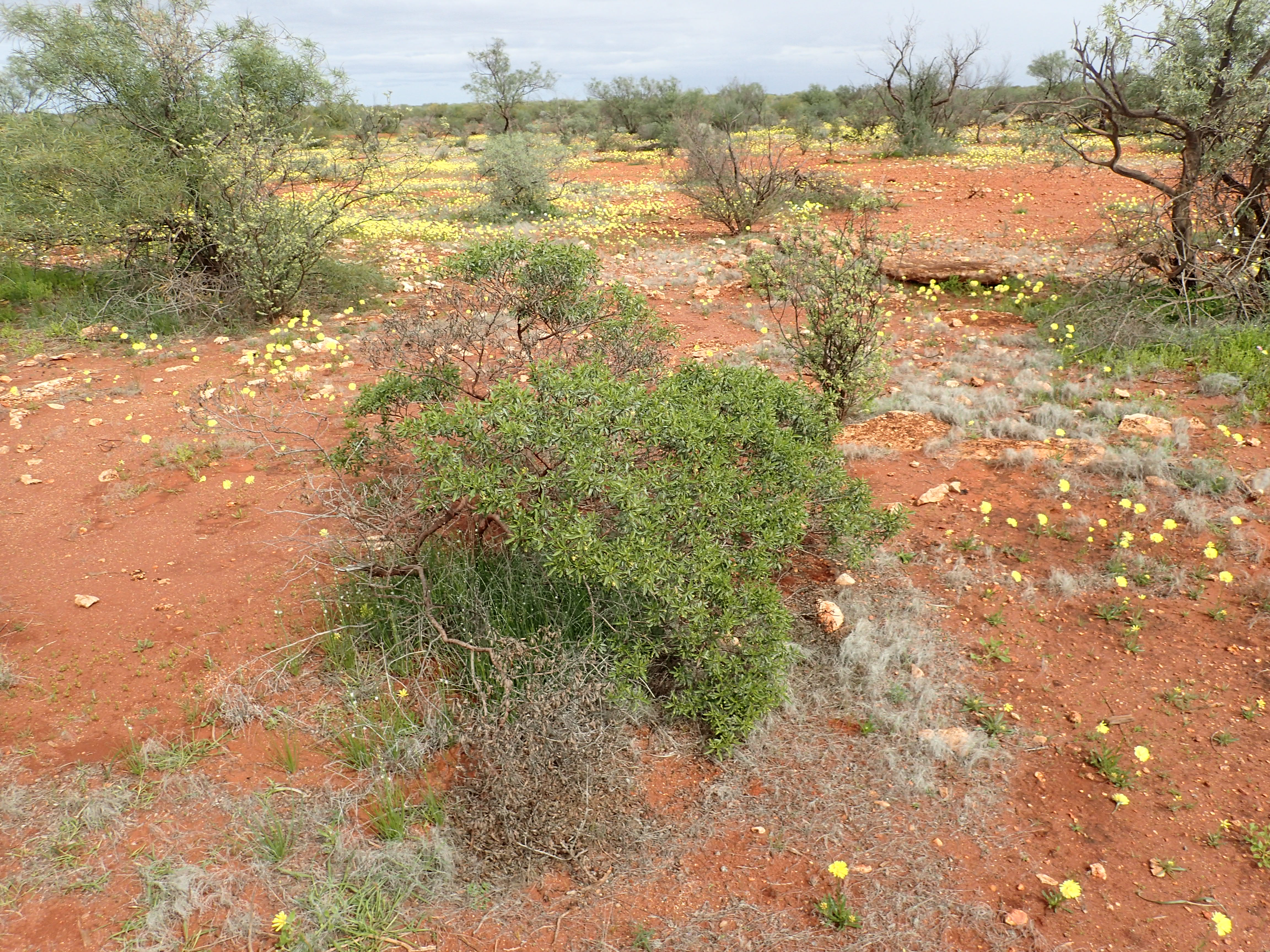
Eremophila crenulata, a forage plant of the bees

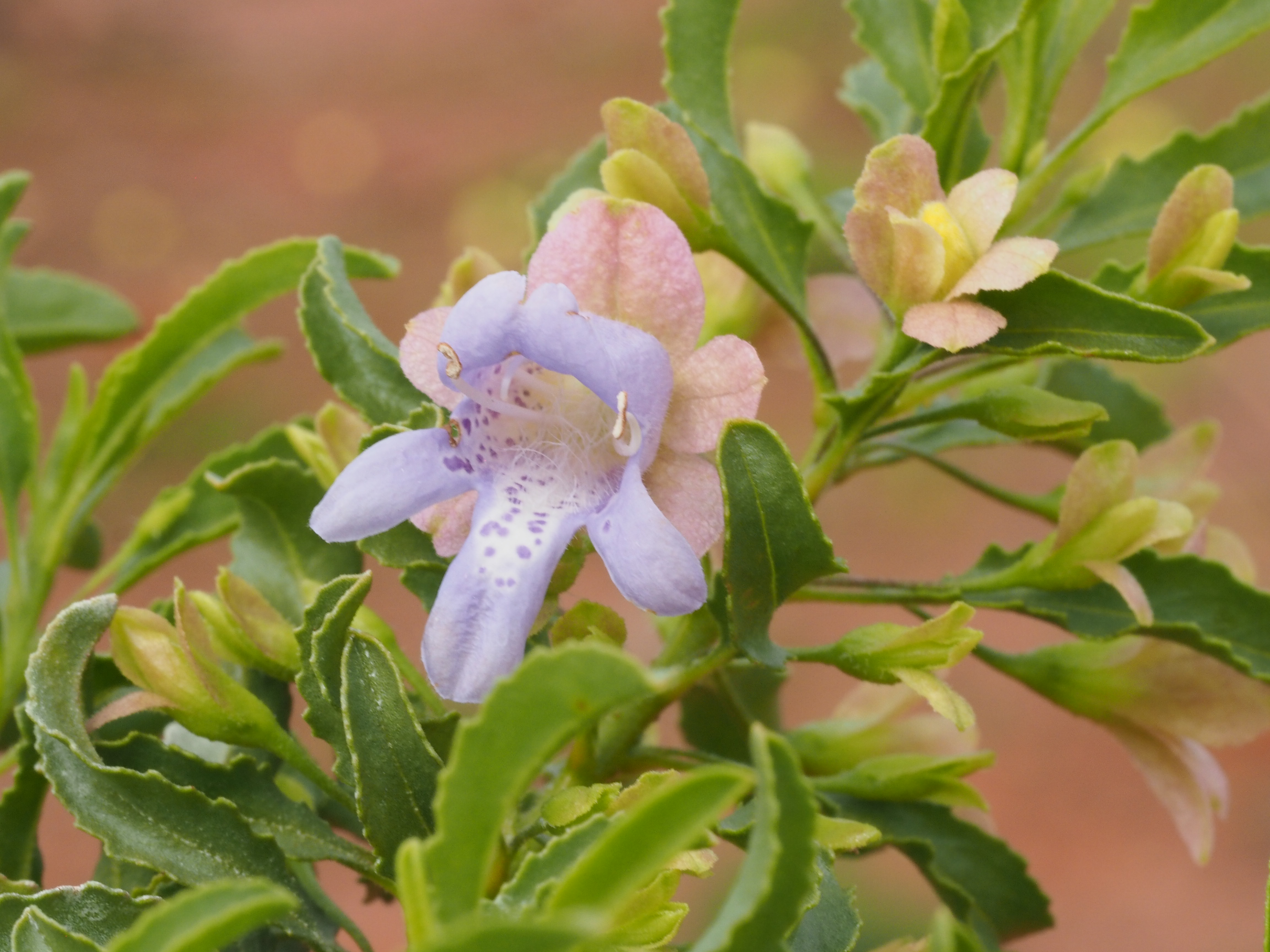
Eremophila crenulata flowers
