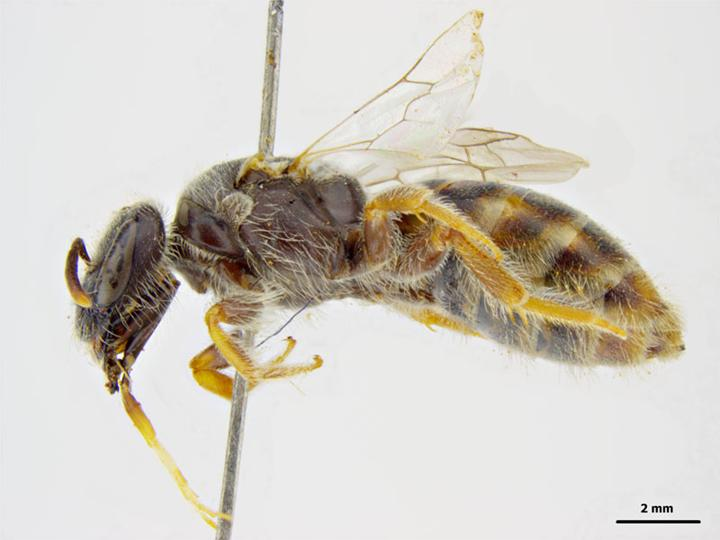
- Female

Scientific classification
- Kingdom: Animalia
- Phylum: Arthropoda
- Clade: Pancrustacea
- Class: Insecta
- Order: Hymenoptera
- Family: Colletidae
- Genus: Euhesma
- Species: E. macrayae

Binomial name
- Euhesma macrayae (Exley, 1998)

Synonyms
- Euryglossa (Euhesma) macrayae Exley, 1998

= Euhesma macrayae =

Species of bee

Euhesma macrayae, or Euhesma (Euhesma) macrayae, is a species of bee in the family Colletidae and the subfamily Euryglossinae. It is endemic to Australia. It was described in 1998 by Australian entomologist Elizabeth Exley.

== Etymology ==
The specific epithet macrayae honours Exley’s niece Elizabeth McCray for her assistance in typing the manuscript.

== Description ==
Body length of the female is 7.0 mm, wing length 5.0 mm; that of the male is body length 6.0 mm, wing length 4.8 mm. Colouration is mainly black, brown and yellowish.

== Distribution and habitat ==
The species occurs in inland Western Australia. The type locality is 136 km north-north-east of Meekatharra in the Mid West region.

== Behaviour ==
The adults are flying mellivores. Flowering plants visited by the bees include Eremophila platycalyx and Eremophila cuneifolia.

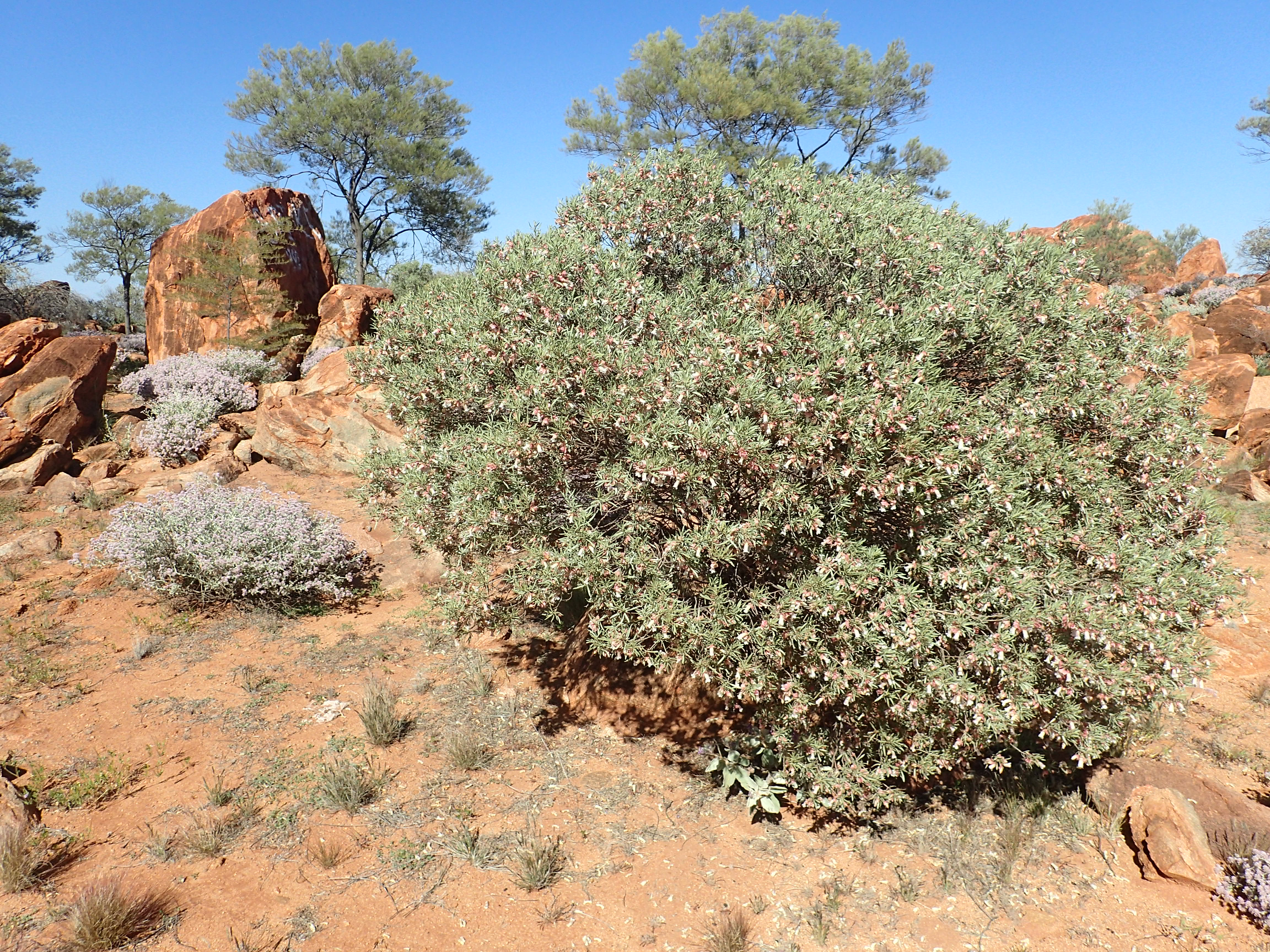
Eremophila platycalyx, a favoured forage plant of the bees
