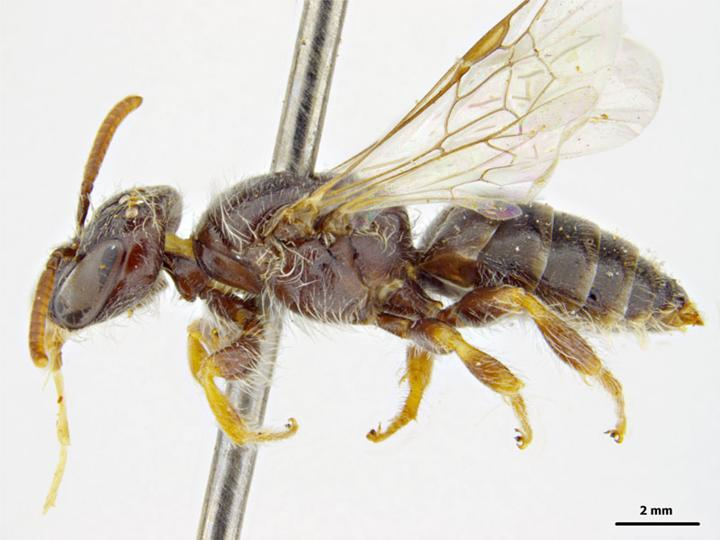
- Female

Scientific classification
- Kingdom: Animalia
- Phylum: Arthropoda
- Clade: Pancrustacea
- Class: Insecta
- Order: Hymenoptera
- Family: Colletidae
- Genus: Euhesma
- Species: E. granitica

Binomial name
- Euhesma granitica (Exley, 1998)

Synonyms
- Euryglossa (Euhesma) granitica Exley, 1998

= Euhesma granitica =

Species of bee

Euhesma granitica, or Euhesma (Euhesma) granitica, is a species of bee in the family Colletidae and the subfamily Euryglossinae. It is endemic to Australia. It was described in 1998 by Australian entomologist Elizabeth Exley.

== Etymology ==
The specific epithet granitica refers to the species of forage plant on which the types were collected.

== Description ==
Body length of the female is 6.0 mm, wing length 4.0 mm; that of the male is body length 5.5 mm, wing length 3.8 mm. Colouration is mainly black, dark brown and yellow.

== Distribution and habitat ==
The species occurs in Western Australia. The type locality is 22 km south of Mount Magnet in the Mid West region.

== Behaviour ==
The adults are flying mellivores. Flowering plants visited by the bees include Eremophila granitica.

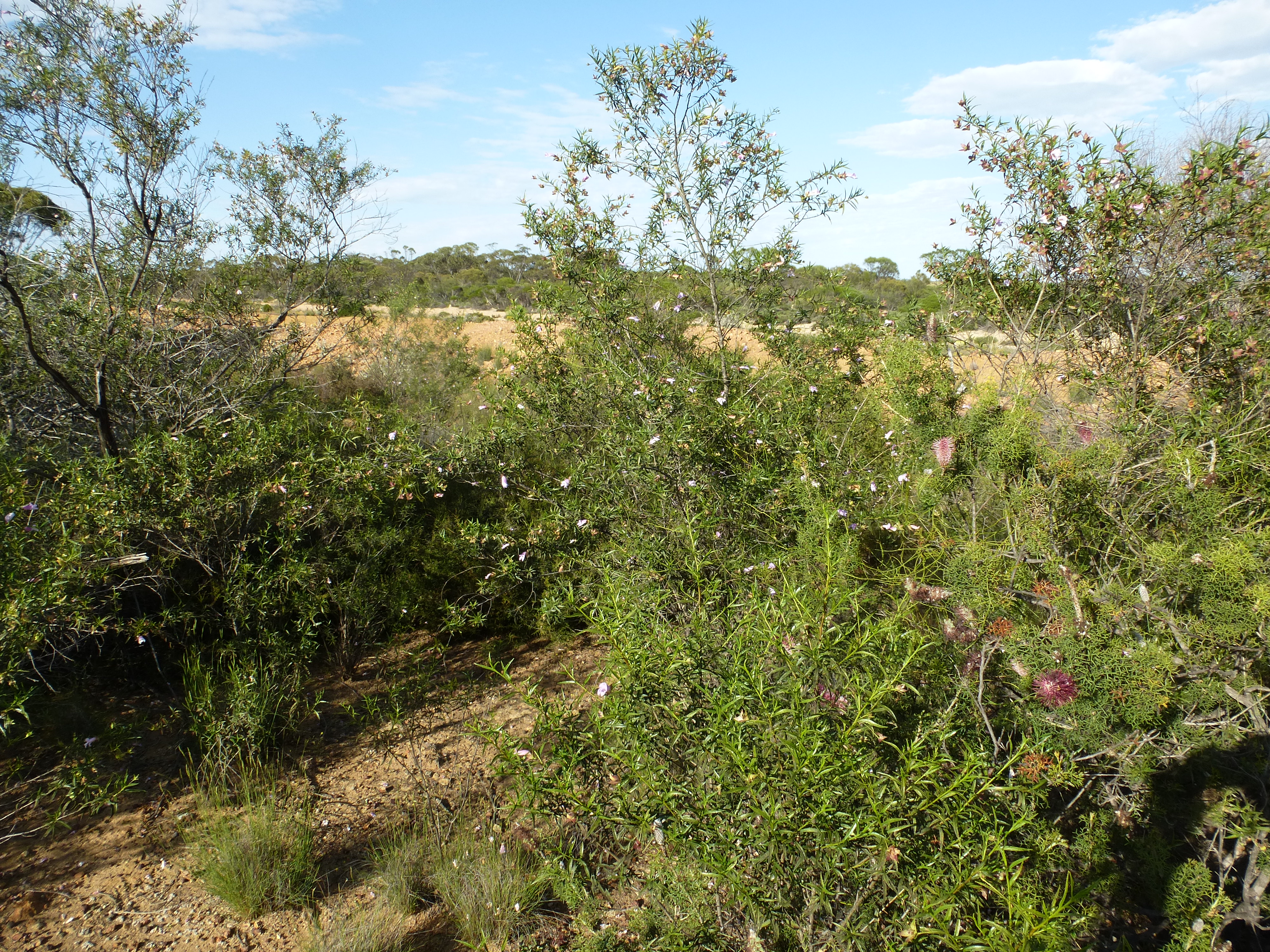
Eremophila granitica, or granite poverty bush, a favoured forage plant of the bees
