= Euhesma cuneifolia =

Scientific classification
- Kingdom: Animalia
- Phylum: Arthropoda
- Clade: Pancrustacea
- Class: Insecta
- Order: Hymenoptera
- Family: Colletidae
- Genus: Euhesma
- Species: E. cuneifolia

Binomial name
- Euhesma cuneifolia (Exley, 1998)

Synonyms
- Euryglossa (Euhesma) cuneifolia Exley, 1998

Species of bee

Euhesma cuneifolia, or Euhesma (Euhesma) cuneifolia, is a species of bee in the family Colletidae and the subfamily Euryglossinae. It is endemic to Australia. It was described in 1998 by Australian entomologist Elizabeth Exley.

== Etymology ==
The specific epithet cuneifolia refers to the forage plant on which the types were collected.

== Description ==
Body length of the female is 7.0 mm, wing length 5.0 mm. Colouration is mainly black, brown and yellowish.

== Distribution and habitat ==
The species occurs in north-west Western Australia. The type locality is the Lyons River homestead in the Gascoyne region. It has also been recorded from Newman in the Pilbara.

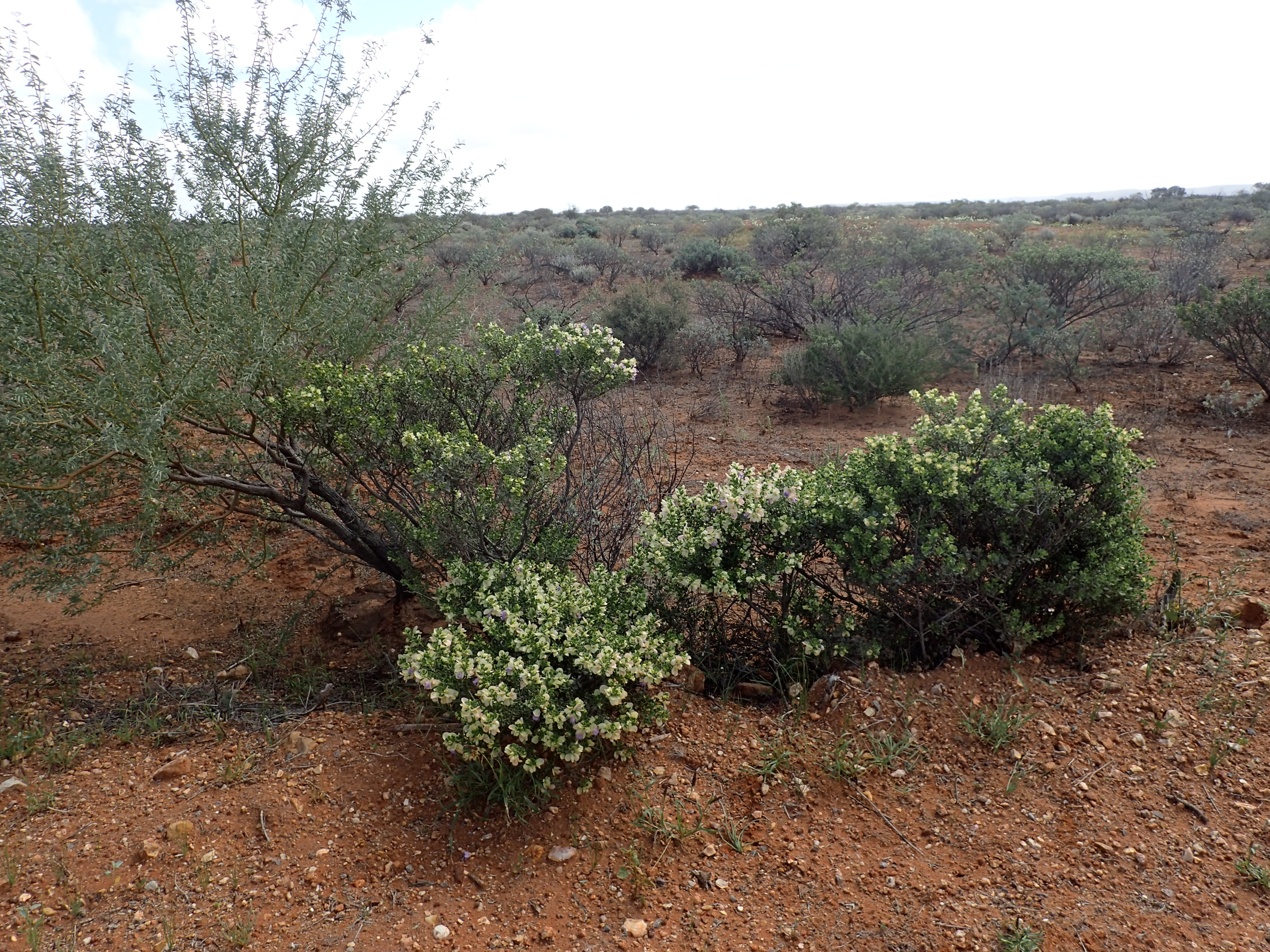
Eremophila cuneifolia, or pinyuru, a favoured forage plant of the bees, in the Kennedy Range National Park, Gascoyne region

== Behaviour ==
The adults are flying mellivores. Flowering plants visited by the bees include Eremophila cuneifolia.
