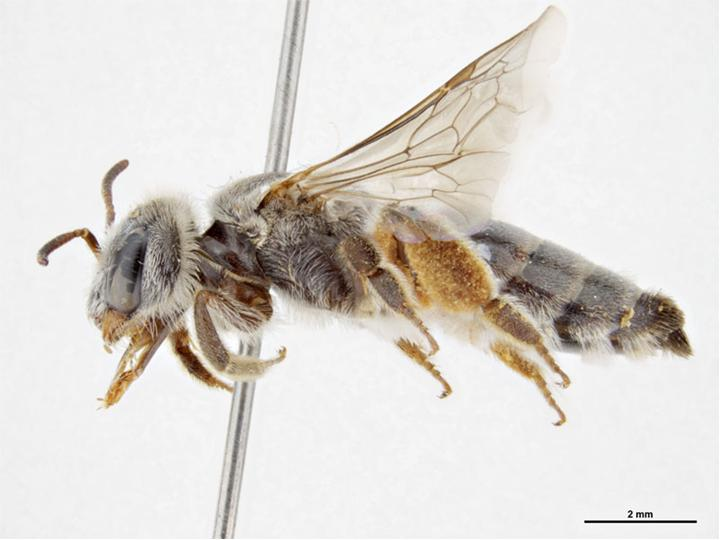
- Female

Scientific classification
- Kingdom: Animalia
- Phylum: Arthropoda
- Clade: Pancrustacea
- Class: Insecta
- Order: Hymenoptera
- Family: Colletidae
- Genus: Leioproctus
- Species: L. capito

Binomial name
- Leioproctus capito Houston, 1990

= Leioproctus capito =

Species of bee

Leioproctus capito, or Leioproctus (Leioproctus) capito, is a species of bee in the family Colletidae and subfamily Colletinae. It is endemic to Australia. It was described by Australian entomologist Terry Houston in 1990.

== Etymology ==
The specific epithet capito (Latin: "large-headed") is an anatomical reference.

== Description ==
The male holotype body length is about 11 mm, the female paratype about 10 mm. Integumental colouration is mainly black to dark brown; the hair is mainly white.

== Distribution and habitat ==
The species occurs in the arid Goldfields–Esperance region of Western Australia, between Mount Magnet and Laverton, and extending into the far north of South Australia. The type locality is Banjawarn Homestead.

== Behaviour ==
The adults are flying mellivores. Flowering plants visited by the bees include Eremophila spathulata and Dipteracanthus species.

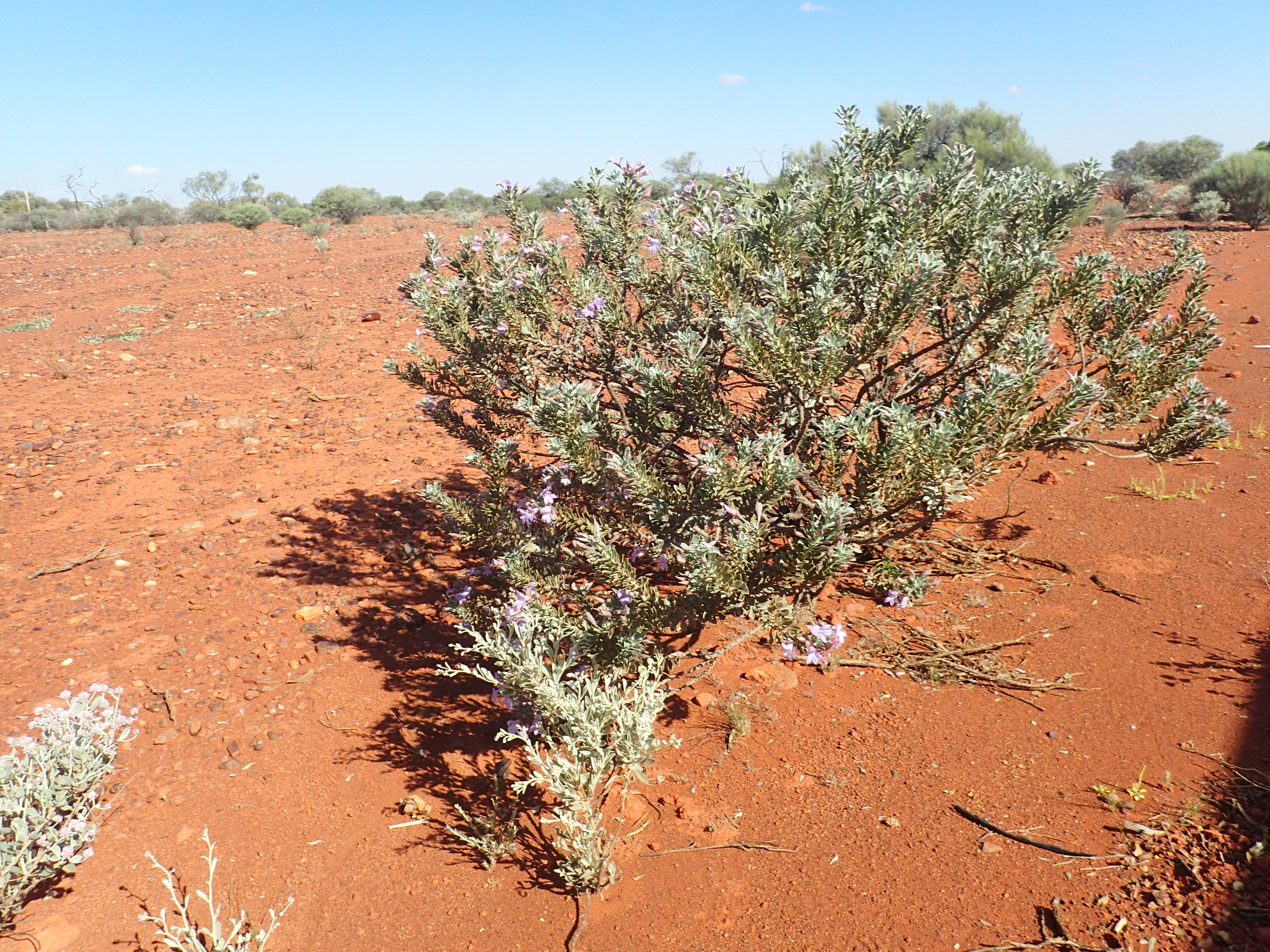
Eremophila spathulata (spoon-leaved eremophila), a forage plant of the bees

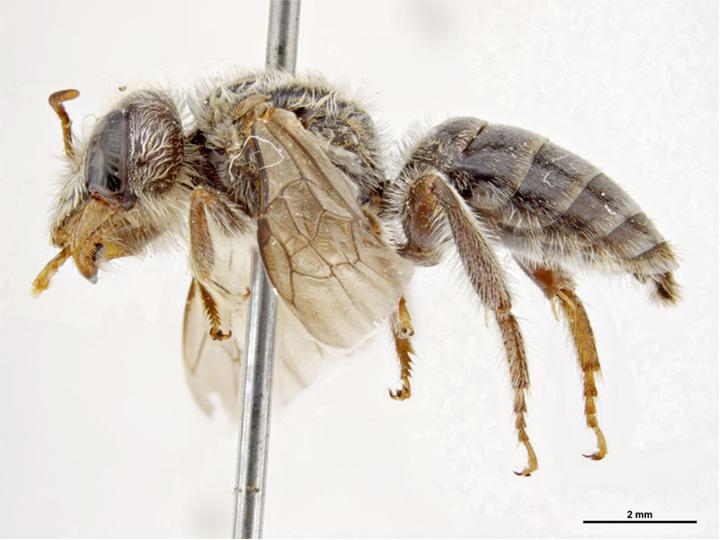
Male
