= Eremophila battii =

Scientific classification
- Kingdom: Plantae
- Clade: Tracheophytes
- Clade: Angiosperms
- Clade: Eudicots
- Clade: Asterids
- Order: Lamiales
- Family: Scrophulariaceae
- Genus: Eremophila
- Species: E. battii

Binomial name
- Eremophila battii F.Muell.

Synonyms
- Eremophila battii F.Muell. var. battii; Eremophila battii var. major J.M.Black; Pholidia battii (F.Muell.) Kraenzl.

Species of flowering plant

Eremophila battii, also known as Batt's poverty bush, is a flowering plant in the figwort family, Scrophulariaceae and is endemic to central Australia. It is a low, spreading shrub with short, very hairy leaves and pink, purple or blue flowers.

== Description ==
Eremophila battii is a spreading, intricately branched shrub with hairy stems, sometimes growing to a height and spread of about 0.75 m (2 ft). The leaves are arranged alternately, mostly 5–14 mm (0.2–0.6 in) long, 1.0–3.5 mm (0.04–0.1 in) wide, lance-shaped with the narrower end towards the base and a curved tip. The surface of the leaves is hairy and dished and there are usually a few prominent teeth near the tip.

The flowers are usually borne singly in leaf axils on a stalk usually 2–5.5 mm (0.08–0.2 in) long. There are 5 overlapping green, hairy sepals differing slightly in size and shape from each other but about 3–10 mm (0.1–0.4 in) long. The 5 petals are 16–23 mm (0.6–0.9 in) long and joined at their lower end to form a tube. The tube and the petal lobes on its end are a shade of pink or blue to purple but the inside of the tube is white with dark purple stripes and spots on the sides. The outside of the tube is hairy but the inside is densely hairy except for the petal lobes which are glabrous. The 4 stamens do not protrude beyond the petal tube. Flowers appear from July to October and are followed by fruit which are dry, almost spherical and about 6–10 mm (0.2–0.4 in) long and hairy.

== Taxonomy and naming ==
The species was first formally described by Ferdinand von Mueller in 1890 with the description published in Proceedings of the Linnean Society of New South Wales. The type specimen was collected near Eucla by J.D.Batt, variously named as John Dorington Batt, a teamster, John Downton Batt, a linesman and John David Batt. The specific epithet (battii) honours J.D.Batt.

== Distribution and habitat ==
This eremophila occurs as scattered populations in central Western Australia, southern Northern Territory and South Australia growing in red sandy soils.

== Ecology ==
The native bee Leioproctus lanceolatus has been observed pollinating E. battii.

== Conservation status ==
Batt's poverty bush is classified as "not threatened" by the Government of Western Australia Department of Parks and Wildlife.

== Use in horticulture ==
Eremophila battii is a small, attractive shrub with vibrant blue or purple flowers. It can be grown from seed or cuttings or by grafting onto Myoporum species. It grows best in well-drained soil in full sun or filtered shade, is drought resistant but susceptible to damage from frosts.
