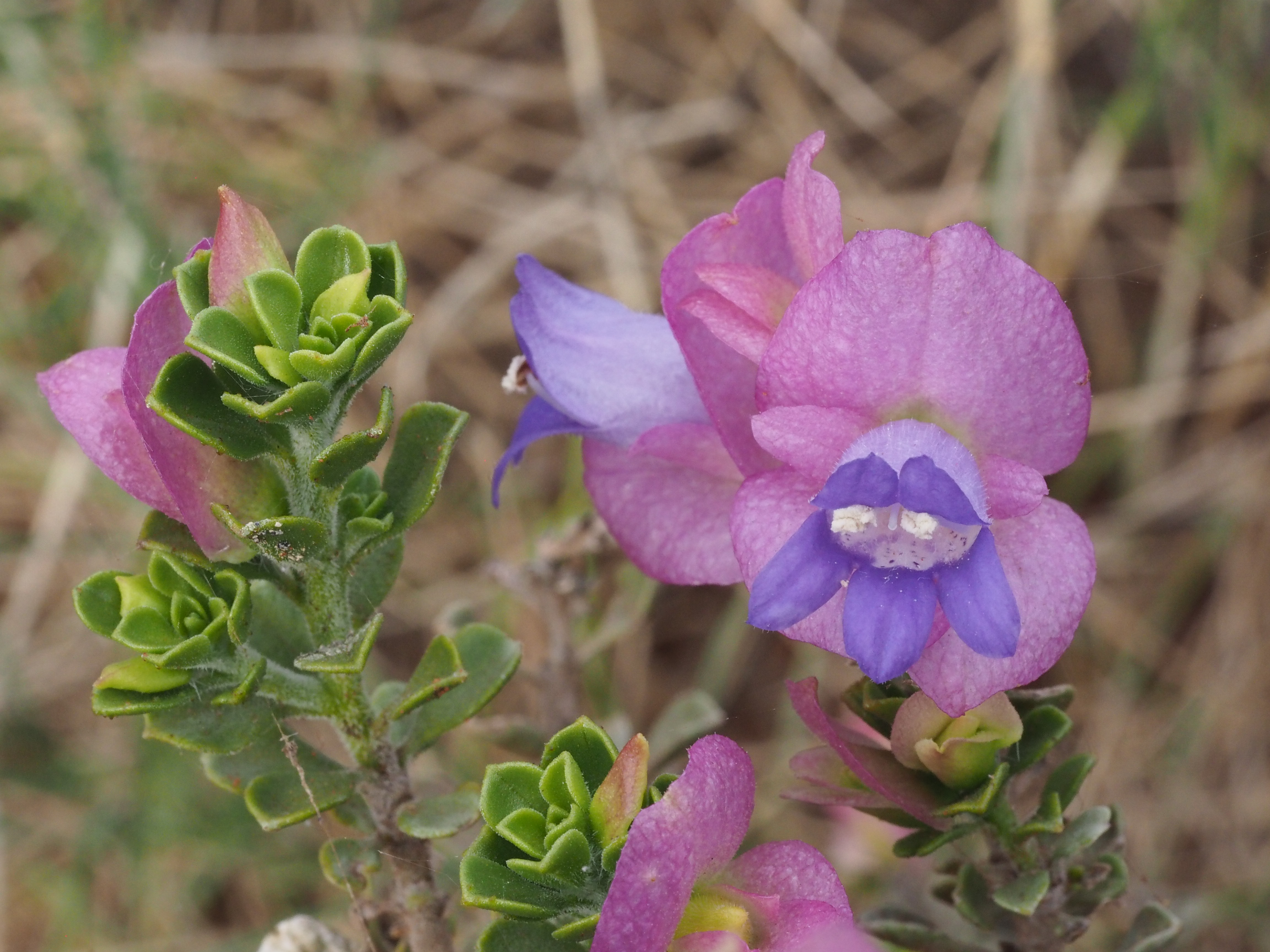
- Eremophila cuneifolia - form with colourful sepals

Scientific classification
- Kingdom: Plantae
- Clade: Tracheophytes
- Clade: Angiosperms
- Clade: Eudicots
- Clade: Asterids
- Order: Lamiales
- Family: Scrophulariaceae
- Genus: Eremophila
- Species: E. cuneifolia

Binomial name
- Eremophila cuneifolia Kraenzl.

= Eremophila cuneifolia =

Pinyuru

Species of flowering plant

Eremophila cuneifolia, commonly known as pinyuru, is a flowering plant in the figwort family, Scrophulariaceae and is endemic to the north-west of Western Australia. It is a spreading, sticky shrub with wedge-shaped leaves, coloured sepals and usually deep purple flowers.

== Description ==
Eremophila cuneifolia is a spreading shrub growing to a height of between 0.4 and 1.8 metres (1 and 6 ft) with hairy branches and with branches and leaves that are thickly covered with sticky, shiny resin. The leaves are arranged alternately and clustered near the ends of the stems, mostly 5–16 millimetres (0.2–0.6 in) long, about 3–14 millimetres (0.1–0.6 in) wide, wedge-shaped or heart-shaped but with a distinct small point at the tip. They are thick and stiff and the top surface of the leaves is glabrous while the lower surface is hairy.

The flowers are borne singly in leaf axils on hairy stalks 1–3.5 millimetres (0.04–0.1 in) long. There are five cream-coloured to pale reddish-purple, slightly overlapping, egg-shaped sepals differing in size from each other but mostly 8.5–26 millimetres (0.3–1 in) long. The petals are 16–26 millimetres (0.6–1 in) long and joined at their lower end to form a tube. The petal tube is usually deep purple on the outside, sometimes paler, and white inside with purple spots. There are scattered hairs on the outside of the tube and on the lobes but the tube is filled with long, soft hairs. The four stamens are fully enclosed within the tube. Flowering occurs mostly from June to October and is followed by fruits which are oval to cone-shaped, shiny and 5.5–9 millimetres (0.2–0.4 in) long.

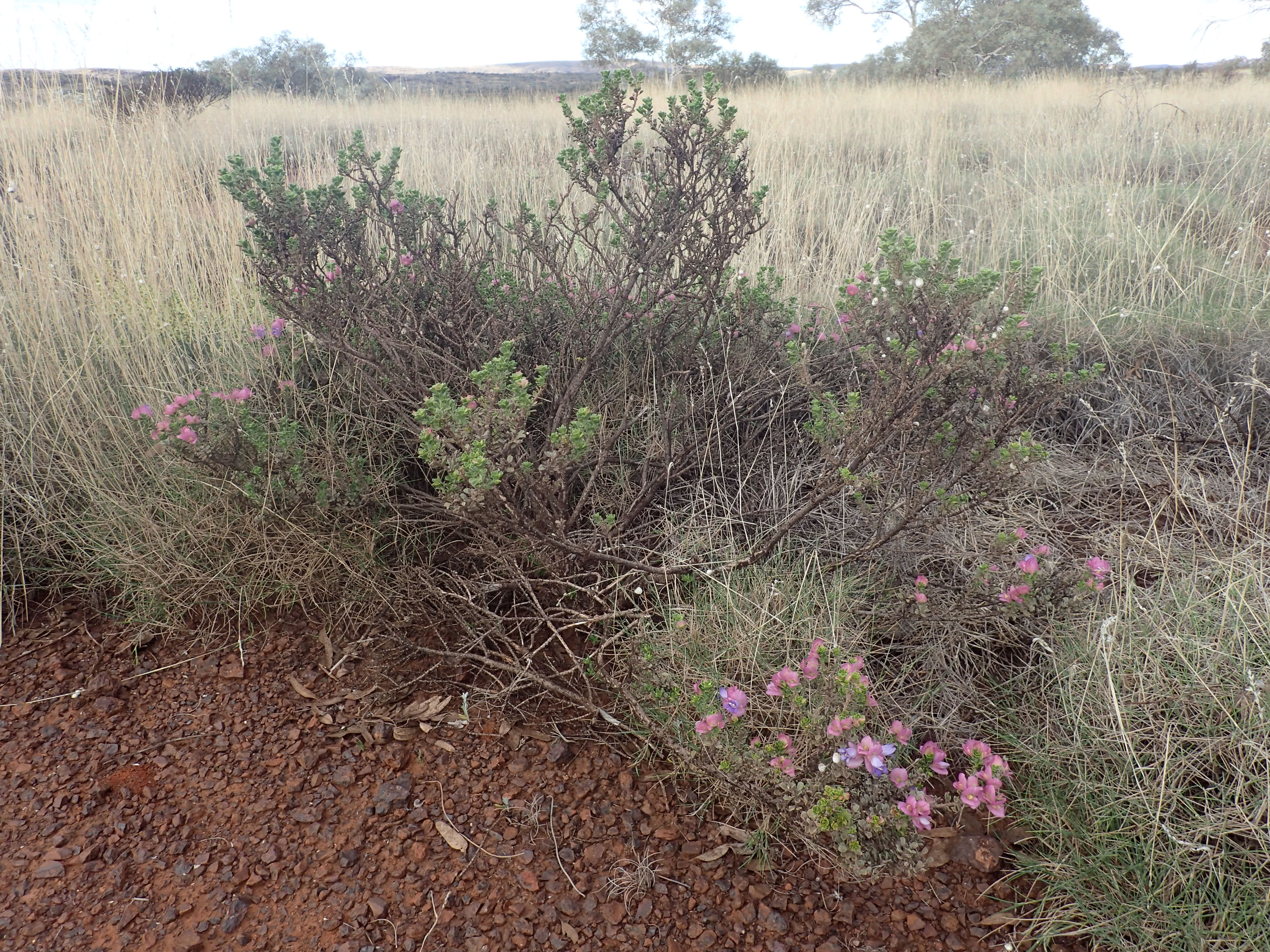
Habit near Ophthalmia Dam, Newman

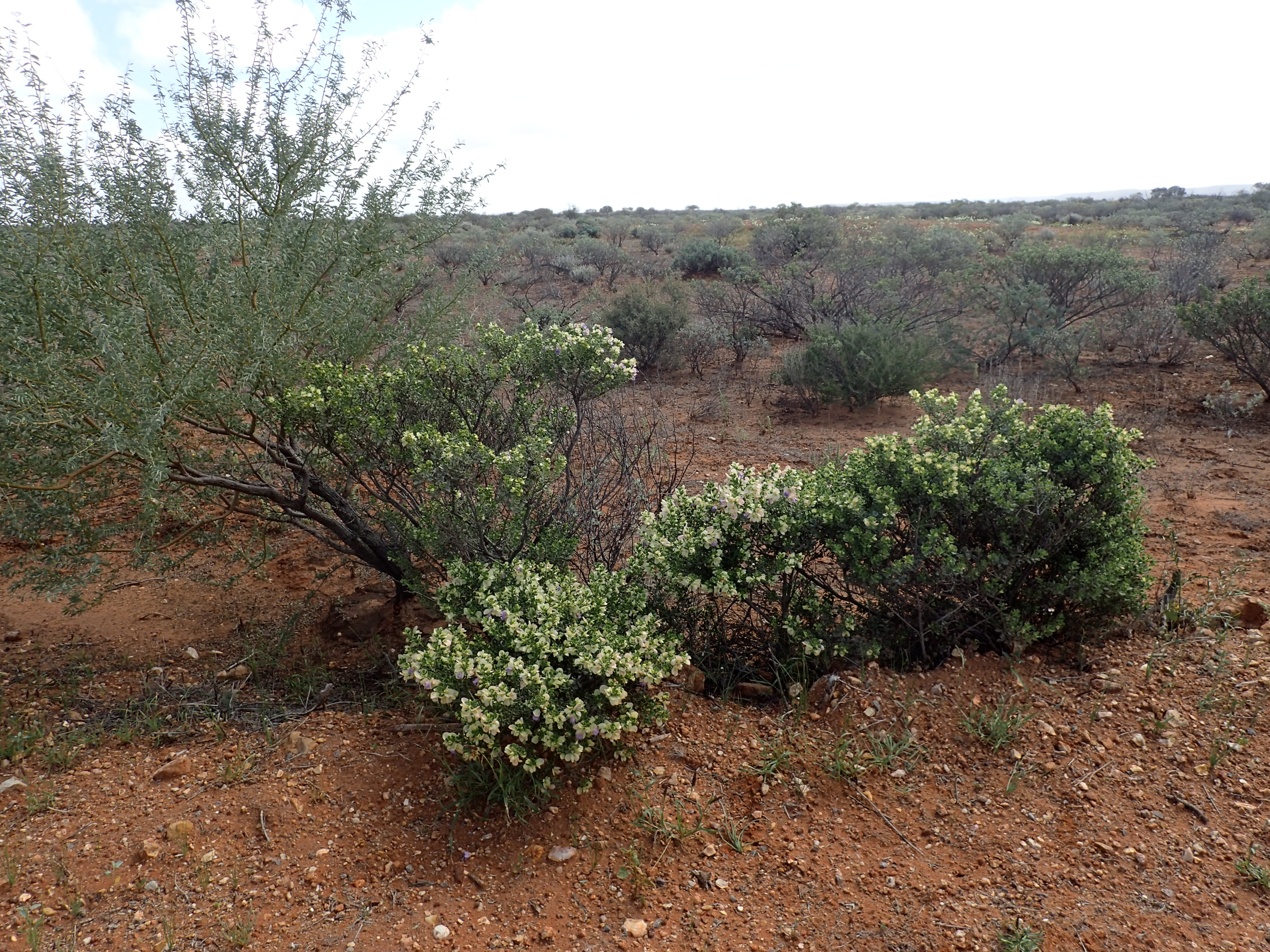
Habit near the Kennedy Range

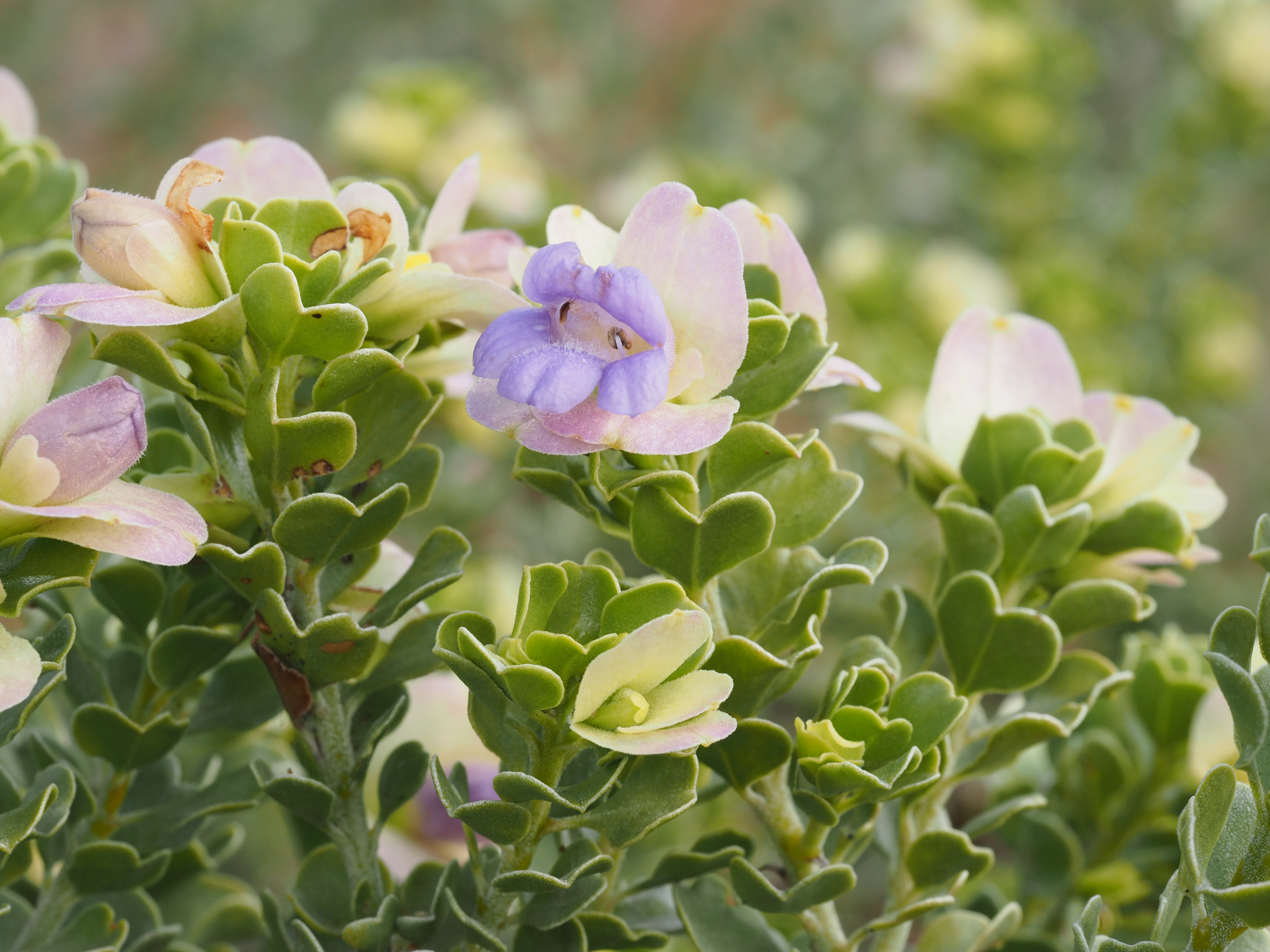
Form with pale-coloured sepals

== Taxonomy and naming ==
The species was first formally described by Friedrich Wilhelm Ludwig Kraenzlin in 1929 and the description was published in Repertorium Specierum Novarum Regni Vegetabilis Beihefte. The type specimen was collected by the explorer Charles Crossland, near Mount Hale on the upper reaches of the Murchison River, about 140 kilometres (90 mi) west north west of Meekatharra. The specific epithet (cuneifolia) is from the Latin words cuneus meaning "wedge" and folium meaning "a leaf".

== Distribution ==
Pinyuru occurs between Leonora, Jigalong and Onslow in the Carnarvon, Little Sandy Desert, Central Ranges, Murchison, Pilbara and Gascoyne biogeographic regions. It grows in a range of soils and habitats, often in association with other Eremophila species and is sometimes the dominant plant species.

== Conservation status ==
Eremophila cuneifolia is classified as "not threatened" by the Government of Western Australia Department of Parks and Wildlife.

== Use in horticulture ==
This is one of the most attractive eremophilas in cultivation with its colourful sepals and deep purple flowers. It is not easy to propagate or to maintain, especially in areas like Sydney where the humidity is high. It is usually propagated by grafting onto Myoporum and needs a well-drained soil. Pinyuru is also frost sensitive and for this reason is probably best grown in a container which can be moved as the seasons change.
