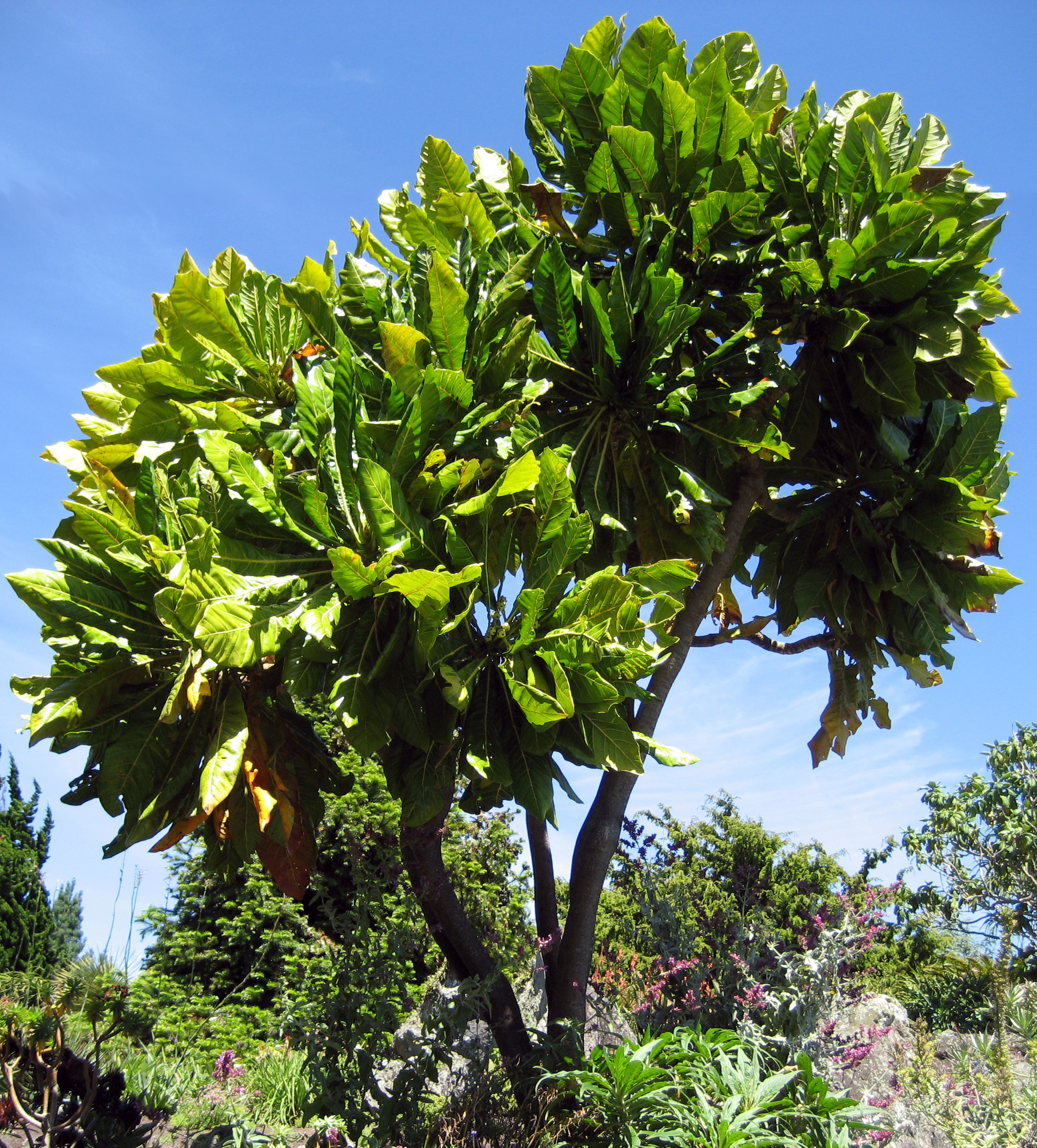

Scientific classification
- Kingdom: Plantae
- Clade: Tracheophytes
- Clade: Angiosperms
- Clade: Eudicots
- Clade: Asterids
- Order: Apiales
- Family: Araliaceae
- Genus: Meryta
- Species: M. denhamii

Binomial name
- Meryta denhamii Seem.

= Meryta denhamii =

Species of tree

Meryta denhamii is an evergreen tree endemic to the Pacific island of New Caledonia, where it occurs in dense humid forest.

== Description ==
Meryta denhamii grows to about 6 metres (20 ft) tall. The large, stiff, leathery leaves are elongated, curved at the edges and appear in tufts or bunches at the ends of the branches. Their central rib is thick and fleshy with longitudinal grooves. On younger trees the leaves are up to 45 centimetres (18 in) long and about 12 cm (4.7 in) wide. On older trees the leaves may be up to 1 m (3.3 ft) long and 24 cm (9.4 in) wide. The flowers exude a sweet scent. The plants are either female or male. Since the anthers protrude from the flowers, it is likely that the pollen is spread mainly by wind. Female flowers also occasionally produce anthers, but these are stunted and unproductive.

== Discovery ==
Meryta denhamii owes its discovery to the Scot William Grant Milne (?–1866), a gardener at the Edinburgh Botanic Garden, who joined the HMS Herald expedition to the south-western Pacific (1852–1856) as a botanist. Milne found the tree growing on the Isle of Pines in the south of New Caledonia. Specimens were sent to the Royal Botanical Gardens in Kew, London, where the plant flowered in the greenhouse in 1860. Two years later botanist Berthold Seeman named the plant Meryta denhamii in honour of Henry Mangles Denham, captain of Herald, for whom also the town of Denham, Western Australia was named.

== Cultivation ==
Rare in cultivation, Meryta denhamii may be grown fairly easily in warm frost-free climates like those of Sydney, Australia, or Florida in the United States. A slightly hardier alternative is the New Zealand Puka tree, Meryta sinclairii, which has wider leaves and can withstand frosts down to −2 °C (28 °F) once established.
