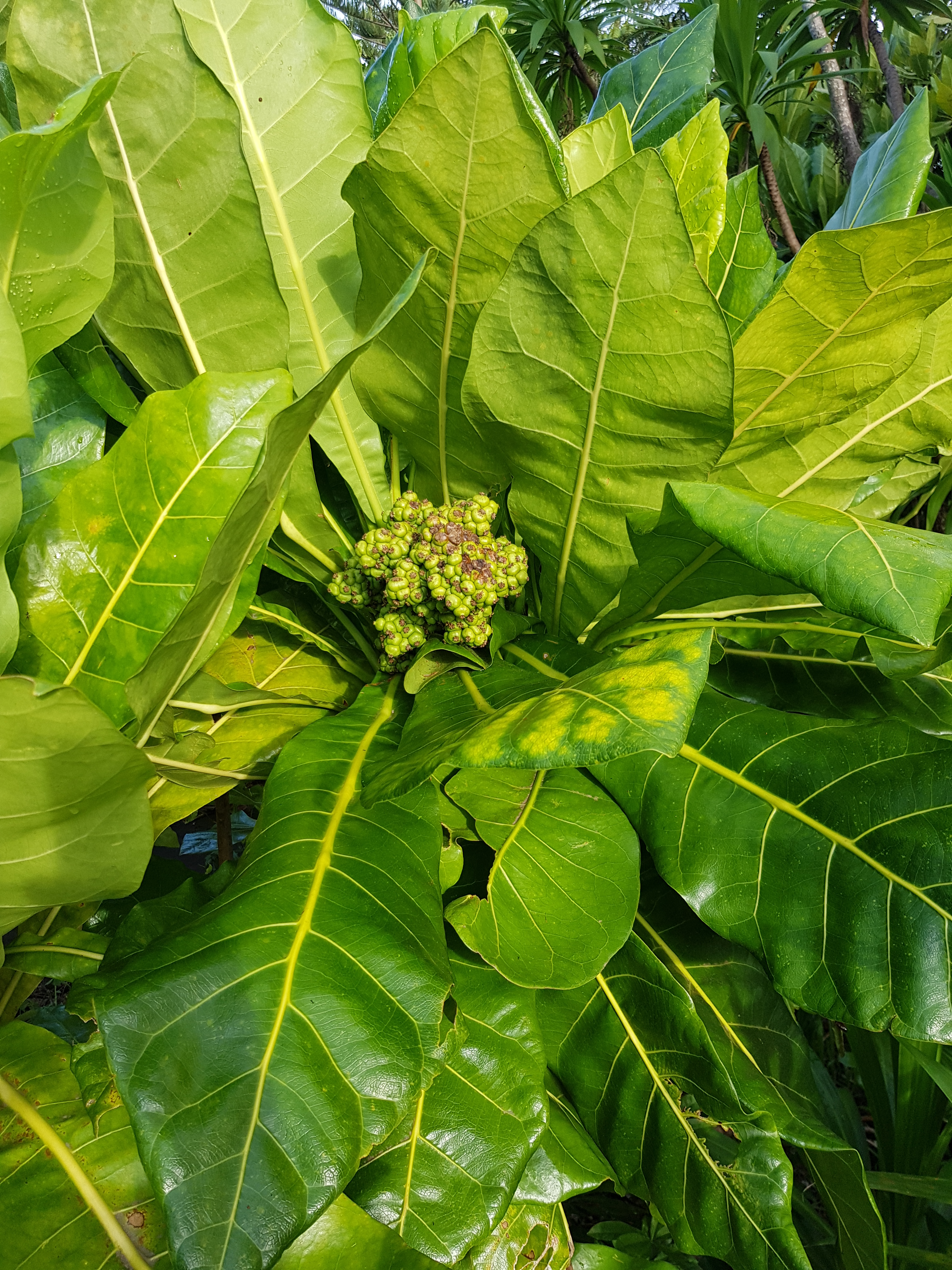

Conservation status
- Critically endangered (EPBC Act)

Scientific classification
- Kingdom: Plantae
- Clade: Tracheophytes
- Clade: Angiosperms
- Clade: Eudicots
- Clade: Asterids
- Order: Apiales
- Family: Araliaceae
- Genus: Meryta
- Species: M. latifolia

Binomial name
- Meryta latifolia (Endl.) Seem.

Synonyms
- Botryodendrum latifolium Endl.

= Meryta latifolia =

Species of tree

Meryta latifolia, commonly known as broad-leaved meryta or shade tree, is an evergreen tree endemic to Norfolk Island, Australia, where it occurs in subtropical moist forest conditions.

== Description ==
Meryta latifolia grows as a single-trunked tree reaching 5 to 6 m (16.5 to 19.5 ft) tall. It may have a few branches near the top. Its wood is brittle. The wide leaves grow to 50–75 cm (19.5–29.5 in) in length by 25–30 cm (10–12 in) across. They are oblanceolate in shape, having a narrowed base and broad, rounded apex. The female inflorescence grows in a panicle at the end of the branch and is 10–15 cm (4–6 in) long, and densely clustered. The fruit is round, 5 to 6 mm long, bluntly 5 or 6-ribbed.

Convicts apparently used the large leaves to wrap up dough to bake in ashes.

== Taxonomy ==
Stephan Endlicher described the species as Botryodendrum latifolium in 1792.

German botanist Berthold Carl Seemann gave the species its current name in 1862.

== Distribution and status ==
Meryta latifolia occurs only on Norfolk Island, and is considered critically endangered because it is dioecious, having separate male and female plants. The total number of mature individual plants is less than 150, the effective reproductive population limited by the number of surviving female plants, which number approximately 20. It occurs on ten sites on Norfolk Island, but most of these contain only one or two plants and only one site has more than 13. Although one site contains approximately 115 trees, regeneration is not occurring at this site. Continuing declines in the number of mature individuals, and number of locations and subpopulations are projected for several reasons including: lack of formal protection or management programs, the vulnerability of small populations to stochastic disturbance events (e.g. cyclones), ongoing competition with invasive weeds, predation by rats, senescence of over-mature plants, and sex ratio bias. The species is adapted to moist forest conditions and is therefore susceptible to unfavourable climate change (projected increases in the incidence of drought and extreme rainfall events that cause physical damage).

== Ecology ==
The introduced song thrush nests in its foliage.

== Cultivation ==
Rare in cultivation, M. latifolia may be grown fairly easily in warm frost-free climates like those of Sydney, Australia, or Florida in the United States. A slightly hardier alternative is the New Zealand Puka tree, M. sinclairii, with huge broad leaves, which can withstand frosts down to -2C once established.
