= William Grant Milne =

Scottish botanist

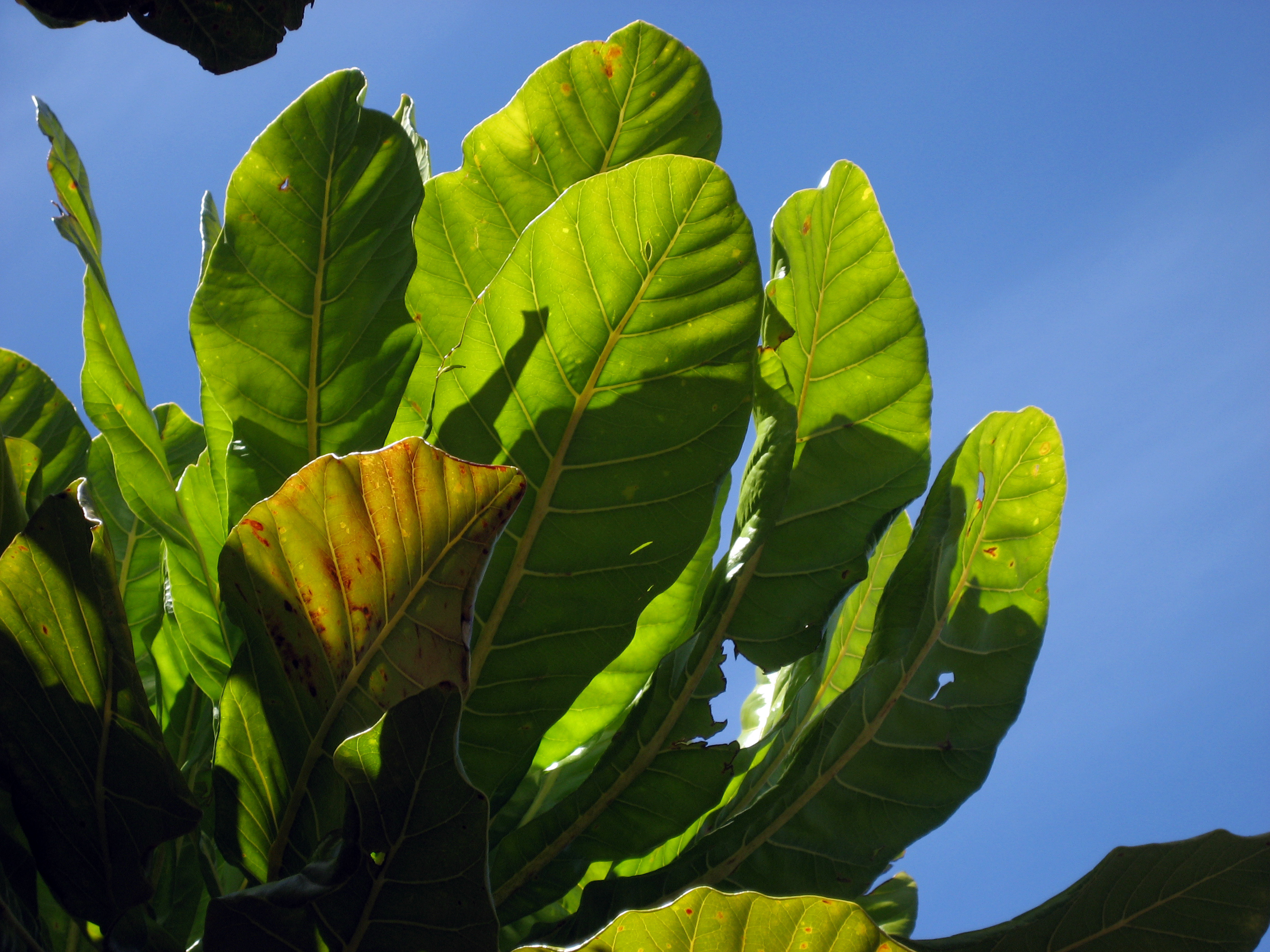
Foliage of Meryta denhamii, discovered by Milne in New Caledonia

William Grant Milne (11 May 1829, Banff, Aberdeenshire – 1866), was a Scottish botanist.

A gardener at the Edinburgh Botanic Garden, Milne joined the Herald expedition to the southwestern Pacific (1852–1856) as a botanist. The expedition visited, inter alia, Lord Howe Island, New South Wales and Western Australia. Milne was initially accompanied by fellow Scots botanist John MacGillivray, who left the ship in 1855 after a dispute with Captain Henry Mangles Denham.

Milne, the discoverer of several plants, including the rare New Caledonian tree Meryta denhamii which he found growing on the Isle of Pines in 1853 and sent to the Royal Botanical Gardens in Kew, had botanist Berthold Carl Seemann name the plant Meryta denhamii after Captain Denham (for whom the town of Denham, Western Australia was also named). The plant was described from specimens that had flowered in a greenhouse in Kew in 1860.

W. G. Milne collected in South Africa (1852–1853) and in a later expedition in West Africa (1862–1866), where he was forced to sell his clothes when his funds ran out and walked naked for some two hundred miles. He died in Creek Town, Old Calabar (Nigeria).

The Times of London mentions in its 14 March 1866 edition that "Professor Milne, the celebrated botanist, has commenced the ascension of the Cameroons mountains".

== Eponyms ==
- Asplenium milnei Carruth. (specimen from Lord Howe Island)
- Stenocarpus milnei Hook. (specimen from New Caledonia)
- Freycinetia milnei Seem. (specimen from Fiji)

== See also ==
- Henry Mangles Denham
- John MacGillivray
- List of gardener-botanist explorers of the Enlightenment
- European and American voyages of scientific exploration
