= M. salicifolia =

M. salicifolia may refer to:

- Magnolia salicifolia, the willow-leafed magnolia or anise magnolia, a tree species native to Japan
- Manihot salicifolia, a plant species in the genus Manihot
- Meryta salicifolia, a plant species endemic to French Polynesia
- Miconia salicifolia, a plant species in the genus Miconia
- Mida salicifolia, the willow-leaved maire or maire taike, a plant species in the genus Mida and the family Santalaceae
- Mollinedia salicifolia, a plant species in the genus Mollinedia
- Monnina salicifolia, a plant species in the genus Monnina
- Morella salicifolia, a plant species in the genus Morella
- Myrcia salicifolia, a synonym for Myrcia sphaerocarpa

== See also ==
- Salicifolia (disambiguation)
