= List of heritage places in the Shire of Shark Bay =

List of heritage sites in Western Australia

The State Register of Heritage Places is maintained by the Heritage Council of Western Australia. As of 2026, 53 places are heritage-listed in the Shire of Shark Bay, of which three are on the State Register of Heritage Places, all on Dirk Hartog Island.

== List ==
=== State Register of Heritage Places ===
The Western Australian State Register of Heritage Places, as of 2026, lists the following state registered places within the Shire of Shark Bay:

Place name	Place #	Location	Suburb or town	Co-ordinates	Built	State registered	Notes	Photo
Cape Inscription Lighthouse & Quarters	3261	Cape Inscription	Dirk Hartog Island	25.481919°S 112.971985°E	1910	30 August 2001	Consists of a concrete lighthouse tower, quarters and outbuildings; Includes the following State Heritage listed-child places: Cape Inscription Landing Site (23848); Cape Inscription Lighthouse & Buildings (24591)	
Cape Inscription Landing Site	23848	Cape Inscription	Dirk Hartog Island	25.482433°S 112.973007°E	1616			
Cape Inscription Lighthouse & Buildings	24591	Cape Inscription	Dirk Hartog Island	25.482494°S 112.972097°E	1910			

=== Shire of Shark Bay heritage-listed places ===
The following places are heritage listed in the Shire of Shark Bay but are not State registered:

Place name	Place #	Street #	Street name	Suburb or town	Notes & former names	Photo
Denham Post Office (former)	2367	10	Denham Road	Denham	Shark Bay Secondary Education Group Building, Police Station, Lock-up & Stables	
Denham Townsite Buildings	2369			Denham Townsite		
Pioneer Museum	2370		Nanga Streetation	Shark Bay	former Shark Bay Road Boards Office	
Peron Homestead	3606		Francois Peron National Park	Shark Bay		
Wolgedda Pioneer Cottage	4053		Nanga Station	Shark Bay		
Dirk Hartog Island	7402			Dirk Hartog Island		
Shark Bay Primary School	11704	39	Hughes Street	Denham		
St Andrew's Anglican Church	11705	35	Hughes Street	Denham		
Old Hospital	11706	29	Hughes Street	Denham	Hospital	
Shark Bay Shire Office	11707	42	Hughes Street	Denham Townsite		
Pioneer Park & Denham War memorial	11708	86	Hughes Street	Denham		
Poland House	11709	125	Knight Terrace	Denham		
Standring House	11711	53	Knight Terrace	Denham		
Pearl Buyer's Cottage	11712	39	Knight Terrace	Denham		
Bassett House	11713	31	Knight Terrace	Denham		
Ronberg House	11714	29	Knight Terrace	Denham		
Ma Fletcher's Cottage	11715	25	Knight Terrace	Denham		
Jetty at Denham Townsite	11716		Between Brockman & Durlacher Streets, off Knight Terrace	Denham Townsite	Shark's Bay Jetty, Original Jetty	
Winship House	11717	4	Mainland Street	Denham Townsite		
Shark Bay Road Board Office (former)	11718	9	Francis Road	Denham		
Denham Cemetery	11719		Denham-Hamelin Road	Denham Townsite		
Hamelin Pool Post Office, Post Master's Qtrs & Telegraph Station (former)	11720	Lot 50	Hamelin Pool Road	Shark Bay	Flint Cliff Telegraph Station	
Grave of Onslow Thomas Carmody	11722	Lot 346	Hamelin Pool Road	Shark Bay		
Flagpole	11723	Lot 346	Hamelin Pool Road	Shark Bay		
Shell Quarry	11724	Lot 55	Hamelin Pool Road	Shark Bay		
Point Petit Bore	11725		Point Petit	Shark Bay		
L'Haridon Bight Shell Spits	11726		L'Haridon Bight	Shark Bay		
Hamelin Station Homestead & Outbuildings	11727	220	Shark Bay Road	Hamelin Pool		
Carrarang Homestead	11728	Lot 3090	Useless Loop Road	Carrarang		
Carrarang Lifeboat (ruins)	11729		Carrarang Peninsula	Shark Bay		
Tamala Homestead, Outbuildings and Cottage Ruins	11730	Off	Useless Loop Road	Shark Bay		
40 Mile Water Shed	11731	Off	Denham-Overlander Road	Shark Bay		
Canning Factory Site	11732		Herald Bight	Shark Bay		
Monkey Mia Grave Site	11733		Monkey Mia	Shark Bay		
Denham-Hamelin Pool Telegraph Line	11734	Off	Denham-Overlander Road	Shark Bay		
Nanga No.1 Bore	11735		Nanga Streetation	Shark Bay		
Shipwrecks	11736		various locations	Shark Bay		
Pearl Camps - site	11927			Shark Bay		
Dirk Hartog Island Station	11928		Dirk Hartog Island, Shark Bay	Denham		
Peron No. 1 Bore	11929		Peron Streetation	Shark Bay		
Shark Bay Area	12412		Shark Bay	Denham	Includes Bernier Island, Dorre Island, Shark Bay Area, includes Dirk Hartog Island, the Peron Peninsula and Freycinet Estuary	
Shark Bay Honour Roll, foyer Heritage Resort	14094		Knights Terrace	Denham		
Denham/Shark Bay Fire Station	14495		Dampier Road	Denham		
Uranie Land Camp	15268		Peron Peninsula	Shark Bay		
Shark Bay Police Station	17384		Main Road	Shark Bay	Shark Bay Police Station (Denham)	
Police Lock-up, Shark Bay	17472	6	Denham Hamelin Road	Denham	Shark Bay Secondary Education Group	
Gudrun Shipwreck	18646			Shark Bay		
Sandy Point Compound, Dirk Hartog Island	19831		Sandy Point	Dirk Hartog Island	Sandy Wells	
Former Post Master's Quarters	23885		Hamelin Pool	Shark Bay		
Former Hamelin Pool Post & Telegraph Station	24478		Hamelin Pool Shark Bay	Shark Bay	Flint Cliff Telegraph Station	
