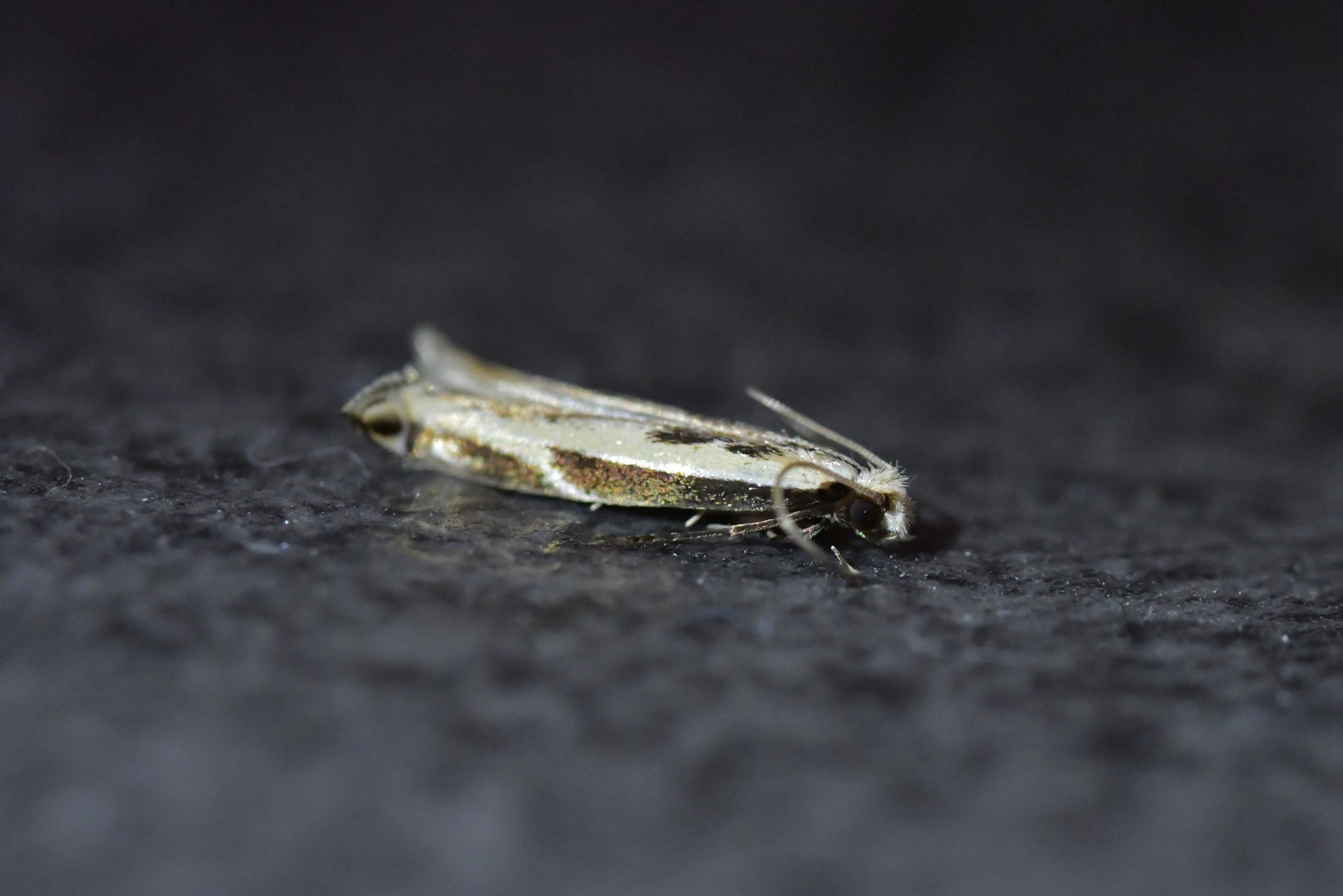

Scientific classification
- Kingdom: Animalia
- Phylum: Arthropoda
- Clade: Pancrustacea
- Class: Insecta
- Order: Lepidoptera
- Family: Tineidae
- Genus: Erechthias
- Species: E. terminella

Binomial name
- Erechthias terminella (Walker, 1863)

Synonyms
- Cerostoma terminella (Walker, 1863); Elachista subpavonella Walker, 1864

= Erechthias terminella =

Species of moth endemic to New Zealand

Erechthias terminella is a species of moth in the family Tineidae. It was first described by Francis Walker in 1863. This species is endemic to New Zealand and can be found throughout the North and in the upper parts of the South Islands. It inhabits native forest. The larvae of E. terminella feed under a web of silk and frass on the seeds as well as possibly the pods of Phormium tenax and are also known to feed on the fruits of plant species such as Meryta sinclairii. Larvae are generally sluggish but can be very agile when disturbed. Adults are on the wing throughout the year and are attracted to light.

== Taxonomy ==
This species was first described by Francis Walker in 1863 using a specimen collected in Auckland by Daniel Bolton and originally named Cerostoma terminella. In 1864 Walker, thinking he was describing a new species, named this moth Elachista subpavonella. In 1915 Meyrick placed this species in the genus Erechthias and synonymsied Elachista subpavonela. George Hudson discussed and illustrated this species in his 1928 book The butterflies and moths of New Zealand under that name. Hudson went on to describe the larva of this species in his 1950 book Fragments of New Zealand entomology.

== Description ==
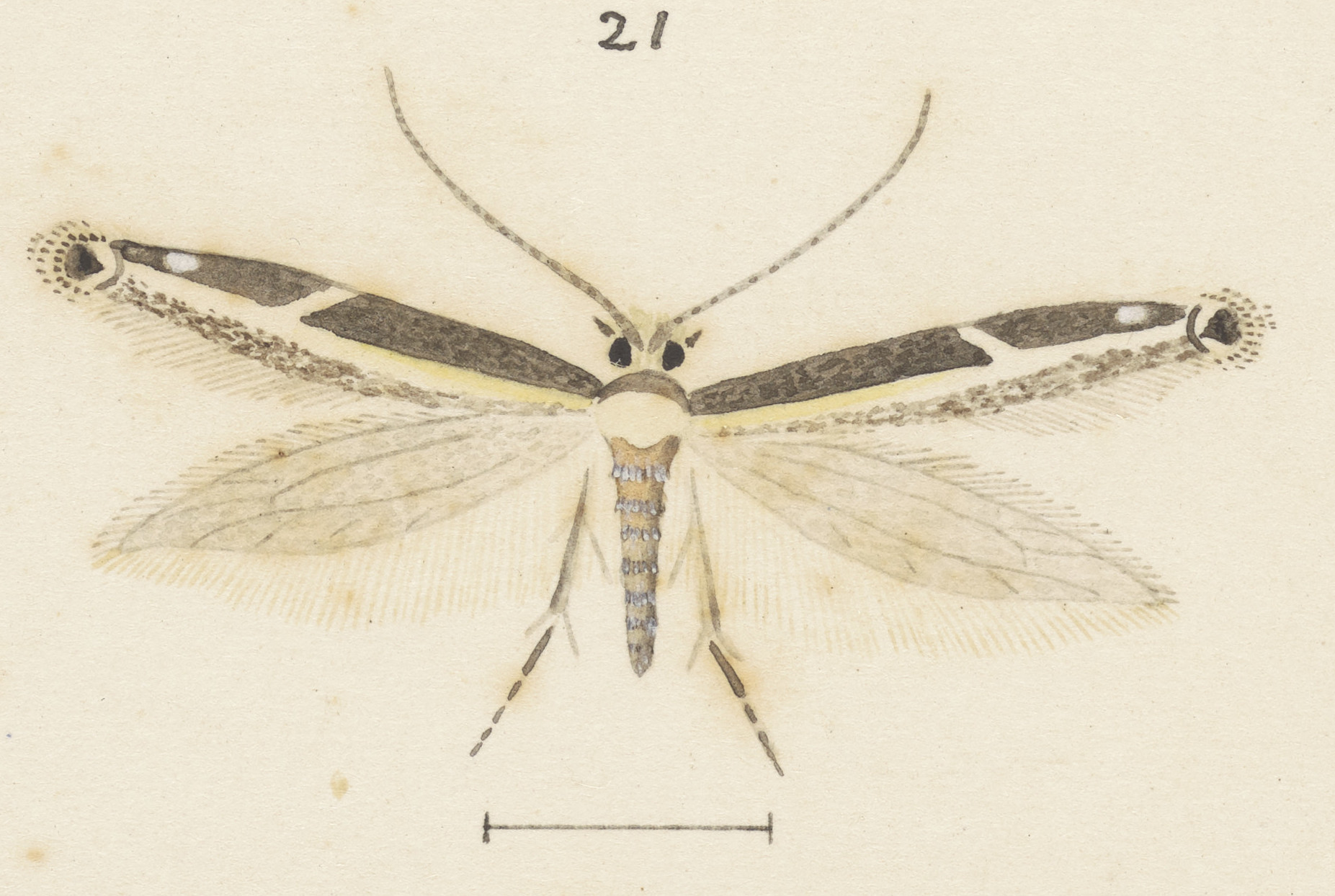
Illustration by Hudson.

Hudson described the larva of this species as follows:

The length of the full-grown larva is about 1/2 inch. Elongate, slender, of almost uniform thickness, the last three segments tapering. Head red-brown, highly polished. Segment 2 with blackish horny dorsal plate. Rest of body plate straw colour, darker beneath, with intestinal canal showing black; skin transversely wrinkled; a distinct lateral ridge.

This larva is similar in general appearance to that of Erechthias hemiclistra but is smaller and has a darker coloured median line.

Hudson described the adults of this species as follows:

The expansion of the wings is about 1/2 inch. The head and thorax are white, the anterior margin of latter sharply dark brown. The fore-wings are blackish-brown; there is a straight central longitudinal creamy-white streak from base to termen below apex, becoming rather broader towards apex, its lower margin rather irregular; two oblique white streaks from costa, the first near middle joining the central streak; the second midway between the first and apex, shorter and less distinct; the cilia are white containing a blackish ovate apical spot. The hind-wings are pale grey.

== Distribution ==
This species is endemic to New Zealand. This species is found throughout the North Island and in the upper parts of the South Island.

== Habitat and hosts ==
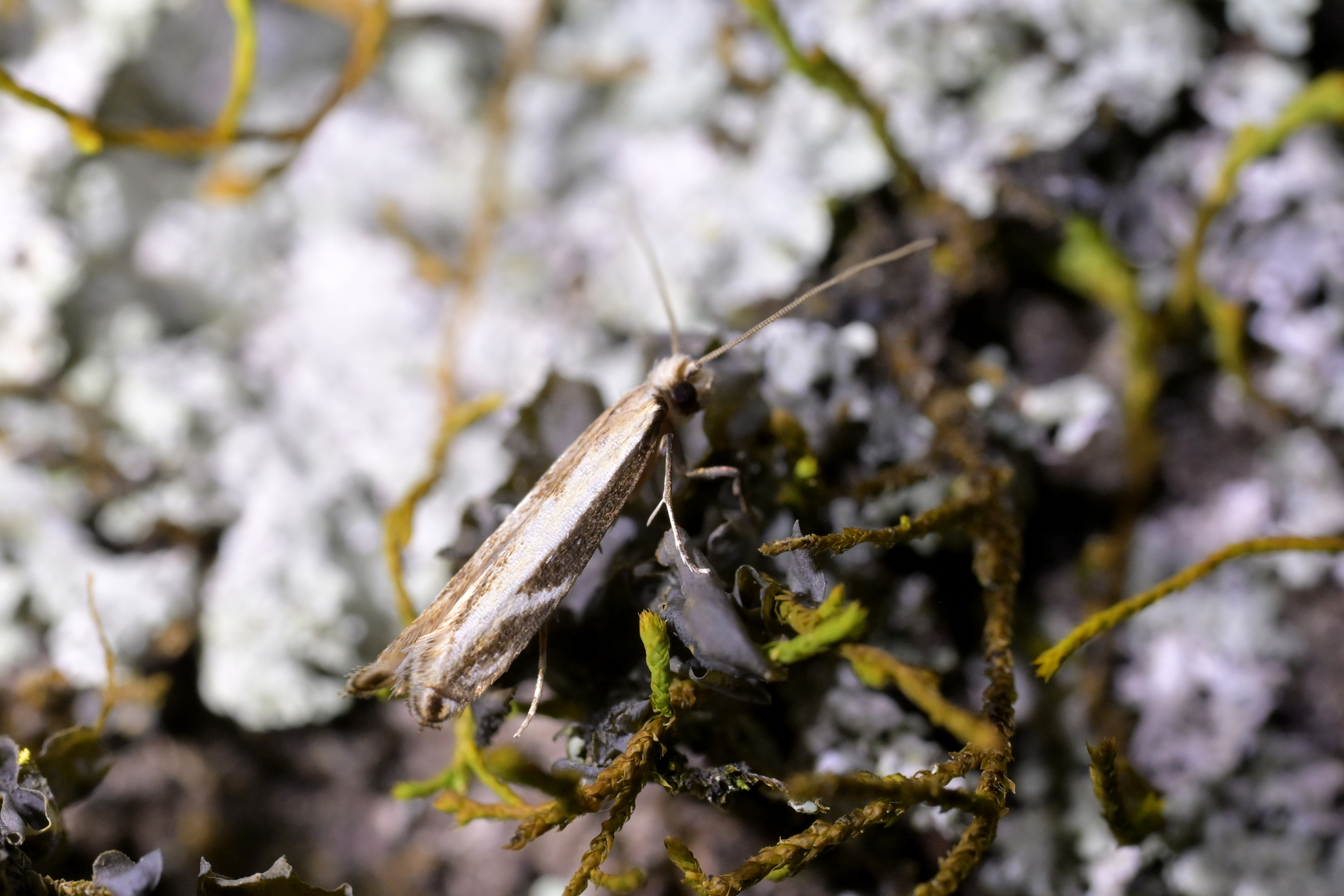
Living specimen of E. terminella.

This species inhabits native forest. The larvae of E. terminella feed under a web of silk and frass on the seeds as well as possibly the pods of Phormium tenax. They are also known to feed on the fruits of New Zealand species such as Meryta sinclairii. Larvae have been reared on the dead bark or stems of Lupinus arboreus, pear trees, and species in genus Tetragonia as well as the fruits of species in the genus Pittosporum.

== Behaviour ==
The larva of E. terminella are generally sluggish but can be very agile when disturbed. Adults are on the wing throughout the year and are attracted to light.
