= MJK =

MJK may refer to:

- Maynard James Keenan (born 1964), American rock singer
- Marinejegerkommandoen, Norwegian maritime special operation forces unit
- Shark Bay Airport, IATA airport code "MJK"
