= Henry Mangles Denham =

Royal Navy Admiral (1800–1887)

Admiral Sir Henry Mangles Denham FRS
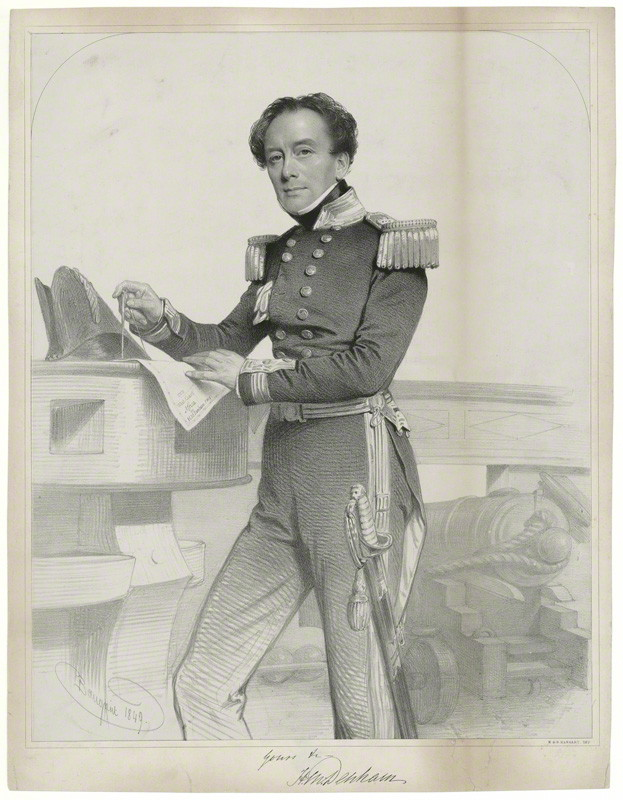
- Henry Mangles Denham (1849) by Charles Baugniet
- Born: 28 August 1800
- Died: 3 July 1887 (aged 86); 21 Carlton Road, Maida Vale, London
- Military career
- Allegiance: United Kingdom
- Branch: Royal Navy
- Service years: 1812–1871
- Rank: Admiral
- Commands: HMS Avon; HMS Herald; Pacific Station

Map of the Shark Bay area of Western Australia, surveyed by Denham.

Admiral Sir Henry Mangles Denham FRS (28 August 1800 – 3 July 1887) was a Royal Navy officer who went on to be Commander-in-Chief, Pacific Station.

== Early career ==
Denham joined the navy in 1809. He served on HMS Vulture between 1810 and 1814, initially under the command of Captain Martin White, engaged in survey work in the Channel Islands. He became a midshipman while serving on Vulture. He continued to work on the Channel Islands survey until 1817, again under White. In 1817, White took command of the survey vessel HMS Shamrock and Denham worked under him on surveys in the English Channel and Ireland. He was promoted to lieutenant in 1822. From October 1827, he was lieutenant-commander in HMS Linnet, surveying the coast of France. From September 1828 to March 1835, he surveyed the Bristol Channel and the ports of Liverpool and Milford.

In the early 1830s, the expansion of the Port of Liverpool was being severely restricted by the silting of the channels leading to the port. The Dock Trustees asked the Admiralty for help, and in 1833, Denham was assigned to survey the area. He carried out the most thorough survey of the Mersey and its approaches and analysed the volumes and patterns of flow and the quantities of solid material transported during tide. He argued that if the existing channels were becoming blocked, the tidal flow must be going somewhere else. He was able to identify and chart a new channel and mark it with buoys. This led to a significant increase in the volume of shipping that the port could handle. He was awarded the Freedom of the Borough of Liverpool in 1834, and in 1835, he became Resident Marine Surveyor to the port and in 1837, when shoaling became problematic on the outer part of the channel, he introduced an innovative system for dredging. This system involved using a steamer to tow a set of spiked cables spaced along an oak beam. The dredging method he introduced remained in use until 1890. On 28 February 1839, he elected as a Fellow of the Royal Society. According to Mountfield (1953), Denham's work during the 1830s and 1840s played a crucial role in establishing Liverpool as a major terminal port to meet the increasing demands of industrial trade in England

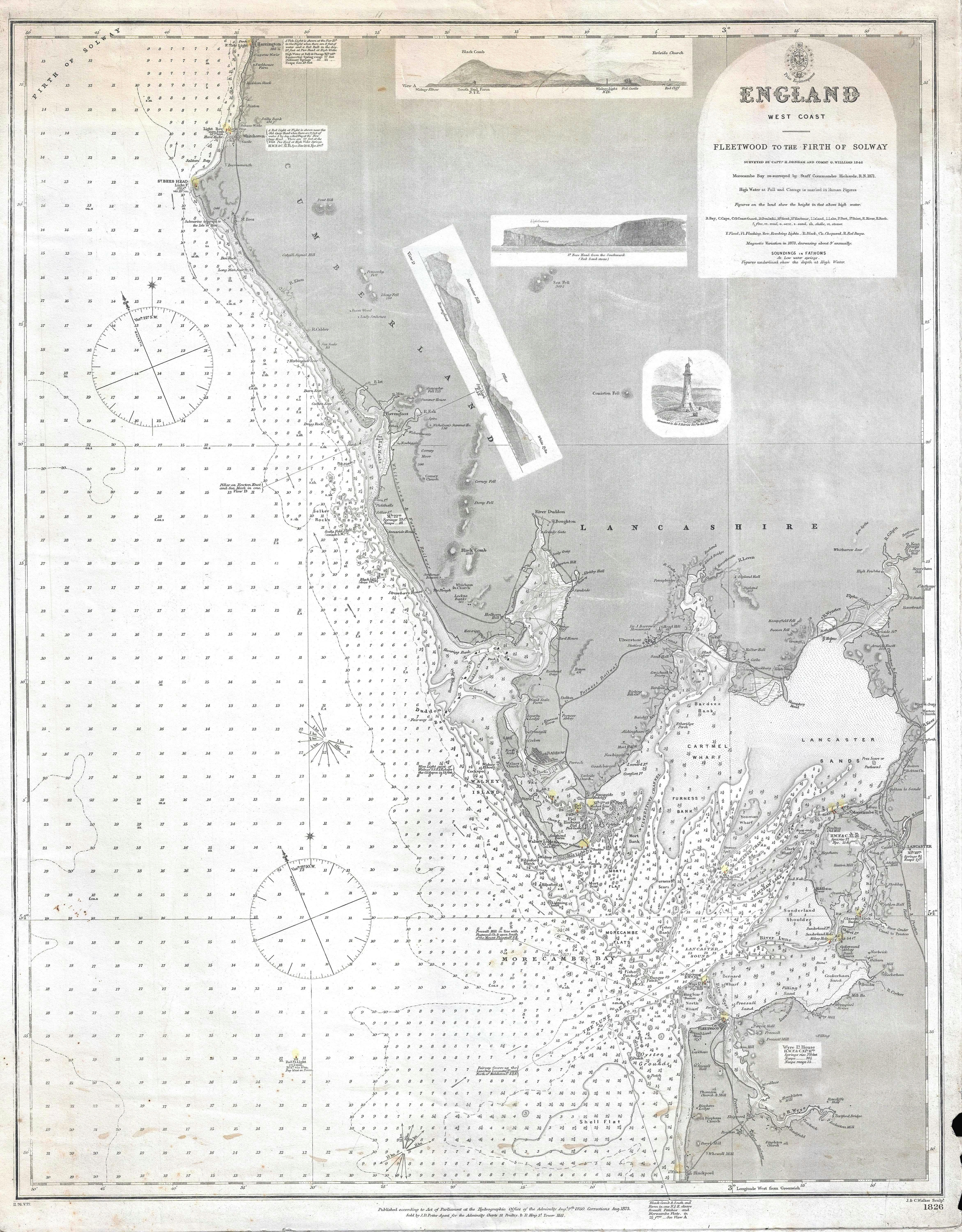
Admiralty Chart No 1826: Fleetwood to the Firth of Solway, Surveyed by Henry Denham and George Williams

Denham's time at Liverpool ended in discord, with Denham frustrated at the lack of resources available. This frustration reached its peak during the great storm of 1839. The storm caused lightships and buoys to be torn from their moorings, and Denham found himself unable to hire boats and crews to address the situation. Additionally, tension arose among some committee members who felt that Denham was exceeding his role by advocating changes in the management of port approaches, He proposed the establishment of a body with authority over the entire river estuary, rather than just the port. As a result, his appointment was terminated in 1839.

Denham remained in the NW of England for several years, being appointed by the Admiralty to survey the coasts of Lancashire and Cumberland. He published many of the results of his work in a set of Sailing directions for the area, published in 1840.

From 15 January 1842, Denham was commander (second in charge) in HMS Lucifer, commanded by Frederick William Beechey, surveying the coast of Ireland. On 30 July 1845, he was made commander of HMS Avon, surveying the west coast of Africa including the mouth of the Niger River. From 1848 to 1851 he was employed in conducting inquiries into accidents at sea.

== Survey of the South Pacific, 1852-1861 ==
On 18 February 1852, Denham was appointed captain of HMS Herald. (Note: The 500-ton Herald was launched as Termagant on 15 November 1822, recommissioned as the survey ship Herald in 1824, and taken out of service in 1864.) As captain of HMS Herald, he carried out major survey work around Australia, New Caledonia and other parts of the Southwest Pacific in the period 1852 to 1861.

The voyage of HMS Herald earned him a lasting place in the history of maritime surveying. For a decade, the Herald surveyed and charted known land masses and suspected hazards in the south-west Pacific and substantial parts of the Australian coast, These efforts were instrumental in establishing safe shipping routes. Many of the charts produced by the Herald's surveying expeditions are still utilised today. At the time of Denham's voyages, the south-west Pacific was a mission field, a site of commercial activity, and a colonial outpost. The natural history specimens gathered by naturalists William Grant Milne and John MacGillivray on the expedition made substantial contributions to botanical and ornithological collections.

The voyage began in England on 21 February 1852, arriving in Australia on 18 February 1853. On 30 October 1852, a deep-sea sounding taken on the passage between Rio de Janeiro and the Cape of Good Hope showed a depth of 7,706 fathoms (14,093 m). The ship then began its main survey by visiting Lord Howe Island, the Isle of Pines (New Caledonia) and Aneityum (Vanuatu) (19 February 1853 to 1 January 1854); New Zealand and Raoul Island, (2 January 1854 to 2 September 1854); Fiji, (3 September 1854 to 24 November 1854); and Norfolk Island (June 1855). After a second visit to Fiji, (25 June 1855 to 3 February 1856), the Herald was involved with the resettlement of the Pitcairn Islanders to Norfolk Island, (4 February 1856 to 26 June 1856). A third visit was then undertaken to Fiji, (27 June 1856 to 26 February 1857), followed by the survey of Port Jackson, New South Wales, (27 February 1857 to 20 December 1857); Bass Strait, King George Sound and Shark Bay (21 December 1857 to 29 June 1858). After three visits to the Coral Sea, (30 June 1858 to 23 May 1860), the Herald began the first leg of its homeward voyage, Sydney to Surabaya, (24 May 1860 to 20 November 1860), departing Surabaya on 21 November 1860 and arriving at Chatham on 1 June 1861.

== Commander-in-chief, Pacific ==
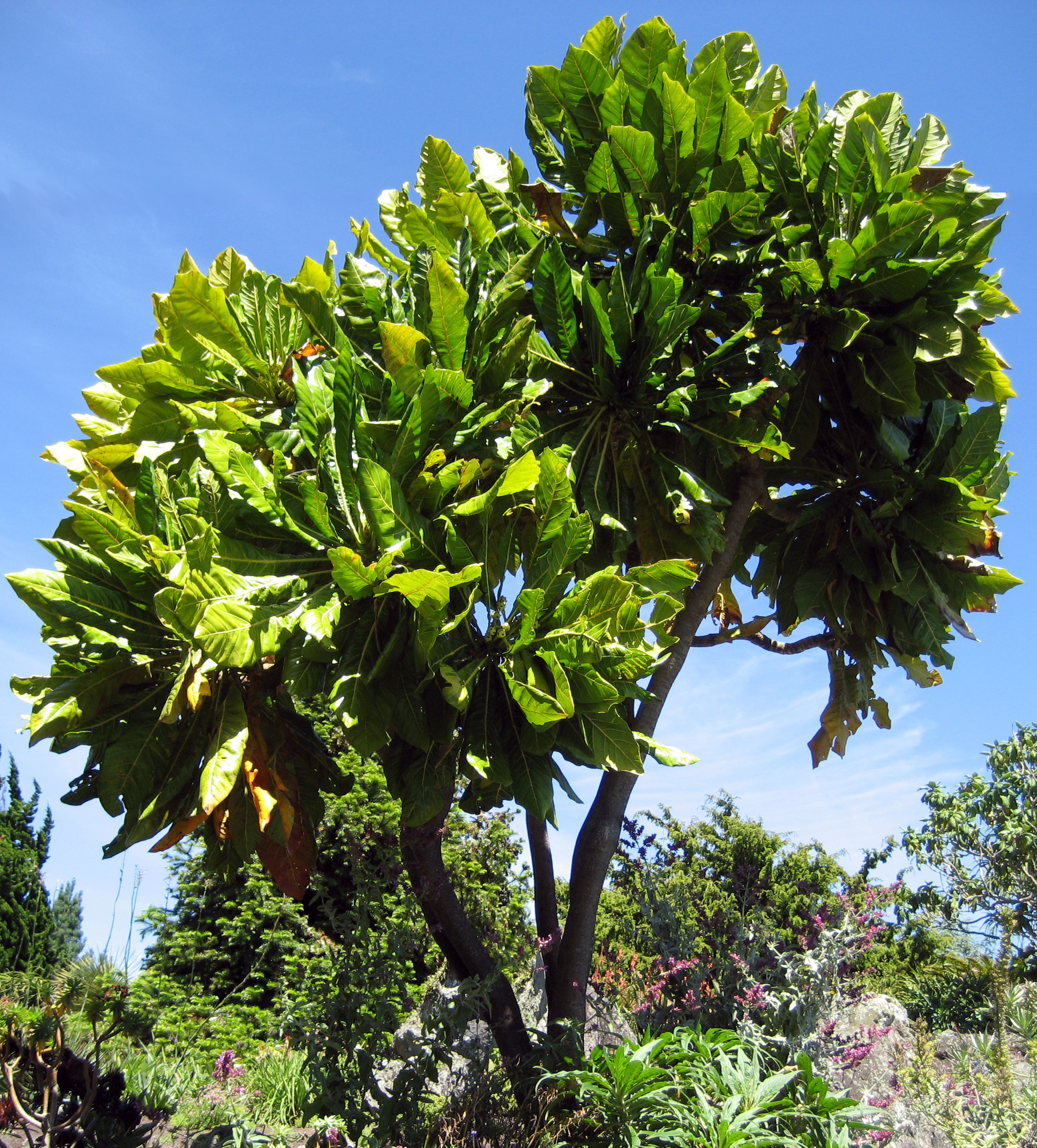
Meryta denhamii, a New Caledonian tree is also named in his honour

Denham was promoted to rear-admiral in March 1864. Between 10 May 1864 and 21 November 1866, Denham served as Commander-in-Chief, Pacific Station. He was placed on the retired list in April 1866. In 1867, he was knighted for his hydrographical services. In 1871, he was promoted on the retired list to the rank of vice admiral.

The town of Denham, Western Australia, was named after him, as is the New Caledonian endemic tree Meryta Denham Island, British Columbia, was named after him by a fellow Royal Navy surveyor.

== Family ==
In 1826, he married Isabella Cole, the daughter of the Reverend Joseph Cole of Carmarthen. Isabella died in 1865. Denham's son, Fleetwood James Denham, served under his father on Herald, tragically succumbing to a tropical fever at the age of 16 in 1854 while on Raoul Island, a part of New Zealand's Kermadec Islands chain. He was buried near the beach at the head of Denham Bay.

== See also ==
- O'Byrne, William Richard (1849). A Naval Biographical Dictionary . John Murray – via Wikisource.
- John MacGillivray
- William Grant Milne
- European and American voyages of scientific exploration

== Sources ==
- David, A. (1995). The voyage of HMS Herald to Australia and the South-west Pacific 1852-1861 under the command of Captain Henry Mangles Denham. Miegunyah Press Series. Carlton, Victoria: Melbourne University Press.
- Oliver, R. "The Vegetation of the Kermadec Islands". Transactions and Proceedings of the Royal Society of New Zealand. 42 (1909): 121.

Military offices
Preceded by Sir John Kingcome	Commander-in-Chief, Pacific Station; 1864–1866	Succeeded by George Hastings
