= Dunmall's snake =

Conservation status
- Data Deficient (IUCN 3.1)

Scientific classification
- Kingdom: Animalia
- Phylum: Chordata
- Class: Reptilia
- Order: Squamata
- Suborder: Serpentes
- Family: Elapidae
- Genus: Furina (snake)
- Species: F. dunmalli

Binomial name
- Furina dunmalli (Worrell, 1955)

Synonyms
- Glyphodon dunmalli Worrell, 1955; Furina dunmalli — Cogger, 2000

Species of snake

Dunmall's snake (Furina dunmalli) is a species of venomous snake in the family Elapidae. The species is endemic to Australia.

== Etymology ==
The specific name, dunmalli, is in honor of William "Bill" Dunmall, who collected the type specimen.

== Geographic range ==
F. dunmalli has a patchy distribution in southeastern Queensland and the border area with New South Wales from Yelarbon; Texas, Queensland; and Ashford. Westerly distribution is in the Carnarvon National Park, and north to Rockhampton on the coast, and Clermont west of the Great Dividing Range.

== Habitat ==
The preferred natural habitats of F. dunmalli are forest and shrubland, at altitudes of 200–500 m (660–1,640 ft).

== Behavior ==
F. dunmalli is terrestrial and nocturnal.

== Diet ==
F. dunmalli preys upon small lizards.

== Reproduction ==
F. dunmalli is oviparous.
