= Denham Island (British Columbia) =

Island in British Columbia, Canada

Coordinates: 50°47′10″N 126°29′40″W

Denham Island is an islet north of Sonora Island (British Columbia) in Cordero Channel, near the mouth of Bute Inlet in British Columbia, Canada.

It was named after Admiral Henry Mangles Denham, a noted Royal Navy surveyor, by Captain Pender, master RN in 1864.
