= Meryta mauruensis =

Conservation status
- Data Deficient (IUCN 2.3)

Scientific classification
- Kingdom: Plantae
- Clade: Embryophytes
- Clade: Tracheophytes
- Clade: Angiosperms
- Clade: Eudicots
- Clade: Asterids
- Order: Apiales
- Family: Araliaceae
- Genus: Meryta
- Species: M. mauruensis

Binomial name
- Meryta mauruensis Nadeaud (1897)

Species of plant

Meryta mauruensis is a species of plant in the family Araliaceae. It is a tree endemic to the island of Tahiti in the Society Islands of French Polynesia.
