= Ocean Park Aquarium =

Zoo in Western Australia, Australia

- Interactive map of Ocean Park Aquarium
- 25°58′49″S 113°33′34″E
- Date opened: 1999
- Location: 1 Ocean Park Rd, Shark Bay, Western Australia, Australia
- Website: oceanpark.com.au

Ocean Park Aquarium is a privately owned open-to-public oceanarium located approximately 10 kilometres (6.2 mi) south of Denham in the Shark Bay area of Western Australia that is a major tourism drawcard in the area. Visitors can experience marine creatures on display such as coralfish, butterflyfish, clownfish, lionfish, stonefish, moray eel, stingrays, sea snakes, octopus and crustaceans in the indoor aquarium centre.

The oceanarium's flagship display is the 3.5-megalitre (920,000 US gal) Shark Lagoon where kingfish, trevally and estuary cod cohabitate with sandbar shark, sicklefin lemon sharks and tiger shark which are publicly fed six times daily. The lagoon is the largest such exhibit in Western Australia. Diving experiences, shark feedings and other tours are also available to visitors for additional costs. The oceanarium prides itself on being eco-friendly and has won several tourism and education awards. The aquarium offers some degree of protection to key species particularly to loggerhead turtles that often undergo rehabilitation following injury or exhaustion after being carried too far south.
