= Denham Airport =

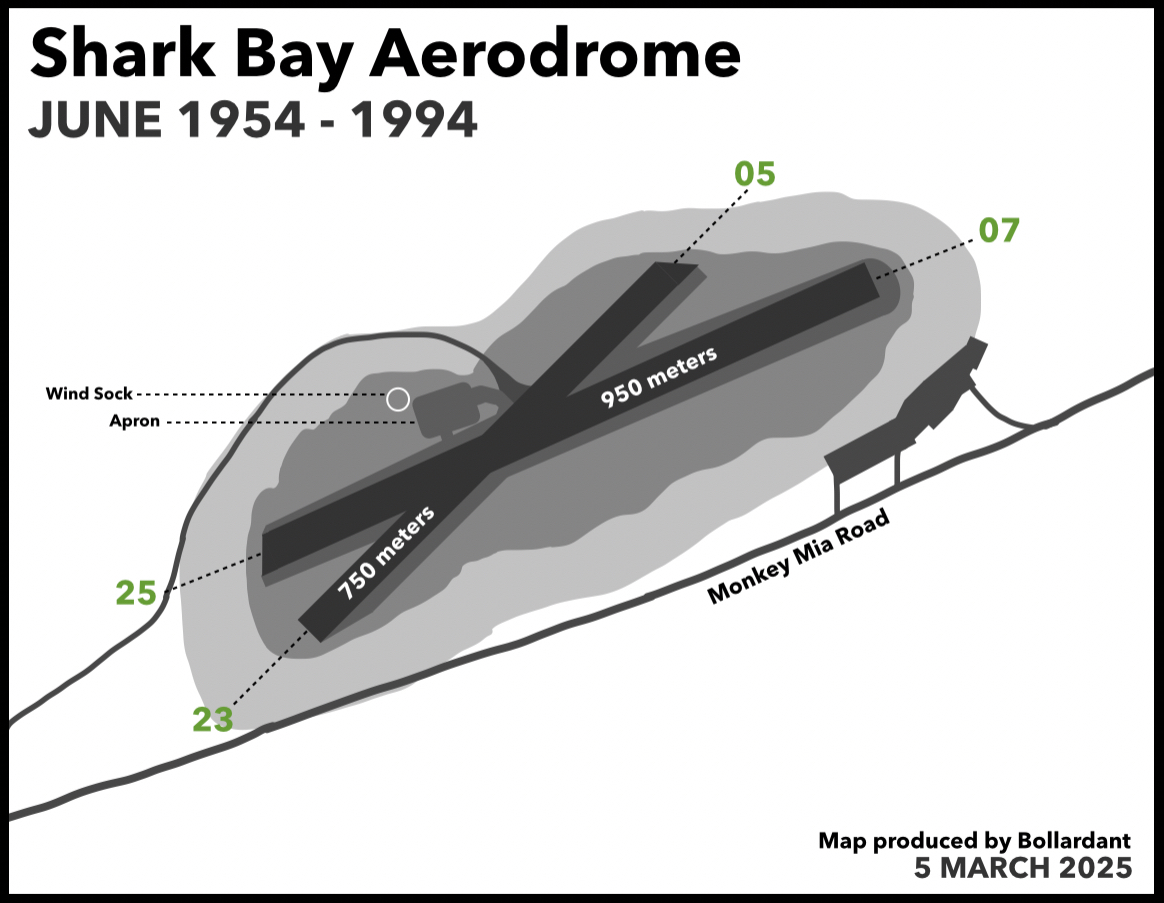
- Map oriented north depicting the former Denham Airport (Shark Bay Aerodrome).
- IATA: DNM; ICAO: YDHM

Summary
- Airport type: Defunct
- Operator: Department of Civil Aviation
- Serves: Denham, Western Australia
- Location: Shark Bay, Peron Peninsula, Western Australia
- Opened: June 1954
- Closed: 1993
- Passenger services ceased: 1993
- Interactive map of Denham Airport

Runways
Direction	Length		Surface
Direction	ft	m	Surface
25/07	3,116	950	Gravel/dirt
23/05	2,461	750	Gravel/dirt

Denham Airport also known as Shark Bay Aerodrome (IATA: DNM, ICAO: YDHM) served the town of Denham from 1954 until the construction of Shark Bay Airport in 1994. It is located in Peron Peninsula, Western Australia.

== History ==
On 14 May, 1935, the residents of Denham asked Senator Johnston, whom had arrived a day earlier to secure an aerodrome in Shark Bay, and also a trunk telephone to Geraldton. On 26 January, 1952, a petition was signed by 59 residents of Denham for the construction of an aerodrome near the town, however, 100 residents was the minimal requirement for an airport which wasn't met. The nearest aerodrome was located 70 miles (112 km) away at the Hamelin station, and that the town of Denham was considered the loneliest in the state. There were no mail or medical services for the town and no transport for residents without vehicles. On 6 January 1953, Minister of Transport and Shipping Senator McLeay was pressured for the construction of the airport, which Secretary of the Shark Bay Aerodrome committee Mr W. H. Grigo addressed and forwarded transport problems to. Additionally, the town also did not receive coastal shipping services, and there was only a local fishing company which ran a truck once a fortnight to Geraldton to bring in Mail and vegetables. Following this, the minister had promised the construction of the airport.

=== Construction ===
On 7 January, 1954, the aerodrome commenced construction as D.C.A. men, equipment, and Airport Inspector Ray Stenberg left for Shark Bay. Work was organised by the local constable and material transport provide by local stations. By 4 March, workmen from Hamelin Pool Station resume on the construction, including the installation of new communication lines to the airport. On 15 March, Denham Airport received finishing touches. The new strip was located 22 miles from the town, and was seen as a good example of voluntary effort. Construction faced several delays due to weather. On 6 May, the aerodrome had completed construction, and a final inspection was to be made by April. On 1 April, the aerodrome had a water issue, as the well had collapsed. An investigation was held by District Airport Inspector Frank Mumme and a groundsmen, with further repairs planned. On 26 April, a spokesman for the Mac-Robertson-Miller Aviation Co. Pty. Ltd. stated that the inspection of the aerodrome was to be completed in a few days, and afterwards it would license regular flights by MMA aircraft. After the inspections, Denham Airport would begin servicing north-bound aircraft each Tuesday and south-bound aircraft each Friday by MMA. The aerodrome was managed by the Department of Civil Aviation (DCA). In June 1954, rainfall delayed work and the opening, and residents of Shark Bay received no word afterwards.

=== Opening ===
On 1 November, 1954, the first plane landed, being a Douglas DC-3. Three days later on 4 November, 1954, a scheduled passenger service opened to Denham Airport. It would be operating southbound MMA Douglas DC-3 every Sunday afternoon, which was chosen following arrangements made by the townspeople for deciding the best day. Denham Airport along with Leopard Downs, Nerrima, Gordon Downs, and Marble Bar had brought the number of MMA stops to a milestone of 101. The airport consisted of two airstrips, however only one was only approved by the DCA. As the town caught fish for a living, the goods was transported to Perth via freight aircraft. Being a stop for MMA, it had a route agent at Denham Trading Co. In 1968, the route agent was later updated, now in the Shark Bay district Co-op, with the IATA code “Sky” being assigned to the airport.

The aerodrome was managed under local ownership by 1977. In April 1989, Western Airlines commenced a subsidised service from Perth through Geraldton to Kalbarri, Useless Loop and Denham. The airline would operate three daily services from the airport, handling annual passenger numbers reaching 100,000 by 1994. On 25 August, 1992, a Beechcraft 58 Baron shortly after taking off from Denham Airport had crashed, killing 6 people aboard the craft. An investigation determined that the crash was caused by engine failure from fuel exhaustion.

== Closure ==
In the late 1980s, the construction of a new airport was proposed. Two sites were selected and inspected for the Airport Syndicate, and the new Shark Bay Airport was opened in October 1993. The old Denham Airport closed afterwards.

Reserve 29432–the plot that contained the disused airfield—was added to Francois Peron National Park on 25 May 1999.
