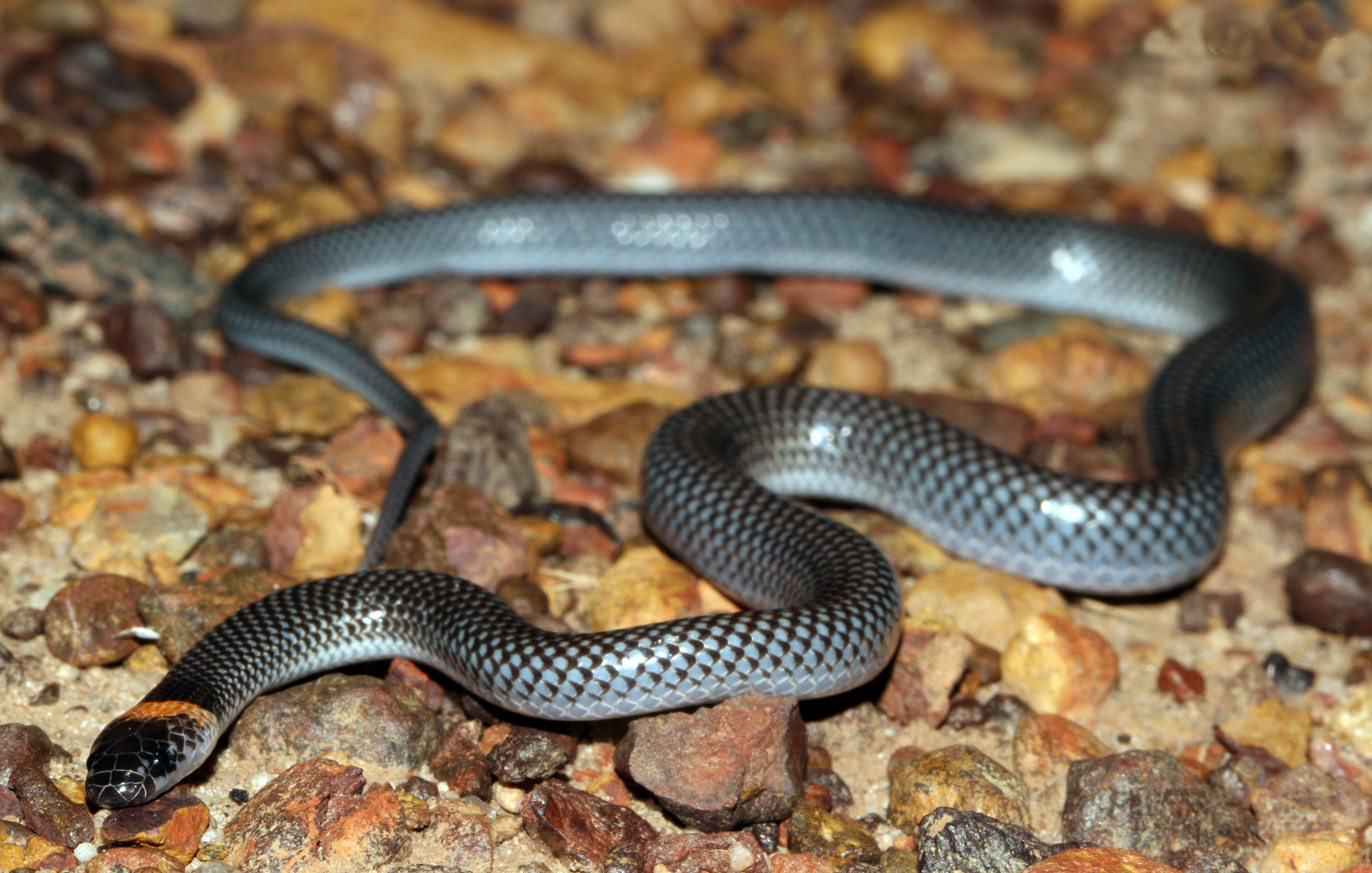
- Orange-naped snake (Furina ornata)

Scientific classification
- Kingdom: Animalia
- Phylum: Chordata
- Class: Reptilia
- Order: Squamata
- Suborder: Serpentes
- Family: Elapidae
- Subfamily: Hydrophiinae
- Genus: Furina (snake); A.M.C. Duméril, 1853

= Furina (snake) =

Genus of snakes

Furina is a genus of venomous elapid snakes endemic to Australia. It contains five species of which there are no subspecies.

== Species ==
Species	Authority	Common name	Geographic range
F. barnardi	(Kinghorn, 1939)	Yellow-naped snake	Australia (north-east Queensland, from Port Curtis in the south to Cape York Peninsula)
F. diadema	(Schlegel, 1837)	Red-naped snake	Australia (New South Wales, Queensland, South Australia, Victoria)
F. dunmalli	(Worrell, 1955)	Dunmall's snake	Australia (south-east Queensland)
F. ornata	(Gray, 1842)	Orange-naped snake	Australia (Northern Territory, Queensland, South Australia, Western Australia)
F. tristis	(Günther, 1858)	Brown-headed snake	Australia (Queensland, Cape York Peninsula), Islands of Torres Strait, Papua New Guinea (south-east Irian Jaya)
