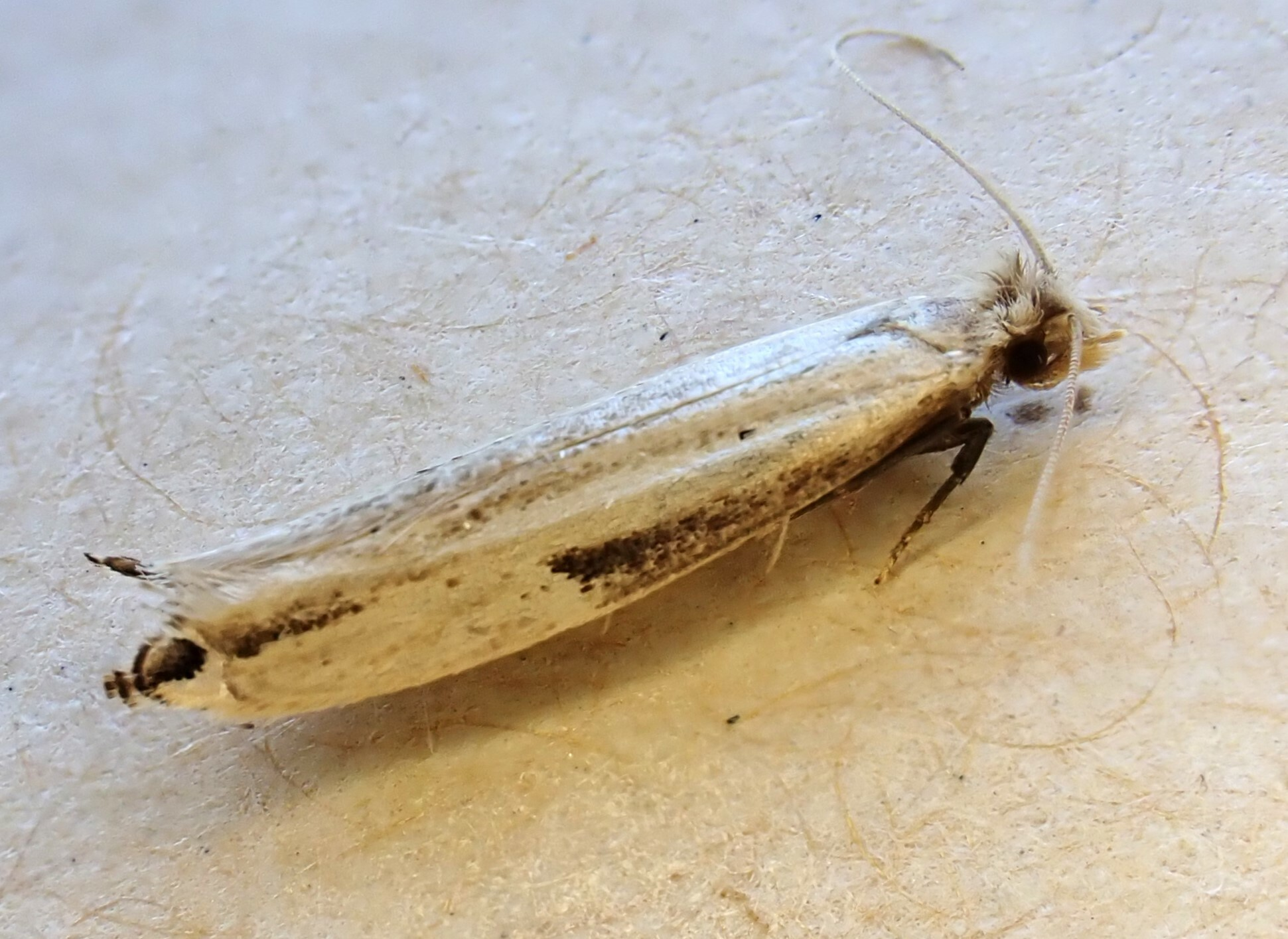

Scientific classification
- Kingdom: Animalia
- Phylum: Arthropoda
- Clade: Pancrustacea
- Class: Insecta
- Order: Lepidoptera
- Family: Tineidae
- Genus: Erechthias
- Species: E. hemiclistra

Binomial name
- Erechthias hemiclistra (Meyrick, 1911)

Synonyms
- Decadarchis hemiclistra Meyrick, 1911

= Erechthias hemiclistra =

Species of moth endemic to New Zealand

Erechthias hemiclistra is a species of moth of the family Tineidae. It was first described by Edward Meyrick in 1911. This species is endemic to New Zealand and has been observed in both the North and South Islands. It inhabits native forest and has an affinity for species in the genera Phormium, Cortaderia and Cordyline, likely as a result of its larvae feeding on dead fibre sourced from plant species in these genera. Adults are on the wing from September to April but are most commonly observed in December and January. Adults are also attracted to light.

== Taxonomy ==
E. hemiclistra was first described by Edward Meyrick in 1911 and was originally named Decadarchis hemiclistra. Meyrick obtained the specimens for this original description from George Hudson who reared this moth from caterpillars and cocoons obtained at Mākara using the flower stems of Chionochloa conspicua. In 1914 Meyrick assigned this species to the genus Erechthias. In 1927 Alfred Philpott studied and illustrated the male genitalia of specimens of E. hemiclistra. George Hudson discussed and illustrated this species in his 1928 book The butterflies and moths of New Zealand. In 1988 John S. Dugdale confirmed the placement of this species in the genus Erechthias. The female lectotype originating from Mākara is held at the Natural History Museum, London.

== Description ==
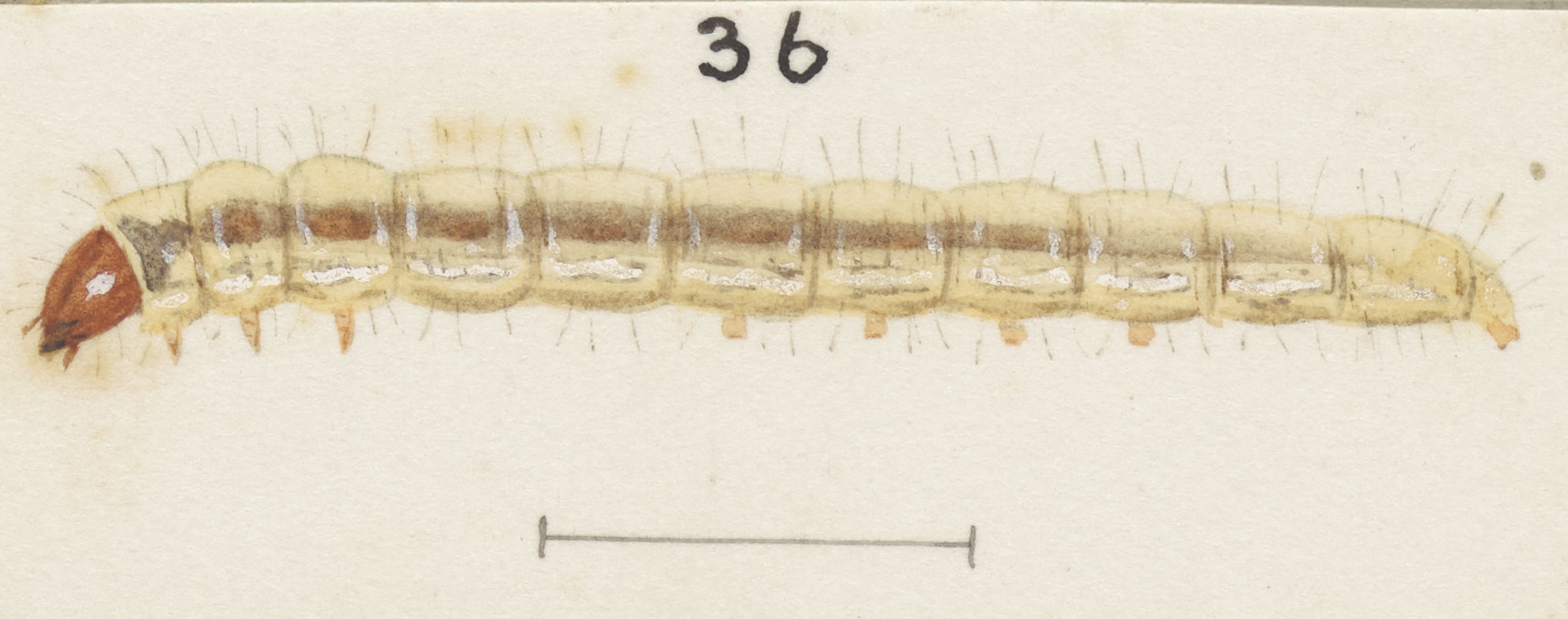
Larva

Hudson described the larva of this species as follows:

Its length, when full-grown, is slightly over 1/2 inch, very elongate tapering posteriorly and much flattened above; general colour ochreous with a brown dorsal stripe, indicating the position of the alimentary canal; the head is reddish-brown and very shining; the second segment dull brown and semi-transparent; there is whitish raised lateral ridge and similar intersegmental ridges; the legs and prolegs are very small, ochreous-brown and the whole larva is sparingly clothed with long bristles.

The larva of this species is similar in appearance to that of Erechthias terminella but is somewhat larger.

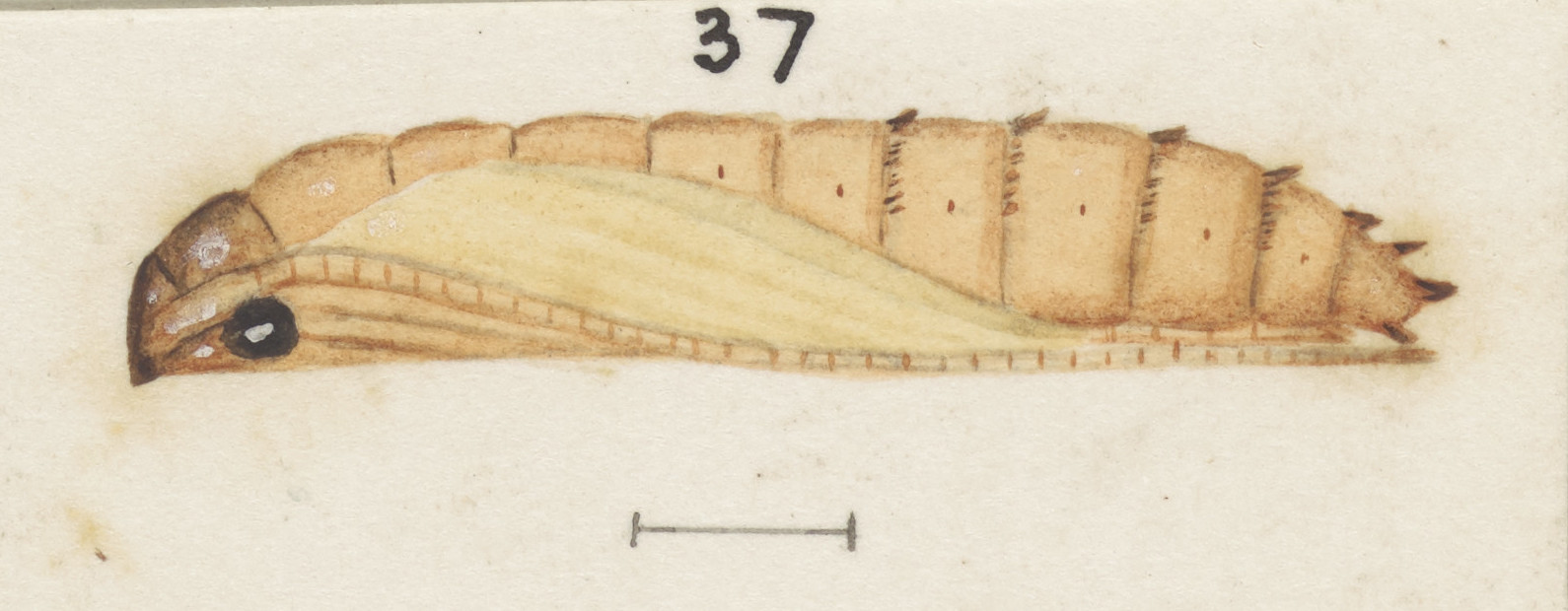
Pupa

Hudson also described the pupa as follows:

The pupa is about 1/4 inch long, elongate, pale brown, darker on the back; the very prominent eye-ease and thoracic shield are dark blackish-brown and shining; the antennae extend to the end of the body and the wing-cases are pale ochreous.

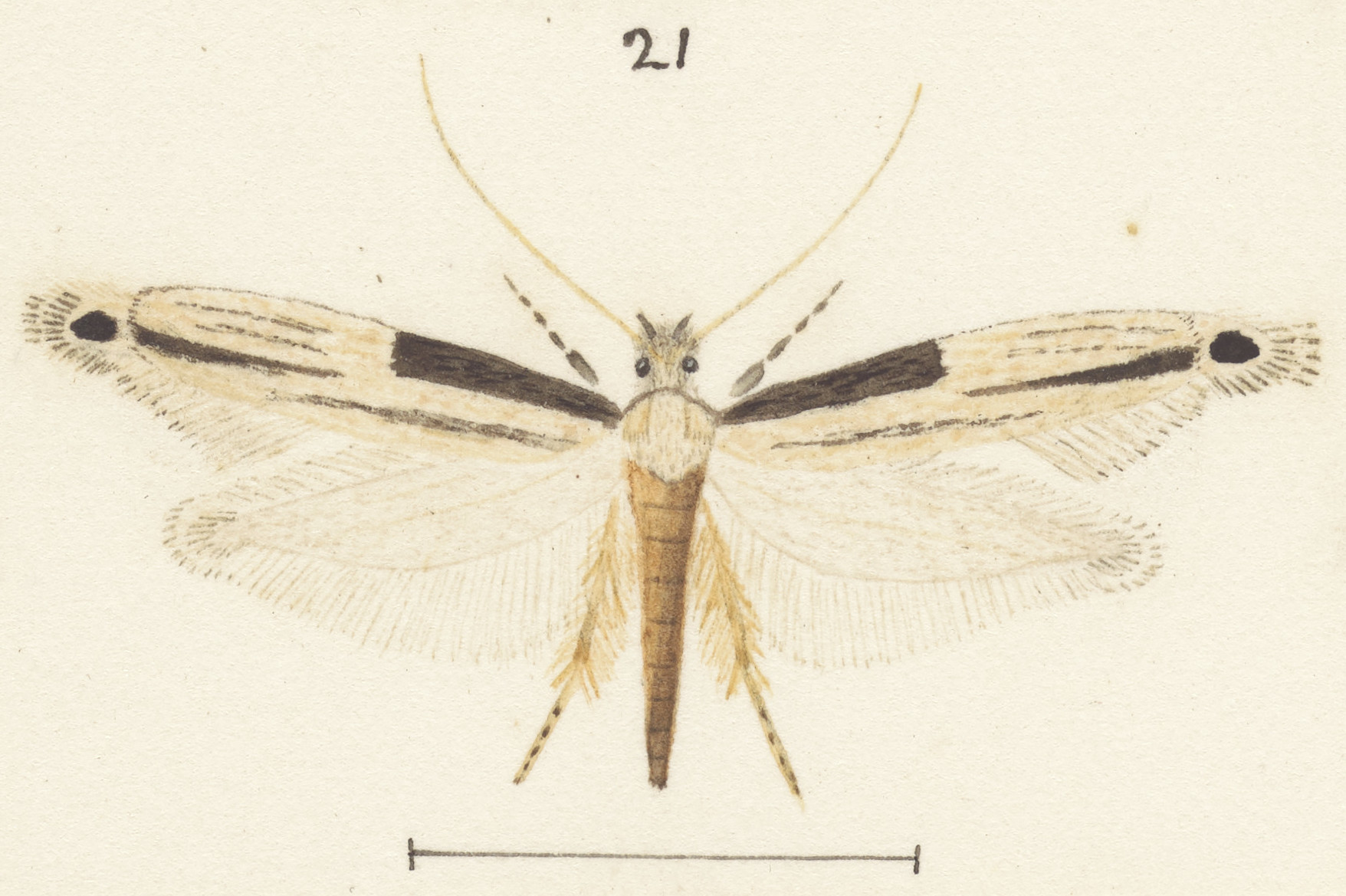
Female adult

Meyrick originally described the adults of this species as follows:

♂ 15-17 mm., ♀ 22 mm. Head and thorax ochreous-whitish, sometimes brownish-tinged, hairs of forehead sometimes mixed with dark fuscous. Palpi whitish, second joint suffused externally with dark fuscous, beneath with whitish projecting scales increasing to apex, terminal joint moderate, slender, with appressed scales. Antennae fuscous-whitish. Abdomen whitish-fuscous. Forewings elongate, narrow, costa moderately arched, apex round-pointed, termen slightly sinuate, extremely oblique; ochreous-white, on dorsal half and towards apex in ♂ tinged with brownish, in ♀ more strongly infuscated, with variable scattered dark-fuscous and black scales, especially in ♀; a dark-fuscous streak along costa from base to middle, posteriorly dilated and truncate; an elongate suffused dark-fuscous mark beneath costa about 2/3; a blackish-fuscous streak from 2/3 of disc to apex, interrupted before apex, edged above with an ochreous-whitish line : cilia ochreous-whitish, with more or less marked dark-fuscous post median line, at apex with a blackish bar, round apex with a blackish-fuscous subbasal shade. Hindwings in ♂ whitish - grey, in ♀ light grey; cilia ochreous-whitish.

== Distribution ==
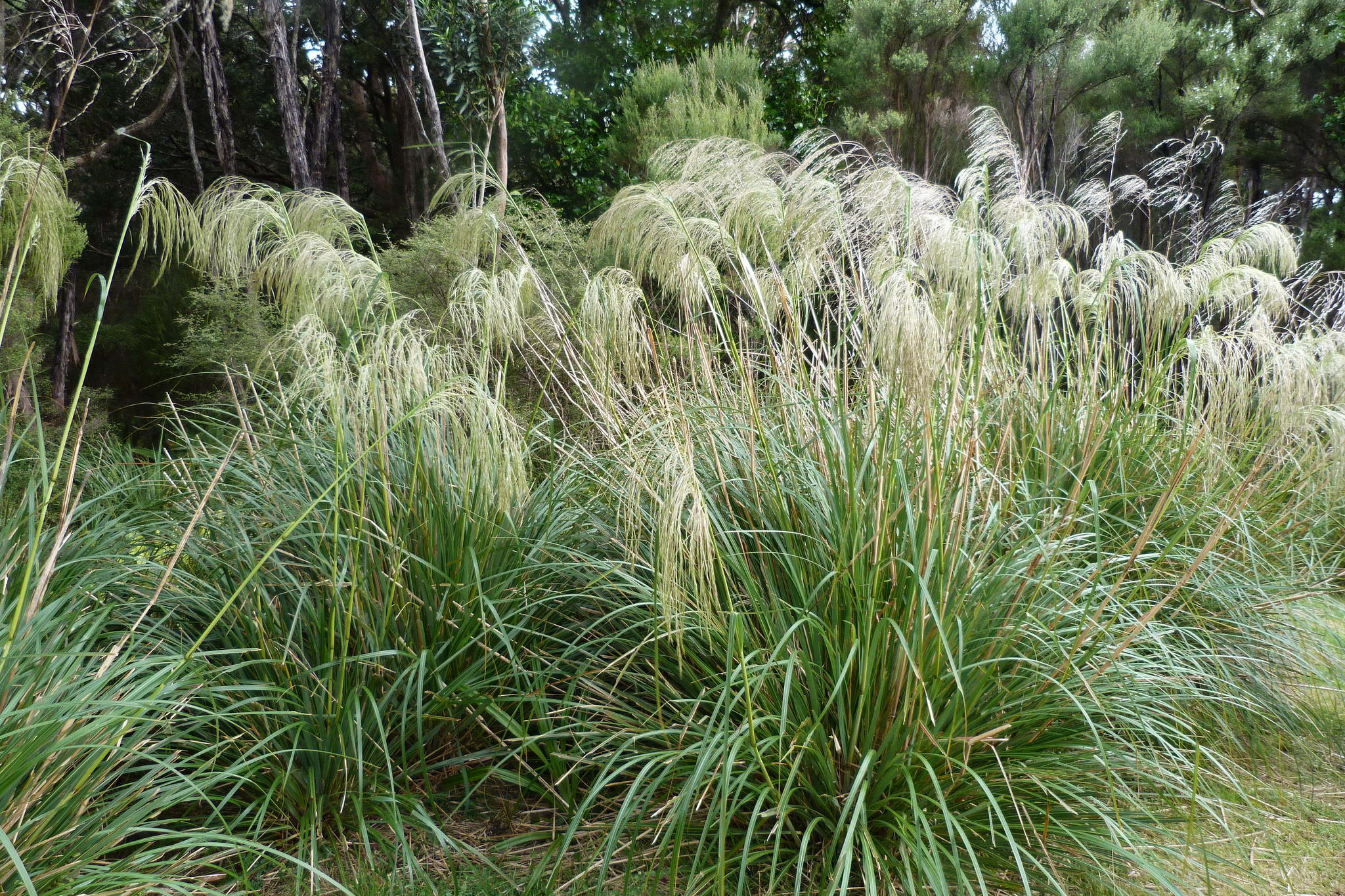
Chionochloa conspicua, the species used to rear E. hemiclistra

E. hemiclistra is endemic to New Zealand. It has been observed in both the North and South Islands. Hudson regarded this species as uncommon.

== Habitat and hosts ==
The food of the larvae of E. hemiclistra is likely dead monocotyledonous fibre such as the dead flower stalks of Phormium and Cortaderia. Adults have been beaten from cabbage trees and have been observed on Cordyline indivisa.

== Behaviour ==
Reared adults have emerged in November and February. Adults in the wild are on the wing from September until April but are most commonly observed in December and January. Adults of this species are attracted to light and have been collected via this trapping method.
