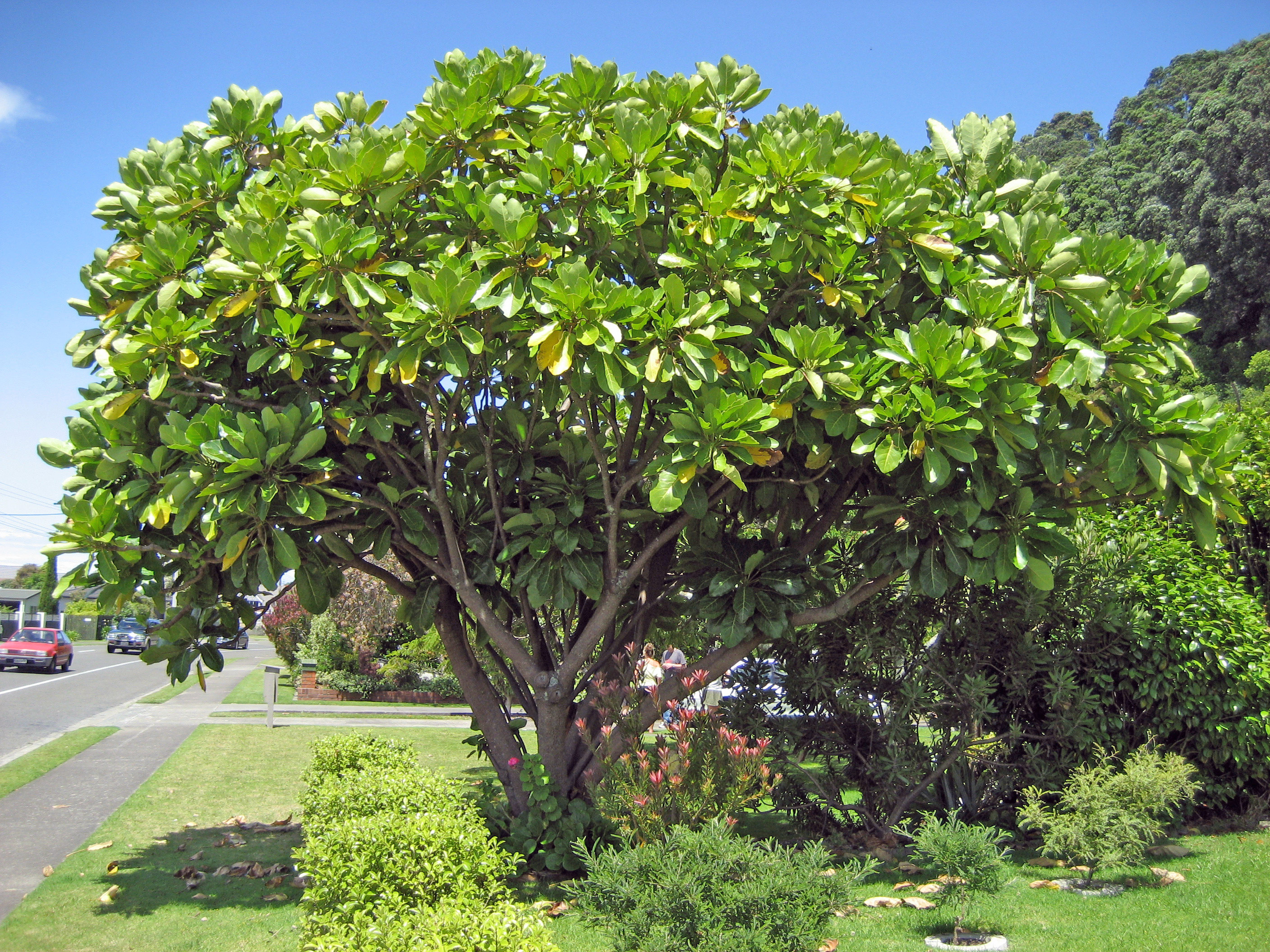
- Meryta sinclairii from New Zealand

Scientific classification
- Kingdom: Plantae
- Clade: Tracheophytes
- Clade: Angiosperms
- Clade: Eudicots
- Clade: Asterids
- Order: Apiales
- Family: Araliaceae
- Subfamily: Aralioideae
- Genus: Meryta; J.R.Forst. & G.Forst.

Type species
- Meryta lanceolata J.R.Forst. & G.Forst.

Species
- Meryta angustifolia; Meryta balansae; Meryta brachypoda; Meryta capitata; Meryta choristantha; Meryta coriacea; Meryta denhamii; Meryta drakeana; Meryta lanceolata; Meryta latifolia; Meryta lucida; Meryta macrophylla; Meryta malietoa; Meryta mauluulu; Meryta mauruensis; Meryta neoebudica; Meryta oxylaena; Meryta pachycarpa; Meryta pandanicarpa; Meryta pastoralis; Meryta pauciflora; Meryta raiateensis; Meryta salicifolia; Meryta schizolaena; Meryta senfftiana; Meryta sinclairii; Meryta sonchifolia; Meryta tenuifolia

Synonyms
- Botryodendrum Endl.; Botryomeryta R.Vig.; Schizomeryta R.Vig.; Strobilopanax R.Vig.

= Meryta =

Genus of plants

Meryta is a genus in the flowering plant family Araliaceae. There are 28 described species in the genus and a number of undescribed species, all small, resinous trees of the subtropical and tropical Pacific Ocean, characterized by huge, simple leaves and a dioecious sexual system, a unique combination in Araliaceae. Meryta has its center of diversity in New Caledonia (11 endemic spp.). Phylogenetic analyses have placed Meryta as a monophyletic genus in one of the three major clades of the Araliaciae, the Polyscias-Pseudopanax group, and more specifically in the Pacific Schefflera subclade.

== Cultivation ==
Cultivation of Meryta species is possible in tropical or subtropical climates. They are valued for their dramatic foliage and tolerance of coastal conditions. Species encountered in cultivation include M. denhamii and M. sonchifolia, native to New Caledonia, M. latifolia, native to Norfolk Island, and the New Zealand species Meryta sinclairii.
