= Denham Bay =

Bay of Raoul Island, New Zealand

Coordinates: 29.2609°S 177.9522°W

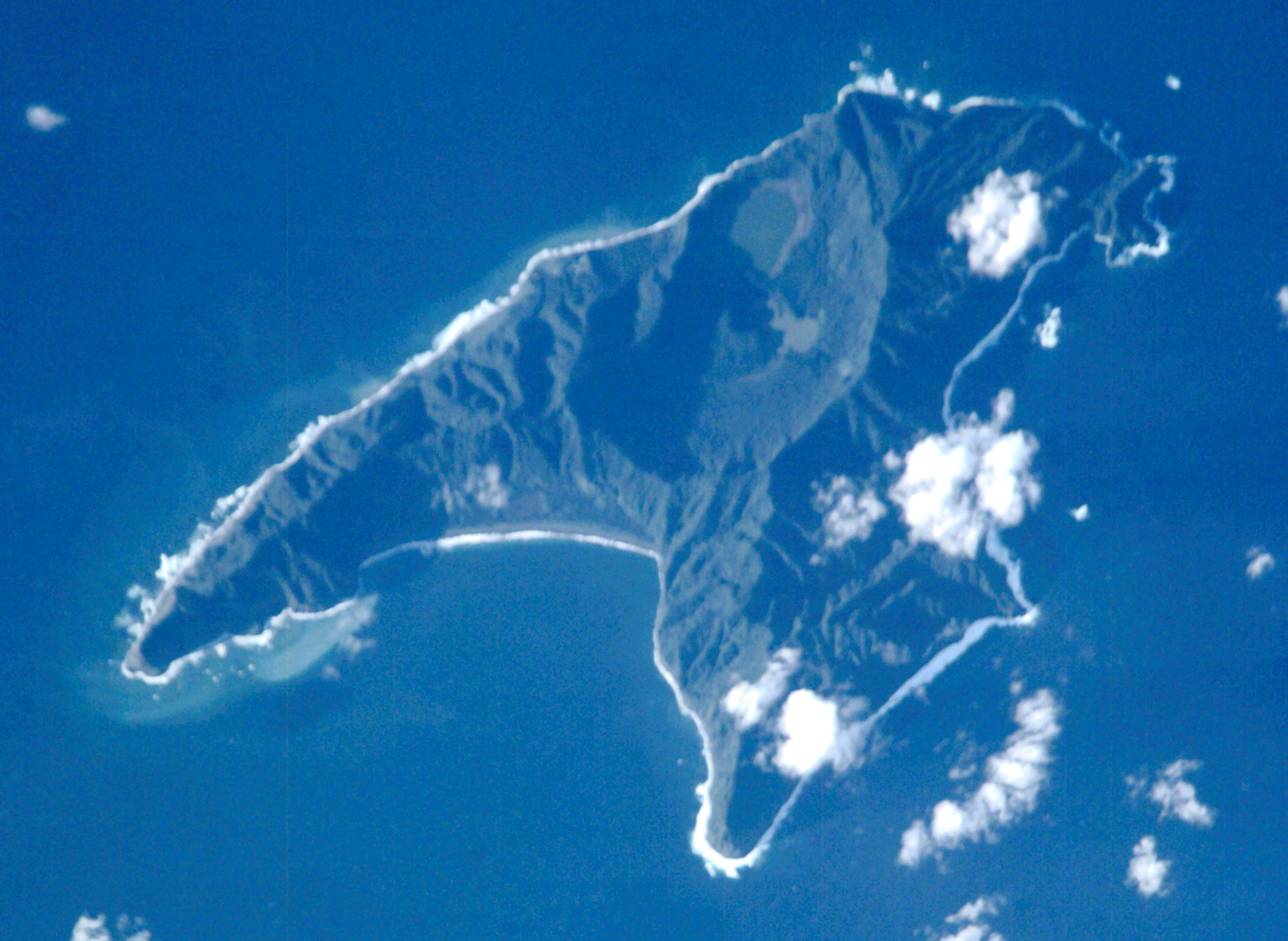
In this satellite view of Raoul Island, north is at top left. The deep indentation of Denham Bay stretches along the west coast, seen here at lower left.

Denham Bay is a large bay which stretches along the entire west coast of Raoul Island in New Zealand's Kermadec Islands chain, from Hutchison Bluff in the north to Smith Bluff in the south. The bay gave its name to the Denham Bay caldera, which was formed some 2,200 years ago by a massive volcanic eruption.

Denham Bay was named for Captain Henry Mangles Denham of HMS Herald, who charted the island in July 1854, and for his son Fleetwood James Denham, who died from a tropical fever at the age of sixteen, and was buried near the beach at the head of Denham Bay, alongside the small number of graves from early settlers on the island.
