= Meryta lanceolata =

Conservation status
- Near Threatened (IUCN 3.1)

Scientific classification
- Kingdom: Plantae
- Clade: Tracheophytes
- Clade: Angiosperms
- Clade: Eudicots
- Clade: Asterids
- Order: Apiales
- Family: Araliaceae
- Genus: Meryta
- Species: M. lanceolata

Binomial name
- Meryta lanceolata J.R.Forst. & G.Forst. (1776)

Synonyms
- Botryodendrum taitense Guill. (1837); Neara longifolia Sol. ex Seem. (1866)

Species of plant

Meryta lanceolata is a species of flowering plant in the family Araliaceae. Similar to other members of its genus. It is characterized by glossy leaves that typically cluster near the ends of its branches. It uses a dioecious sexual system.

The species is endemic to the islands of Bora Bora and Tahiti in the Society Islands of French Polynesia. It has been assessed as Near Threatened by the IUCN Red List.
