= Meryta sonchifolia =

Conservation status
- Vulnerable (IUCN 2.3)

Scientific classification
- Kingdom: Plantae
- Clade: Tracheophytes
- Clade: Angiosperms
- Clade: Eudicots
- Clade: Asterids
- Order: Apiales
- Family: Araliaceae
- Genus: Meryta
- Species: M. sonchifolia

Binomial name
- Meryta sonchifolia (Linden) Linden & André

Synonyms
- Aralia sonchifolia Linden

Species of plant

Meryta sonchifolia is a species of plant in the family Araliaceae. It is endemic to New Caledonia.
