= Brown-headed snake =

Conservation status
- Least Concern (IUCN 3.1)

Scientific classification
- Kingdom: Animalia
- Phylum: Chordata
- Class: Reptilia
- Order: Squamata
- Suborder: Serpentes
- Family: Elapidae
- Genus: Furina (snake)
- Species: F. tristis

Binomial name
- Furina tristis Günther, 1858

Species of snake

The brown-headed snake (Furina tristis) is a small venomous reptile native to the Cape York peninsula in northeastern Australia.

== Diet ==
Brown-headed snakes mainly eat skinks of the genus Sphenomorphus.
