= Shark Bay Airport =

Airport in Western Australia

Monkey Mia Airport
- IATA: MJK; ICAO: YSHK

Summary
- Airport type: Public
- Owner: Shire of Shark Bay
- Operator: RAC Tourism Assets Pty Ltd
- Serves: Denham
- Location: Denham, Shark Bay, Western Australia
- Opened: 1994
- Elevation AMSL: 111 ft / 34 m
- Coordinates: 25°53′36″S 113°34′36″E

Map
- Location in Western Australia

Runways
Direction	Length		Surface
Direction	m	ft	Surface
18/36	1,690	5,545	Asphalt
- Sources: AIP

Monkey Mia Airport (IATA: MJK, ICAO: YSHK), also known as Shark Bay Airport, is an airport located on the Peron Peninsula within the Shark Bay World Heritage Site in the Gascoyne region serving Monkey Mia, a resort in Western Australia, and the nearby town of Denham.

== History ==
In the late 1980s, the construction of a new airport was proposed, however, it was on Aboriginal land. Site surveys were conducted, which was assessed for the Airport Syndicate.

Monkey Mia Airport was then built in 1994 to replace the old Denham Airport, which the State Government funded $67,600 for. In October 2004, the State Government additionally funded $18,200 for the project, which when complete could allow aircraft to use the airstrip 24/7. This was a part of the broader 2003-04 Regional Airports Development Scheme funding round, which were to allocate $2 million towards 37 airport projects. On 20 December 2011, Monkey Mia Airport was assigned as a category 6 security controlled airport under regulation 3.0 IB of the Aviation Transport Security Regulations 2005.

== Airlines and destinations ==
Airlines	Destinations
Rex Airlines	Carnarvon, Perth

== See also ==
- List of airports in Western Australia
- Aviation transport in Australia
