= Meryta salicifolia =

Conservation status
- Endangered (IUCN 3.1)

Scientific classification
- Kingdom: Plantae
- Clade: Tracheophytes
- Clade: Angiosperms
- Clade: Eudicots
- Clade: Asterids
- Order: Apiales
- Family: Araliaceae
- Genus: Meryta
- Species: M. salicifolia

Binomial name
- Meryta salicifolia J.W.Moore (1940)

Species of plant

Meryta salicifolia is a species of flowering plant in the family Araliaceae. It is a tree endemic to the island of Tahiti in the Society Islands of French Polynesia.
