= Denham, Western Australia =

Denham
- Town
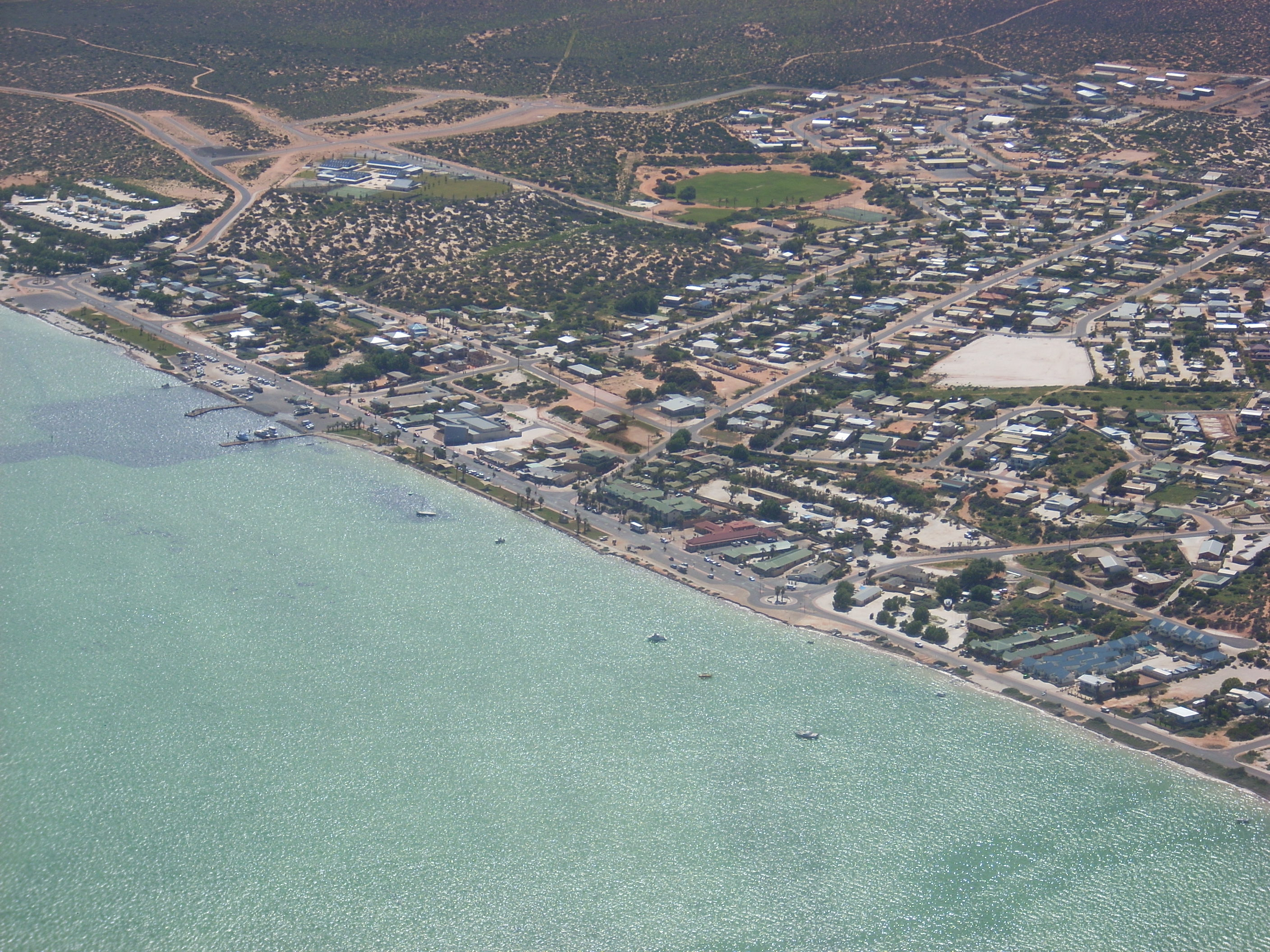
- Aerial view of Denham, 2009

- Interactive map of Denham
- Coordinates: 25°55′37″S 113°32′02″E
- Country: Australia
- State: Western Australia
- LGA: Shire of Shark Bay
- Location: 837 km (520 mi) NW of Perth; 409 km (254 mi) NW of Geraldton; 326 km (203 mi) S of Carnarvon (road)

Government
  - State electorate: North West
  - Federal division: Durack

Area
  - Total: 53.2 km^{2} (20.5 sq mi)
- Elevation: 9 m (30 ft)

Population
  - Total: 723 (UCL 2021)
- Postcode: 6537
- Mean max temp: 26.8 °C (80.2 °F)
- Mean min temp: 17.8 °C (64.0 °F)
- Annual rainfall: 223.3 mm (8.79 in)

Denham is the administrative town for the Shire of Shark Bay, Western Australia. Located on the western coast of the Peron Peninsula, 831 kilometres (516 mi) north of Perth, Denham is the westernmost publicly accessible town in Australia, and is named in honour of Captain Henry Mangles Denham of the Royal Navy, who charted Shark Bay in 1858.

Denham is the gateway for tourists who come to see the dolphins at Monkey Mia, which is 23 kilometres (14 mi) north-east of the town. The town also has an attractive beach and a jetty popular with those interested in fishing and boating. At the 2016 census, Denham had a population of 754.

The Denham region was the second area of the Australian mainland to be sighted by European sailors, after the western coast of Cape York Peninsula.

== History ==
Map of Shark Bay area

The indigenous inhabitants of Denham and the wider Shark Bay area are the Malgana people, whose occupation of the area dates back at least 30,000 years. Their traditional country is about 28,800 square kilometres in extent. In 2018, the Malgana people were formally recognised as native title holders of the area by the Federal Court of Australia, following a 20-year-long legal process.

On 25 October 1616, Dutch captain Dirk Hartog and crew, in the ship Eendracht, came unexpectedly upon "various islands, which were, however, found uninhabited." He made landfall on what is now called Dirk Hartog Island off the coast of Shark Bay. Hartog spent three days examining the coast and nearby islands. He called the area Eendrachtsland after his ship, but the name has not endured. Finding little of interest, Hartog continued sailing northwards to about 22° South, charting the previously unknown coast.

In 1697, Dutch captain Willem de Vlamingh, in charge of a small rescue fleet looking for possible survivors from the lost ship Ridderschap van Holland, landed on Dirk Hartog Island. Later European explorers included William Dampier, and, in the early 19th century, the Frenchmen Freycinet, Hamelin and Baudin.

The coast remained uninhabited by Europeans until the middle of the 19th century. The first pearls found in Western Australia were discovered in Shark Bay in 1854 by a Lieutenant Helpman, the so-called "Admiral of the Swan River Navy", who found the dense beds of pearl-shell oysters that are abundant there.

On 26 January 1952, 59 residents signed a petition to open an airport in the town, as it faced no coastal shipping services, no mail, and no medical services in the town. It was considered “the loneliest town in Australia”. Despite all of this, the town fell short of the 100 resident requirement for a proper airport to be in use, however in 1953, the Minister of Transport and Shipping promised the construction for one. In 1954, the town finally received its first airport, named the Shark Bay Aerodrome. It serviced south-bound Douglas DC-3 flights by MacRobertson Miller Airlines every Sunday. The earlier name to that of Denham was Freshwater Camp when it was a pearling camp.

== Population ==
In the 2016 Census, there were 754 people in Denham. 72.1% of people were born in Australia and 84.7% of people spoke only English at home. The most common responses for religion were No Religion 38.3%, Anglican 22.1% and Catholic 18.7%.

== Facilities ==
There is a crisis centre, two churches, a unit of the Red Cross, Returned Services League, plus the usual amenities, facilities and social organisations found in any small Australian rural town, such as grocery and hardware shops, a hairdressing salon, hotels, caravan parks, various types of holiday accommodation, butcher, and tourist and souvenir shops. There is also a restaurant called Old Pearler Restaurant. Social organisations include a bowls club, golf club, speedway, arts society, film club, pistol club, bridge club, crafts group, youth association and facilities for various sports such as netball, cricket and football.

There is no resident doctor, but a full-time nurse is in charge of the local Silver Chain Nursing post. Currently a medical practitioner flies in for two days once a week. Emergency services, such as Fire Brigade, Ambulance, State Emergency Service and Marine Rescue, are operated entirely by volunteers. Electricity is provided by a wind-diesel power plant. In 2020, Western Australia’s remote energy provider Horizon Power embarked on a ground-breaking hydrogen demonstration project to replace the diesel generators, with a trial commencing in late 2022.

== Tourism ==
The tourist industry – which functions mainly from April until September – results in an influx of over 250,000 people passing through the shire on the main North West Coastal Highway, of which approximately 110,000 go to Denham and Monkey Mia. The 150-kilometre (93 mi) stretch of road linking the highway with Denham is known as World Heritage Drive.

A number of tour operators have land- and water-based operations using both Monkey Mia and Denham as their base.

Ocean Park Aquarium is located 10 kilometres (6.2 mi) south of Denham, and has Western Australia's largest shark lagoon. It is one of the very few places in the country where tiger sharks can be seen, and the daily shark feedings are a major visitor drawcard.

== Transport ==
There is an all-weather airstrip, Monkey Mia Airport (also known as Shark Bay Airport). Regional Express Airlines operates regular services as the main tourist fly-in for Denham and Monkey Mia.

== Twinned Town ==
Denham is twinned with Denham, Buckinghamshire in the United Kingdom.

== Climate ==
Denham has a semi-arid climate typical of the Gascoyne. Summers are warm but, due to the coastal influence, are not as hot as areas further inland. The majority of Denham's rainfall occurs in winter due to cold fronts moving in from the Indian Ocean. However, the town receives far less rainfall from those systems than areas further south, such as Geraldton and Perth. The period from September to March is largely rainless, apart from erratic thunderstorms and the influence of occasional tropical cyclones.

Climate data for Denham
Month	Jan	Feb	Mar	Apr	May	Jun	Jul	Aug	Sep	Oct	Nov	Dec	Year
Record high °C (°F)	46.5 (115.7)	47.0 (116.6)	46.2 (115.2)	39.5 (103.1)	36.5 (97.7)	30.0 (86.0)	29.0 (84.2)	31.5 (88.7)	37.0 (98.6)	42.0 (107.6)	42.0 (107.6)	44.1 (111.4)	47.0 (116.6)
Mean daily maximum °C (°F)	30.7 (87.3)	31.9 (89.4)	31.1 (88.0)	28.6 (83.5)	25.7 (78.3)	22.9 (73.2)	21.7 (71.1)	22.5 (72.5)	23.9 (75.0)	25.7 (78.3)	27.7 (81.9)	29.2 (84.6)	26.8 (80.2)
Mean daily minimum °C (°F)	22.1 (71.8)	23.0 (73.4)	22.1 (71.8)	19.7 (67.5)	16.4 (61.5)	13.9 (57.0)	12.7 (54.9)	13.3 (55.9)	14.9 (58.8)	16.8 (62.2)	18.7 (65.7)	20.5 (68.9)	17.8 (64.0)
Record low °C (°F)	14.0 (57.2)	15.9 (60.6)	14.0 (57.2)	11.9 (53.4)	8.5 (47.3)	7.5 (45.5)	5.5 (41.9)	6.7 (44.1)	8.0 (46.4)	7.8 (46.0)	10.0 (50.0)	12.5 (54.5)	5.5 (41.9)
Average precipitation mm (inches)	7.6 (0.30)	15.4 (0.61)	14.9 (0.59)	13.7 (0.54)	36.5 (1.44)	54.4 (2.14)	39.6 (1.56)	21.9 (0.86)	8.1 (0.32)	6.0 (0.24)	3.0 (0.12)	2.3 (0.09)	223.3 (8.79)
Average precipitation days (≥ 0.2 mm)	1.0	1.4	1.5	2.1	4.9	7.0	7.1	5.6	2.9	1.9	0.9	0.5	36.8
Mean monthly sunshine hours	320	285	280	245	215	180	205	235	250	300	315	325	3,155
Percentage possible sunshine	77	79	75	71	64	56	61	67	70	75	78	77	71
Source: Bureau of Meteorology.

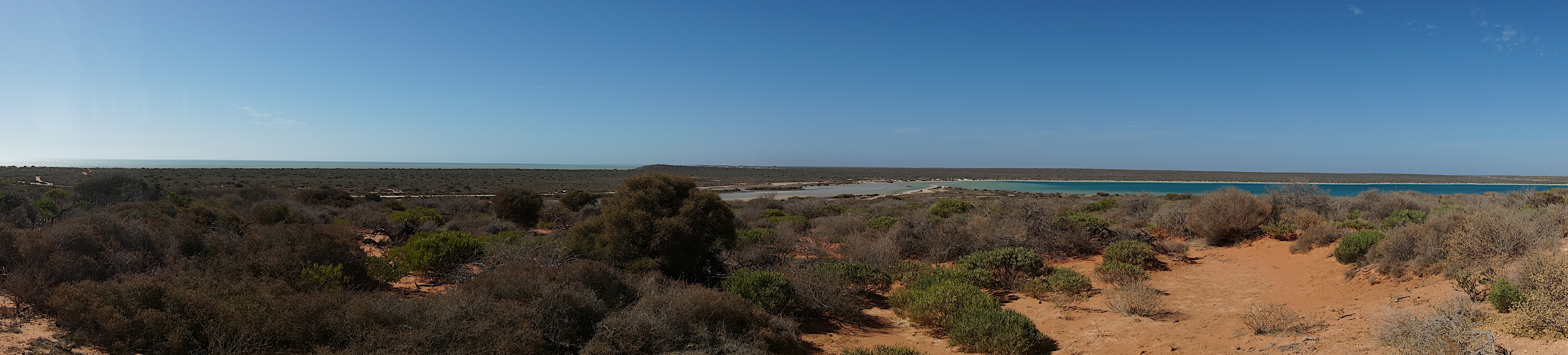
Little Lagoon at the north edge of Denham, 2014

== See also ==
- Henry Mangles Denham
