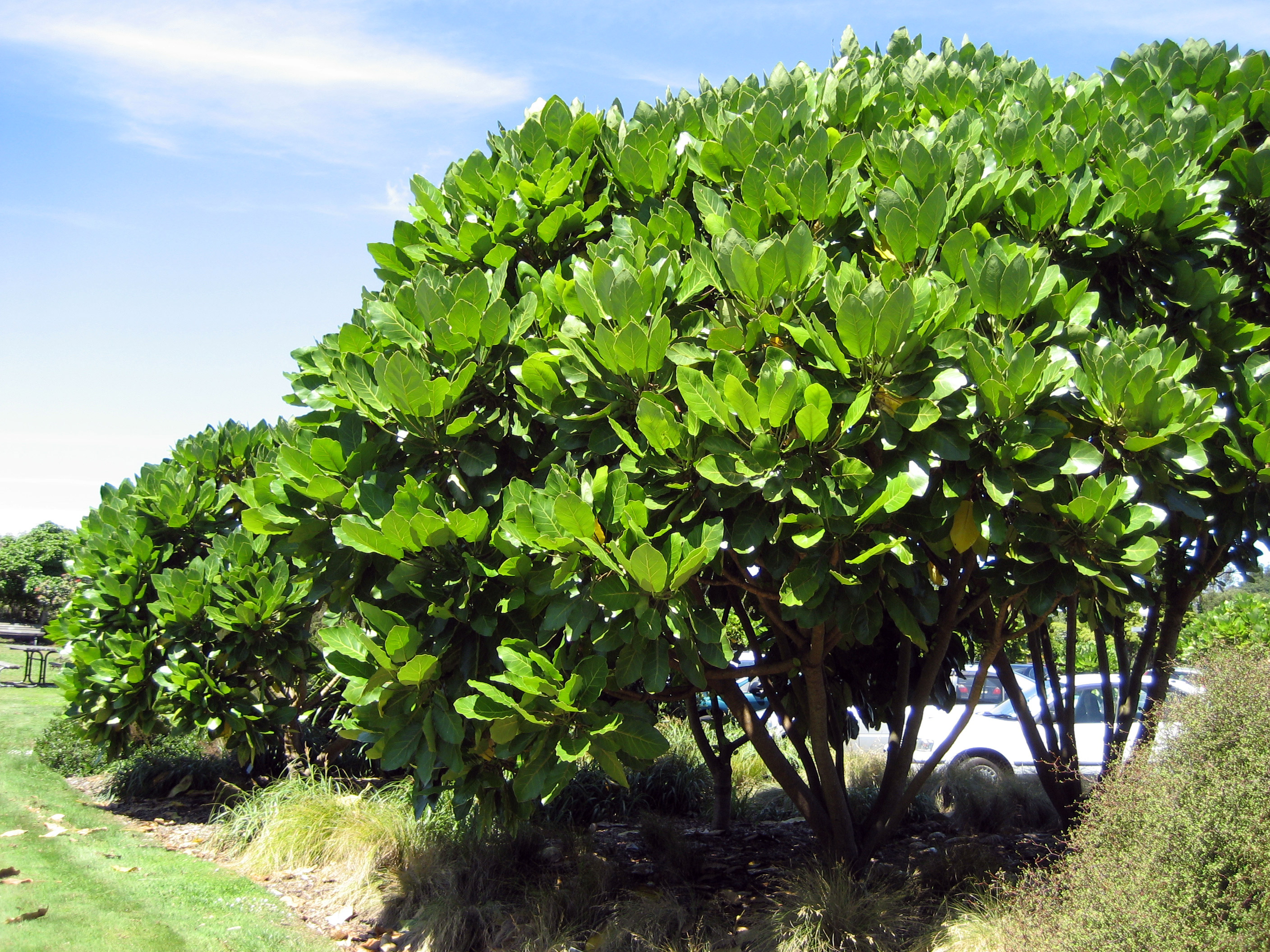
- Meryta sinclairii in Manukau City

Conservation status
- Vulnerable (IUCN 3.1)

Scientific classification
- Kingdom: Plantae
- Clade: Tracheophytes
- Clade: Angiosperms
- Clade: Eudicots
- Clade: Asterids
- Order: Apiales
- Family: Araliaceae
- Genus: Meryta
- Species: M. sinclairii

Binomial name
- Meryta sinclairii (Hook.f.) Seem.

= Meryta sinclairii =

Species of tree endemic to New Zealand

Meryta sinclairii, commonly known as the puka or pukanui, is a large-leafed evergreen tree endemic to New Zealand that grows to about 8 metres (26 feet) tall, with the distinctly tropical appearance typical of the genus. There are about 27 species of Meryta, all small, resinous trees of the subtropical and tropical Pacific Ocean.

Puka occurs naturally on the Three Kings Islands (c. 34°S, 172°W) and the Hen and Chickens Islands (c. 36°S, 175°W) where it occurs in greater abundance in the relatively sheltered valleys, where soils are thick and conditions are relatively moist, rather than on the exposed ridge-tops. However, puka can also grow on cliffs with shallow, stony soils which suggests some tolerance of drought.

== Description ==
The elliptical, thick, leathery leaves may be up to 50 cm long and 20 cm wide with a glossy upper surface. They are the largest entire leaves in the New Zealand flora. The petioles (leaf stalks) may be up to 35 cm long. The tree produces panicles of green-white flowers followed by black berries. The leaves are densely crowded, twenty to thirty together at the tips of the branches, with a few large deciduous scales amongst the petioles of the youngest.

When young, the puka grows straight up, but once it has flowered it tends to branch, typically forming a rounded crown. Puka's green-white flowers arise on erect terminal panicles up to 50 cm long from spring to autumn. The flowers are inconspicuous and ball-bearing sized fruit form only on the female plants (although occasionally bisexual flowers occur). The fruit is roundish-oblong, black, shining, slightly angled when young, becoming even as it approaches maturity; seeds 5, curved, much compressed, about three-eights of an inch in length, black, or dark-brown, intensely hard. Fruits take a year to mature, and as they begin to ripen to black, birds are attracted to them.

The entire plant is more or less resinous, and the dark-brown bark has numerous warty excrescences and is easily wounded, producing large callosities as it heals. The wood is white and brittle. The branches are very stout, showing the scars of fallen leaves. The trunk is stout or slender, irregularly and sparingly branched.

== Discovery ==
Puka first came to European attention when William Colenso found a single tree growing at the head of Whangaruru Bay in Northland (on the New Zealand mainland). This tree was protected by a fence, and declared sacred by Māori, who told Colenso that they had brought the tree from the Poor Knights Islands. Colenso made frequent visits to Whangaruru Bay over several years in the vain hope of procuring flowers and fruit. Colenso pointed out the tree to Dr Andrew Sinclair, (1794–1861), Colonial Secretary and naturalist, for whom the tree would eventually be named. Colenso and Sinclair sent specimens of the foliage to Kew. Later William Mair found the tree, and he eventually succeeded in procuring specimens of the leaves and fruit, which were forwarded to Dr Joseph Hooker at Kew. From these specimens the original description of the tree was made under the name Botryodendrum sinclairii.

== Cultivation ==
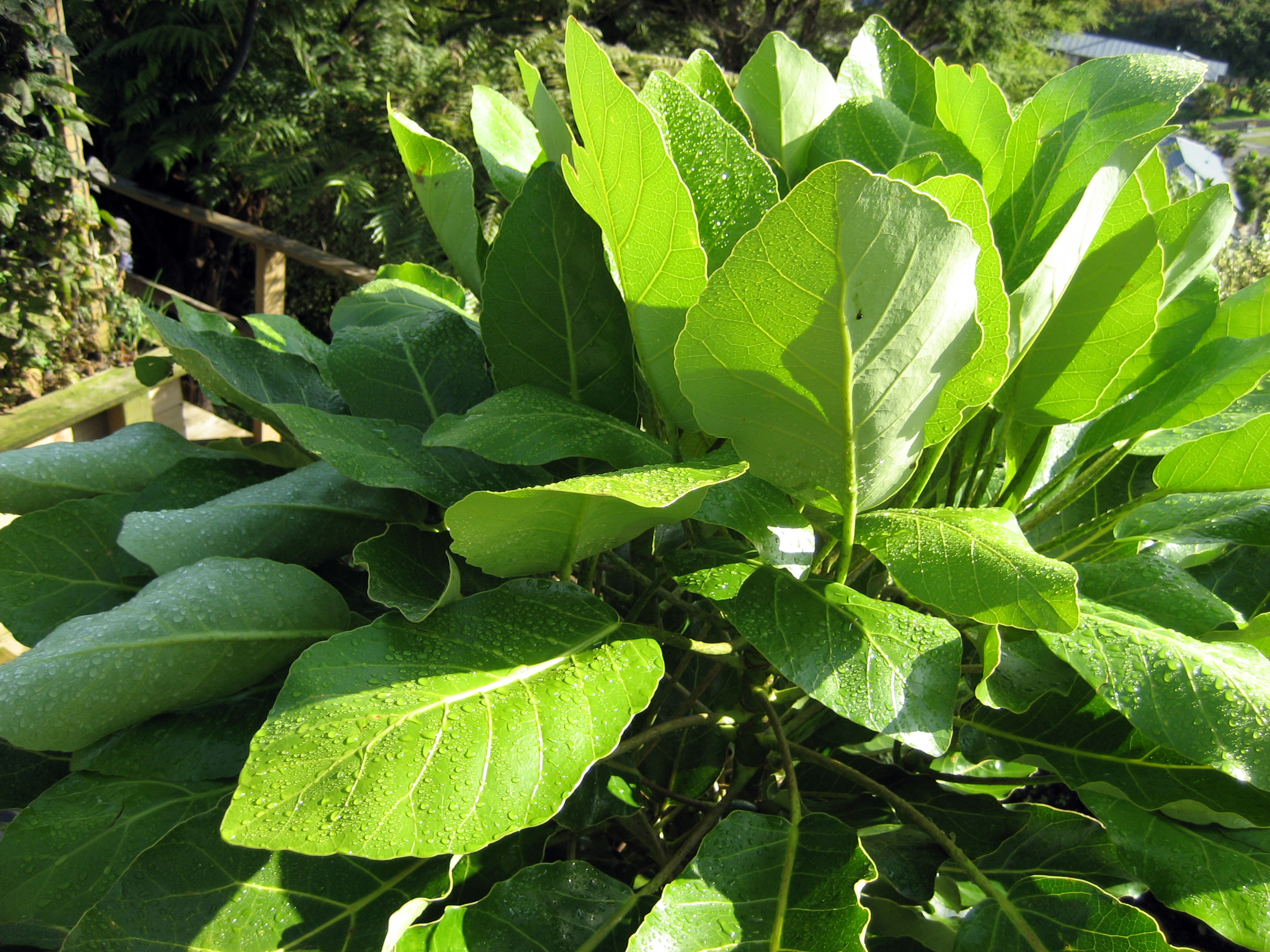
Leaves of a young Meryta sinclairii

Kirk recorded in 1869 that puka was 'already established under cultivation', and today it is widely grown as a street tree and a garden specimen in northern New Zealand. The main method of propagation is from seed although cuttings may be taken with limited success. Puka grows well in full sun or light shade and is intolerant of frost, especially when young – leaves will suffer damage if the temperature drops below −2 °C, although it has been grown as far south as Dunedin in protected situations. Puka is wind tolerant, and is unaffected by salt spray and highly tolerant of coastal conditions. Puka may be trimmed to contain its size and can be grown in large containers. It also makes an ideal indoor plant when young. Meryta sinclairii var. 'Moonlight' is a variegated form with very attractive cream and yellow leaves. It is not as vigorous or as easy to grow as the wild form.

== Bibliography ==
- New Zealand Plant Conservation Network, URL: Meryta sinclairii. Retrieved 2 June 2010.
- Flora of New Zealand, URL: Meryta. Retrieved 2 June 2010.
- Flora of New Zealand, URL: Meryta sinclairii. Retrieved 2 June 2010.
- P. Bannister, 'Winter frost resistance of leaves of some plants from the Three Kings Islands, grown outdoors in Dunedin, New Zealand' New Zealand Journal of Botany, 1984, Vol. 22 : 303–306. Retrieved 7 October 2010.
- F. M. Kelliher, M. B. Kirkham, J. E. Hunt, 'Photosynthesis and stomatal conductance of the New Zealand tree, Meryta sinclairii, grown under two watering regimes' New Zealand Journal of Botany, 2000, Vol. 38: 5 15–5 19. Retrieved 2 June 2010.
- T. Kirk, 1869. 'An account of the Puka (Meryta Sinclairii, Seem.)' Transactions and Proceedings of the Royal Society of New Zealand, Volume 2, 1869. pp. 100–101. URL: RSNZ. Retrieved 2 June 2010.
- Porter P. Lowry II, 'Notes on the Fijian Endemic Meryta Tenuifolia (Araliaceae)'. Annals of the Missouri Botanical Garden, Vol. 75, No. 1 (1988), pp. 389–391.
- John Salmon, The Native Trees of New Zealand. Wellington: Reed Books, 1999.
- Biography of Andrew Sinclair, from An Encyclopaedia of New Zealand, edited by A. H. McLintock, originally published in 1966. Te Ara – The Encyclopedia of New Zealand, updated 26 September 2006. URL: SINCLAIR, Andrew
