= Peron Peninsula =

Peninsula in Shark Bay in Western Australia

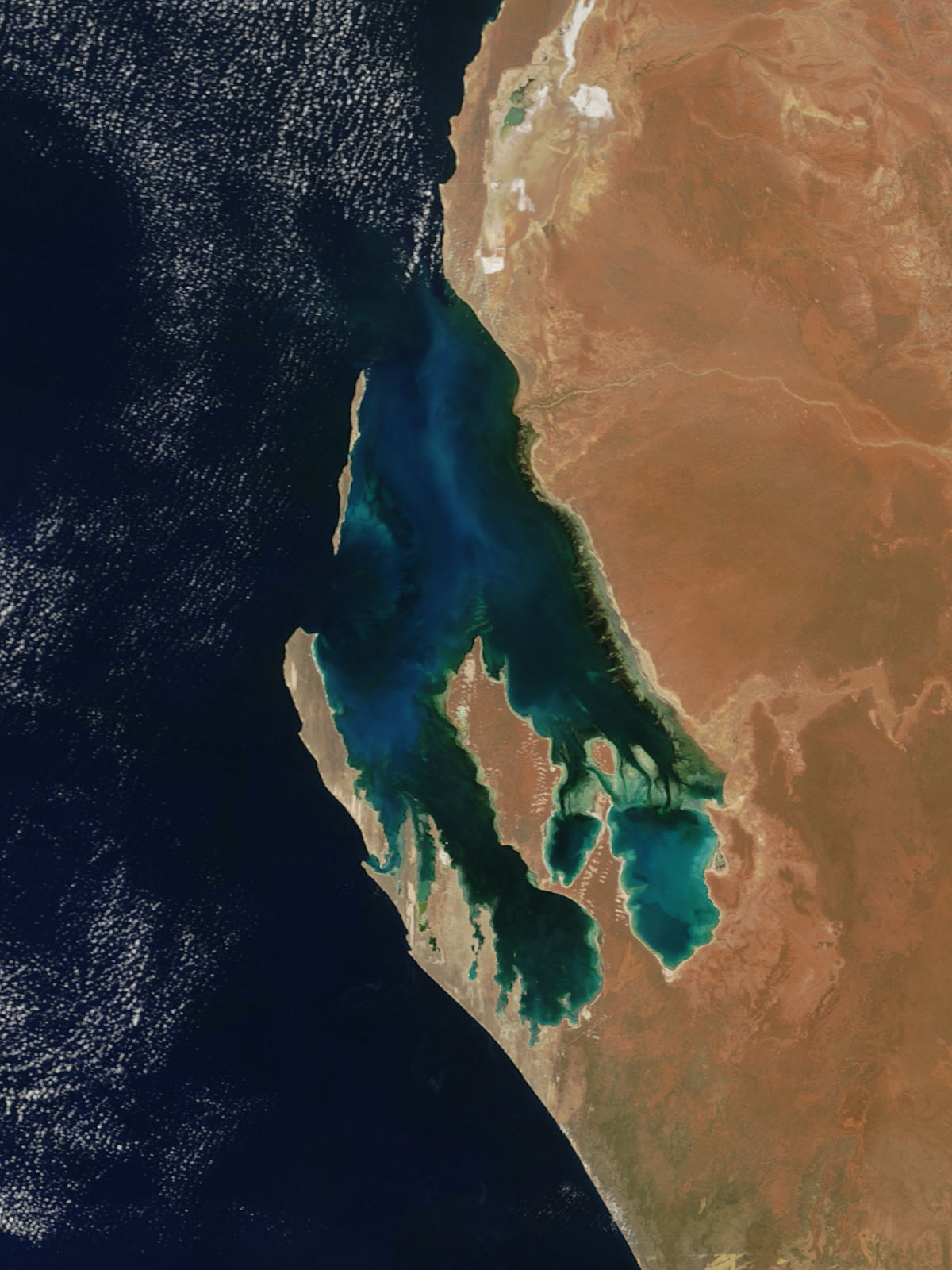
Satellite image of Shark Bay. The Peron Peninsula is in the centre.

Location in Western Australia

The Peron Peninsula (Malgana: Wulybidi) is a long narrow peninsula located in the Shark Bay World Heritage Site in Western Australia, at about 25°51′S 113°30′E. It is some 130 kilometres (81 mi) long, running north-northwesterly, located northeast of Henri Freycinet Harbour and west of Hamelin Pool and Faure Island. It is the largest of the Shark Bay peninsulas. Significant settlements include Denham and Monkey Mia. Shark Bay Airport is located there.

It is the location of former pastoral leases Peron and Nanga stations, and is the main location of land access to points within the World Heritage site. The northern area contains Francois Peron National Park. It is surrounded by the Shark Bay Marine Park and its lower southeast part is adjacent to the Hamelin Pool Marine Nature Reserve.

The Taillefer Isthmus, the narrowest section of the peninsula, is between Nanga and Goulet Bluff – which has Shell Beach located on the eastern side which lies in the L'Haridon Bight. The northernmost point is Cape Peron, which is a namesake of Cape Peron in the metropolitan Perth coastal area.

== History ==
The peninsula is named for French naturalist François Péron, who visited the area with the Géographe expeditions of 1801 and 1803. The peninsula was used as a sheep station from the late 1880s until being purchased by the national government in 1990. In 1919 Peron Peninsula Station had a total area of 106,000 hectares (263,000 acres) divided into 25 paddocks and was stocked with 12,000 sheep.

=== Peron Homestead Artesian Bore ===
The Peron Historical Homestead is near Denham.

It includes a visitor center. Peron Peninsula is part of the Carnarvon Basin, a geological structure lacking permanent fresh surface water. During the 1900s artesian bores were sunk to provide a greater quantity and quality of water. The resulting water comes up hot (35–60 °C or 95–140 °F) and has high salt and mineral content.
