= Faure Island =

Island in Shark Bay, Western Australia

Coordinates: 25°52′S 113°53′E

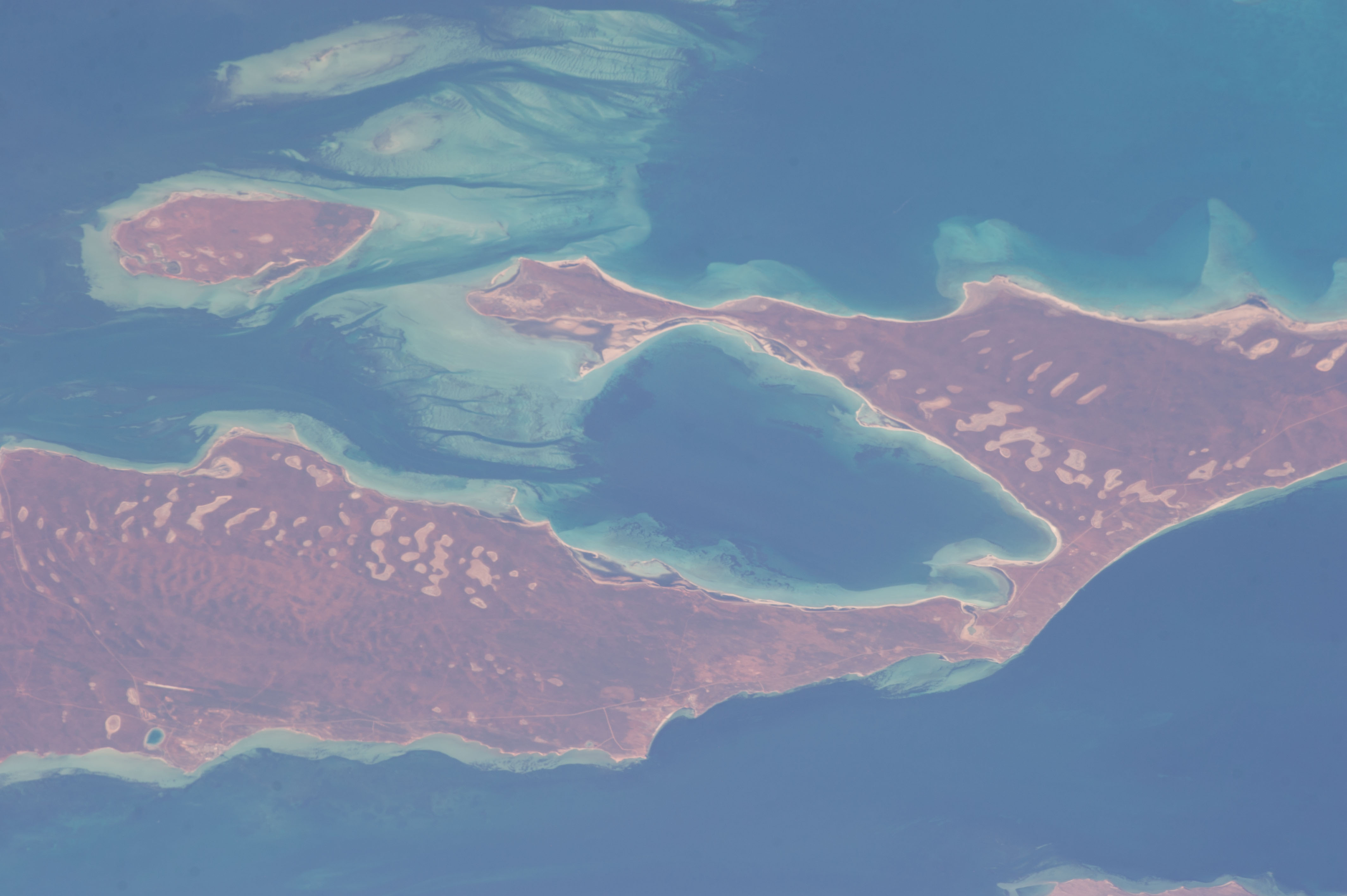
Faure Island (top left)

Location of Faure Island

Faure Island is a 58 km^{2} island pastoral lease and nature reserve, east of Francois Peron National Park on the Peron Peninsula, in Shark Bay, Western Australia. It lies in line with the Monkey Mia resort to the west, and the Wooramel River on the eastern shore of Shark Bay. It is surrounded by the Shark Bay Marine Park and Shark Bay World Heritage Site and, as the Faure Island Sanctuary, is owned and managed by the Australian Wildlife Conservancy (AWC).

== History ==
The island was given its European name by French explorer Nicolas Baudin in 1801, in honour of the geographer, Pierre Faure, aboard his ship Le Naturaliste.

Pastoral leases over the island were granted to Charles Broadhurst in 1873, and to WD Moore & Coy in 1883. For most of the 20th century, from 1905, the Hoult family of Denham ran sheep and goats on the island. In 1999 the Hoults sold the lease to the AWC, which removed more than 3400 sheep.

== Landscape and climate ==
The landscape consists mostly of red and white sandy plains and dunes, with claypans in low-lying areas. The highest point is 26m above sea level. It has some limestone and red sand cliff shores, like Peron Peninsula.

The vegetation is predominantly low shrubs of Acacia ramulosa. There are also mallee shrublands, spinifex grasslands, samphire/Atriplex shrublands, and coastal mangroves.

The climate is semi-arid to arid, with hot dry summers and mild winters. Rainfall is erratic, falling mainly in winter, with an annual average of 222 mm. Cyclones may sometimes bring rainfall in summer and autumn.

== Wildlife ==
=== Birds ===
Faure Island is an important breeding area for many seabirds, as well as being important for migratory waders using the East Asian - Australasian Flyway. With the neighbouring much smaller (5 ha) Pelican Island and their associated mudflats, it has been identified as a 5821 ha Important Bird Area (IBA). The Faure and Pelican Islands (Shark Bay) IBA supports breeding colonies of fairy terns and over 1% of the world populations of red-necked stint and pied oystercatcher. Together with the nearby Quoin Bluff and Freycinet Island IBA, it supports more than 1% of the world population of pied cormorants.

=== Mammals ===
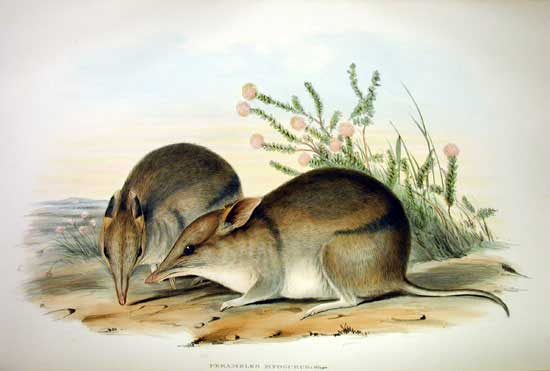
Western barred bandicoots have been reintroduced to the island.

The original native mammal fauna of Faure Island did not survive the introduction of livestock and the presence of feral cats. However, sub-fossil evidence of the former presence of native mammals has brought reintroduction of the boodie, Shark Bay mouse, banded hare-wallaby and western barred bandicoot. An attempt to reintroduce the greater stick-nest rat failed.

== Marine surrounds ==
The island is located within the Shark Bay Marine Park and is adjacent to both the Wooramel Seagrass Bank and the Faure Sill sandbank that is a major component in the creating of the conditions within the Hamelin Pool Marine Nature Reserve.

== See also ==
- List of islands of Western Australia
