= List of roadhouses in Western Australia =

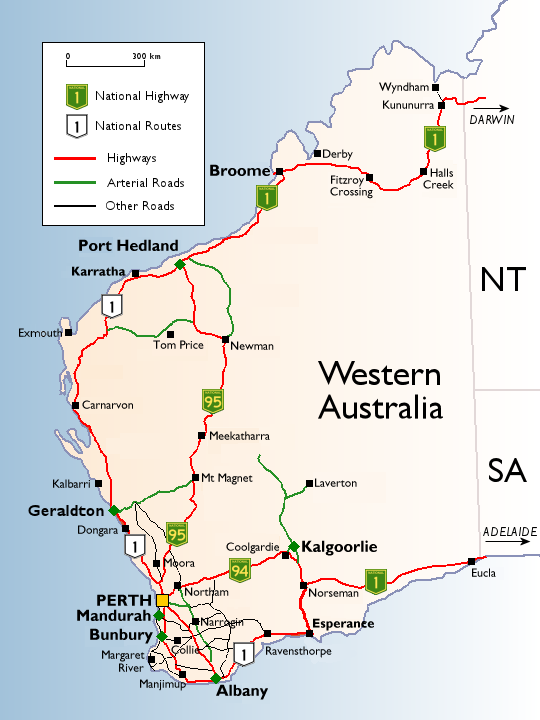
General highways map of Western Australia

Western Australia has extensive long-distance highways with few localities along them. Privately owned general stores known as roadhouses have been established at strategic points as an important utility for petrol, food, accommodation, emergency facilities and general supplies. They are also useful reference points in any response to accidents, floods, crime and other emergencies.

North-western roadhouses are found next to river crossings or close to station homesteads. In the event of flooding of the North West Coastal Highway, they are locations where vehicles including road trains can be safely encamped and accounted for when a sudden deluge may make the road impassable.

On the Nullarbor or Eyre Highway, places designated as roadhouses are in some cases also vested as localities and, in some cases, known as roadhouse communities.

The following list is of roadhouses that exist in isolation, having little or no adjacent community infrastructure. It does not include roadhouses which are in country towns.

== Roadhouses ==
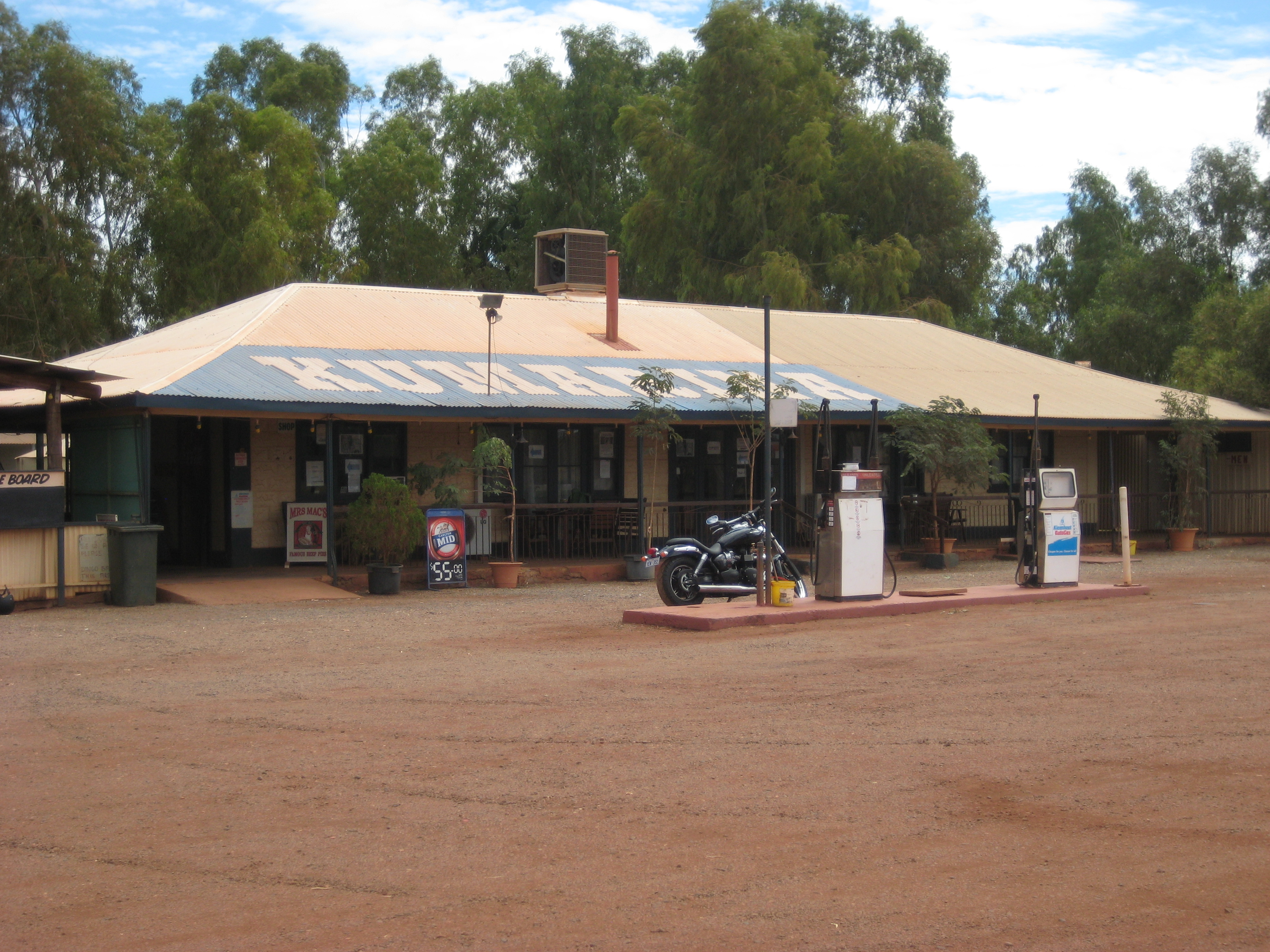
Kumarina Roadhouse, on the Great Northern Highway, north of Meekatharra

- Auski (Munjina)
- Balladonia
- Billabong
- Caiguna
- Capricorn
- Cue
- Cocklebiddy
- Doon Doon
- Eucla
- Fortescue River (21°17′44.32″S 116°08′17.52″E)
- Ilkurlka on the Anne Beadell Highway
- Kumarina Roadhouse
- Madura
- Minilya
- Mount Barnett
- Mundrabilla
- Murchison
- Nanutarra
- Overlander
- Pardoo
- Roebuck Plains Roadhouse
- Sandfire
- Tjukayirla on the Great Central Road
- Willare Bridge Roadhouse
- Wooramel

== Driver fatigue ==
Due to the high incidence of fatalities and accidents attributed to driver fatigue, some locations have opted into a program of providing free coffee to encourage drivers to take a break or rest on long journeys; in some cases some of the roadhouses above have become involved in that programme.

== See also ==
- List of highways in Western Australia
- List of roadhouses in the Northern Territory
- List of roadhouses in Australia
