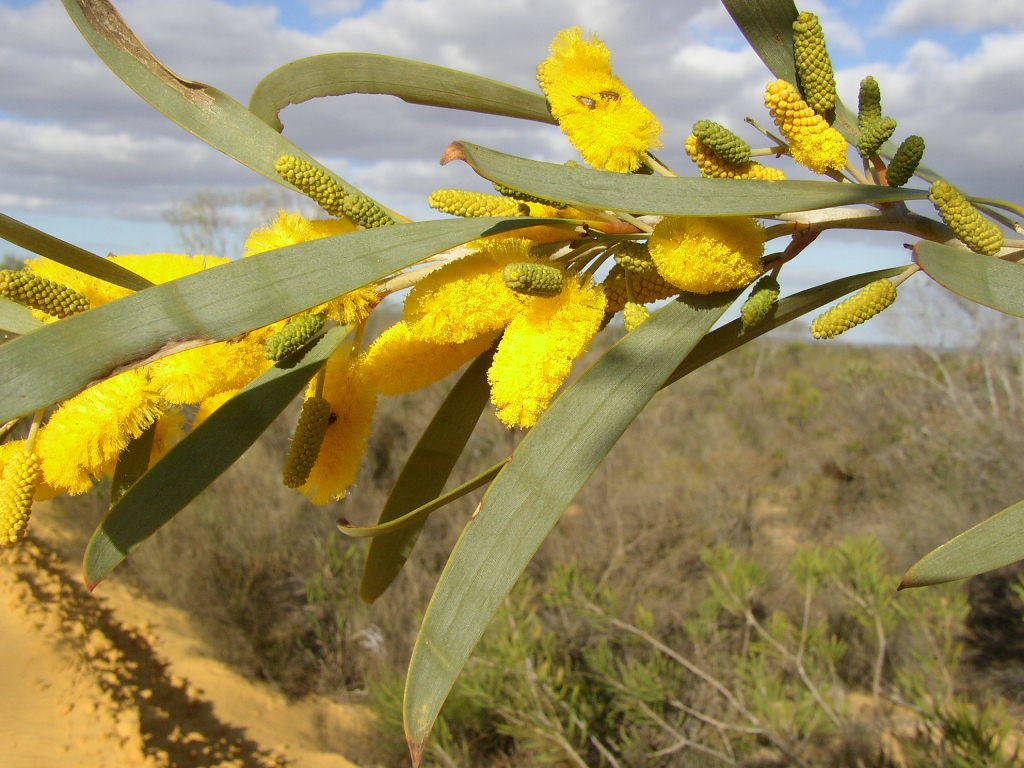

Scientific classification
- Kingdom: Plantae
- Clade: Tracheophytes
- Clade: Angiosperms
- Clade: Eudicots
- Clade: Rosids
- Order: Fabales
- Family: Fabaceae
- Subfamily: Caesalpinioideae
- Clade: Mimosoid clade
- Genus: Acacia
- Subgenus: Acacia subg. Juliflorae
- Species: A. signata

Binomial name
- Acacia signata F.Muell.
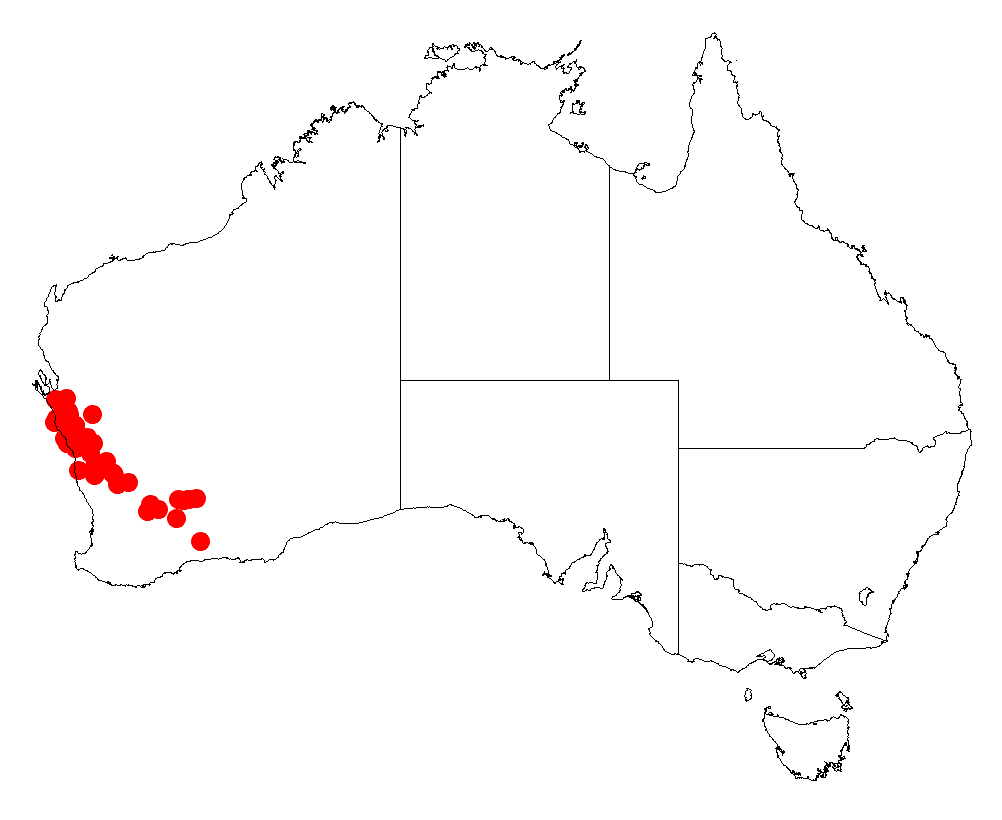
- Occurrence data from AVH

= Acacia signata =

Species of legume

Acacia signata is a species of tree or shrub in the family Fabaceae that is endemic to western Australia.

== Description ==
The slender, straggly, weeping tree or shrub typically grows to a height of 1 to 4 metres (3 to 13 ft). The pendulous or arching branchlets are often covered in a fine white powder. Like most species of Acacia it has phyllodes rather than true leaves. The evergreen phyllodes usually have a pendulous forn with a linear to linear-elliptic shape and are straight to slightly curved. The grey-green and coriaceous phyllodes have a length of 10 to 20 cm (3.9 to 7.9 in) and a width of 4 to 10 mm (0.16 to 0.39 in) and have numerous fine nerves numerous and a prominent yellow coloured pulvinus. It blooms from August to October producing yellow flowers. The inflorescences occur in groups of one to four flower-spikes with a cylindrical shape. The spikes have a length of 12 to 23 mm (0.47 to 0.91 in) and a diameter of 6 to 7.5 mm (0.24 to 0.30 in). The coriaceous seed pods that form after flowering have a curved to linear shape and are raised over seeds. The pods have a length of up to 7 cm (2.8 in) and have a width of 5 to 6 mm (0.20 to 0.24 in) and are glabrous with a powdery white coating. The glossy dark brown seeds inside are arranged longitudinally and have a compressed subdiscoid shape with a length of 4 to 4.5 mm (0.16 to 0.18 in).

== Taxonomy ==
The species was first formally described in 1863 by the botanist Ferdinand von Mueller as published in the work Fragmenta Phytographiae Australiae.

== Distribution ==
It is native to an area in the Mid West and north western Wheatbelt region of Western Australia where it is often situated on sandplains growing in sandy soils as a part of in heath, scrub and shrubland communities. It is found around Hamelin Pool in the north to around Cockleshell Gully in the south and as far east as Wubin but is not commonly occurring.

== See also ==
- List of Acacia species
