= L'Haridon Bight =

Bay in Western Australia

Coordinates: 26°05′S 113°47′E

L'Haridon Bight is one of the bays on the eastern side of the Peron Peninsula in the Shark Bay World Heritage Site in the Gascoyne region of Western Australia.

At its southern end lies Shell Beach, which is part of the very narrow Taillefer Isthmus that leads to the Peron Peninsula to the north. Its mouth at the north is just south west of Faure Island, where two points define its northern reach – Petit Point in the eastern part, and Dubaut Point to the west on the Peron Peninsula. It is one of locations in the Shark Bay where the water is hypersaline, and is also where a marine reserve exists.

== See also ==
- Hamelin Pool Marine Nature Reserve
