= Francois Peron National Park =

National park in Western Australia

- IUCN category II (national park)
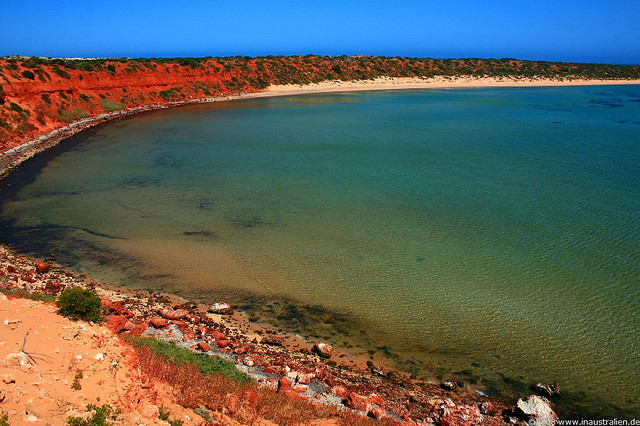

- Location within Western Australia
- Location: Western Australia
- Nearest city: Geraldton, Western Australia
- Coordinates: 25°41′58″S 113°33′07″E
- Area: 525.87 km^{2} (203.04 sq mi)
- Established: 1993
- Governing body: Department of Biodiversity, Conservation and Attractions
- Website: Official website

Francois Peron National Park is a national park on the Peron Peninsula in Western Australia, 726 kilometres (451 mi) north of Perth, and located within the boundary of the Shark Bay World Heritage area. The nearest towns to the park are Denham, which is found on the southern edge of the park and Carnarvon which is found about 80 kilometres (50 mi) to the north.

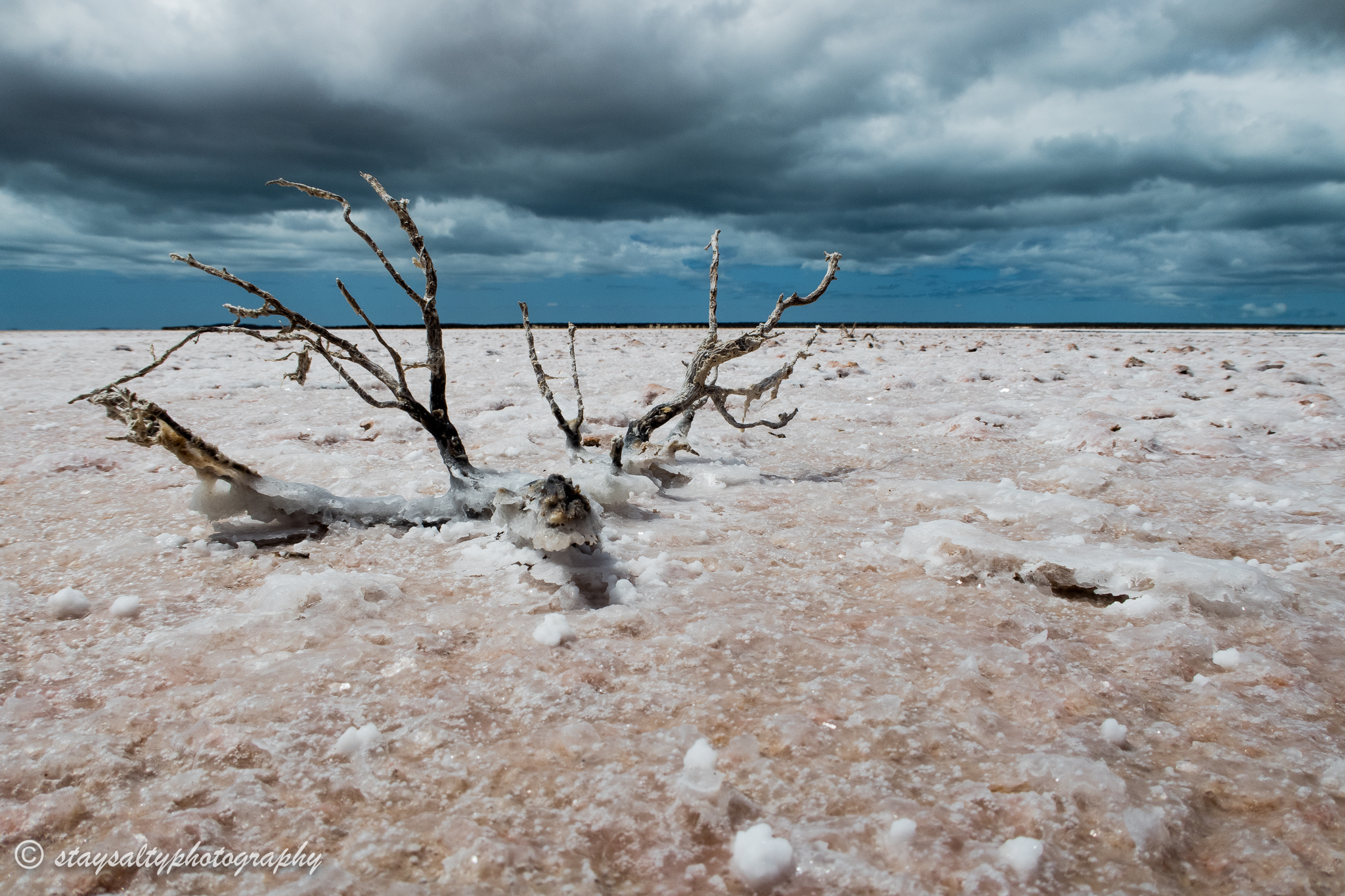
A salt encrusted branch on a super saline "birrida" in Francois Peron National Park

There is also an eponymous locality of the Shire of Shark Bay, but the boundaries of the national park and the locality are not identical.

== Names and earlier uses ==
Aboriginal Australians are the initial inhabitants of the area and have been living in it for over 26,000 years. The local peoples, who speak the Malgana language, call the area Wulyibidi.

It is named after the French naturalist and explorer François Péron who was the zoologist aboard Nicolas Baudin's 1801 and 1803 scientific expeditions to Western Australia, and is situated within the bounds of the earlier pastoral lease of the Peron Station.

Locations from the French exploration era include:

- Guichenault (east coast of the Peron Peninsula)
- Cape Lesueur (west coast of the Peron Peninsula)
- Lake Montbazin

A pearling camp was established on the peninsula at Herald Bight in the 1880s and the remains of shells can still be found along the beach.

Used as a sheep station from the early 1900s onwards the station was sold to the state government in 1990.

It was gazetted on 8 January 1993 as a National Park – through the purchase of Peron Station (Pastoral Lease 3114/761) in 1990.

== Location ==
It is adjacent to and surrounded by the Shark Bay Marine Park to the west, north and east, and by the Denham to Monkey Mia road to the south.

== Facilities ==
Picnic, boat launching and camping areas along the west coast of the Peninsula include:

- Big Lagoon
- Cape Lesueur
- Cattle Well
- South Gregories
- Gregories
- Bottle Bay

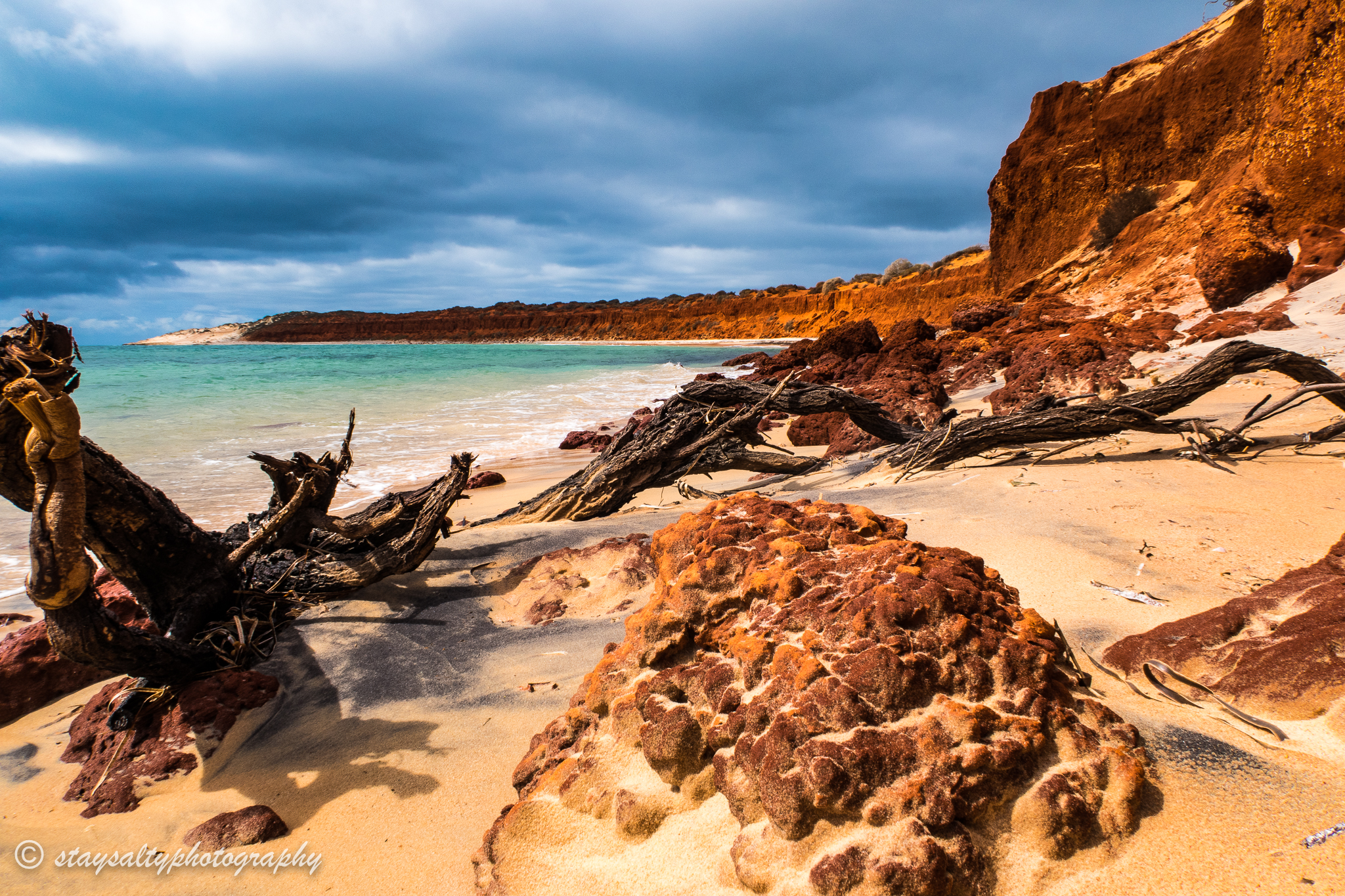
Red cliffs at Bottle Bay

== See also ==
- List of protected areas of Western Australia
- Denham, Western Australia
- Monkey Mia
