= Goulet Bluff =

Geological formation in Western Australia

Coordinates: 26°12′58″S 113°41′20″E

Goulet Bluff is a point on the western side of the Peron Peninsula in the Shark Bay World Heritage Site that acts as an important marker between the Denham Sound or northern portion of the Western Gulf Zone from the southern fishing zone of Freycinet Estuary. A 1,400-metre (4,593 ft) beach is located to the north side of the bluff. Waves usually maintain a migrating spit at the southern end of the each forming a narrow lagoon. The area is located 36 kilometres (22 mi) south east of Denham and provides four campsites for visitors.
