= Overlander Roadhouse =

Filling station in Western Australia

Coordinates: 26°24′41″S 114°27′51″E

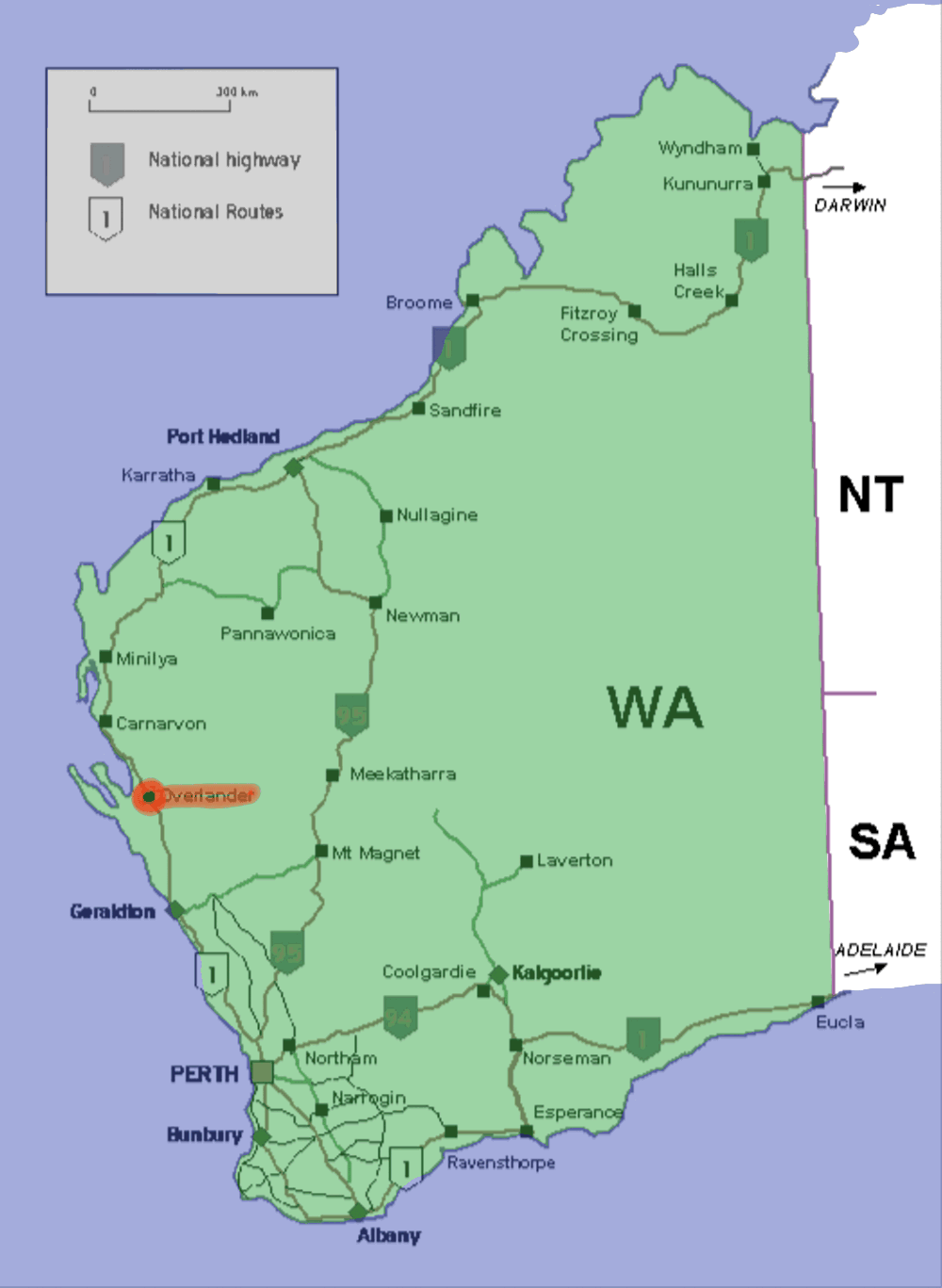
Location of Overlander in Western Australia (red)

The Overlander Roadhouse is a petrol service station in Western Australia, between Geraldton and Carnarvon on the North West Coastal Highway.

Its remoteness has led to the area around it being known as Overlander, though there is no such official locality. Due to the isolation, nearby station owners and workers have referred to it in their recounting station life in the area in the Shark Bay Pastoral Industry Oral History Project.

It is on the only road-access point to the Shark Bay World Heritage Area, and is the closest service location to the Hamelin Pool Marine Nature Reserve. The road linking the roadhouse with Shark Bay is known as World Heritage Drive.

== See also ==
- List of roadhouses in Western Australia
