= Shell Beach (Western Australia) =

Beach in Western Australia

Coordinates: 26.21081°S 113.76428°E

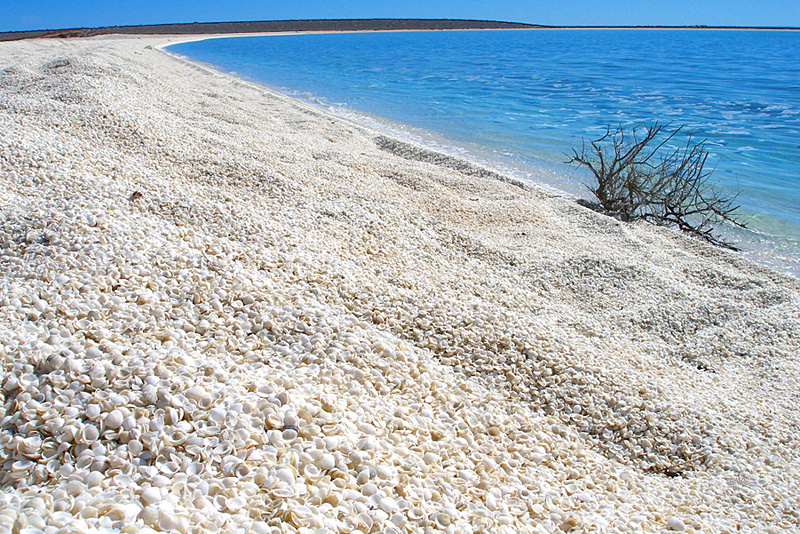
Shell Beach and Shark Bay

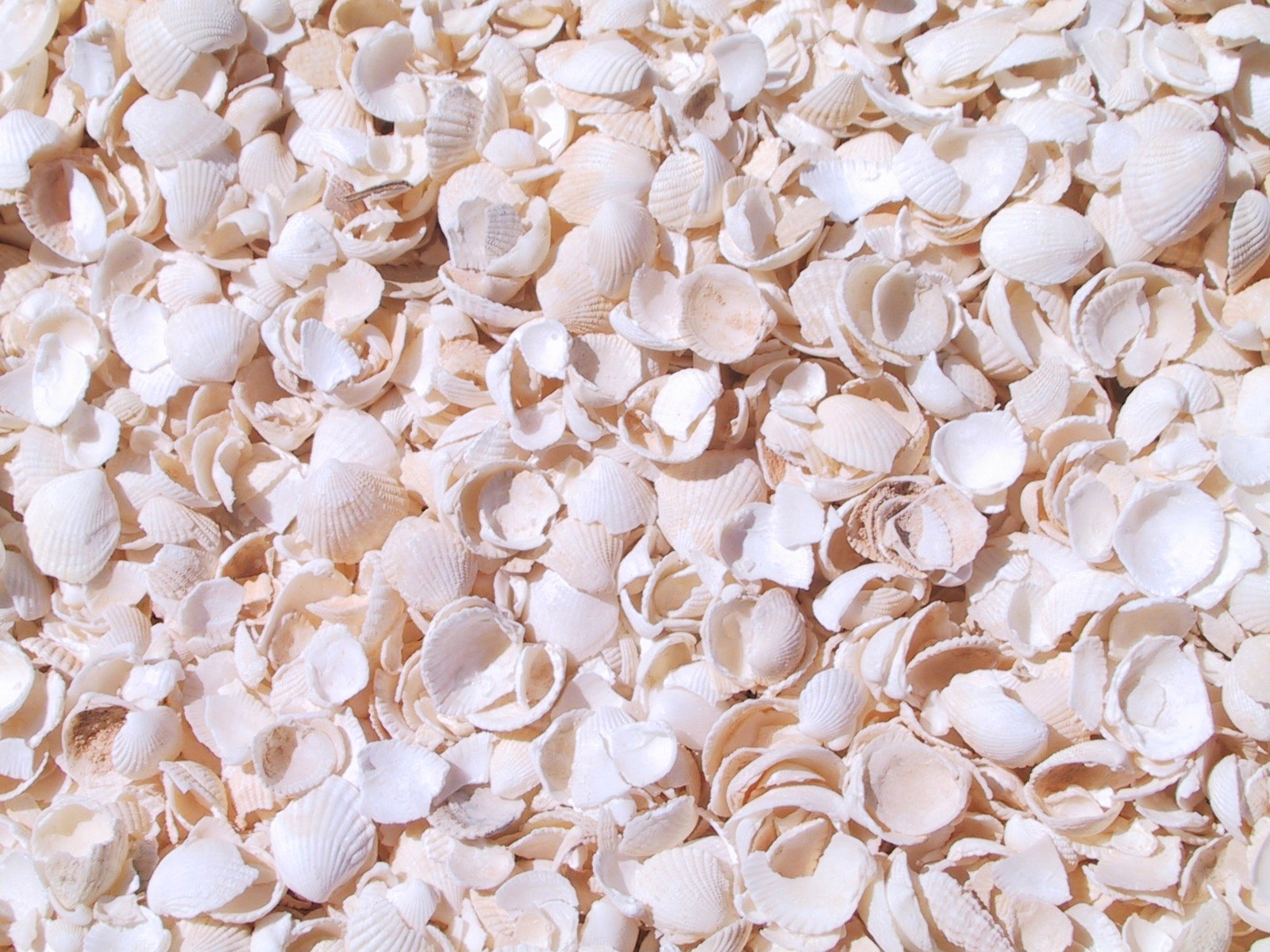
The cockle shells of Shell Beach

Shell Beach is a beach in the Shark Bay region of Western Australia, located 45 kilometres (28 mi) south-east of Denham.

Situated on the northeastern side of the Taillefer Isthmus along the L'Haridon Bight, the beach is covered with shells for a 60-kilometre (37 mi) stretch to a depth of 7–10 metres (23–33 ft). It is one of only two beaches in the world made entirely from shells.

The beach was named Shell Beach because of the great abundance of the shells of the cockle species Fragum erugatum. The seawater in the L'Haridon Bight has a high salinity due to both the geomorphology and local climate of the area. This high salinity has allowed the cockle to proliferate unchecked, since its natural predators have not adapted well to this environment.

The shells have formed a limestone that is known as coquina. Before Shark Bay became a World Heritage Site, the coquina was mined and used for the construction of a number of buildings in Denham.

== Additional information ==
- UNESCO World Heritage Centre: Shark Bay, Western Australia
