= Shark Bay Marine Park =

Marine protected area in Western Australia

- IUCN category VI (protected area with sustainable use of natural resources)
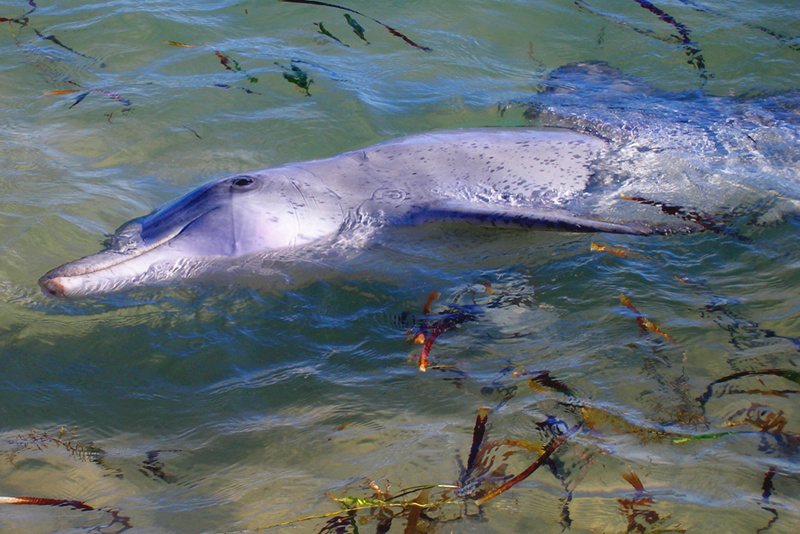
- A dolphin at Monkey Mia in the marine park

- Location within Western Australia
- Location: Western Australia
- Nearest city: Denham
- Coordinates: 25°48′S 113°45′E
- Area: 7,487.25 km^{2} (2,890.84 sq mi)
- Established: 30 November 1990
- Governing body: Department of Biodiversity, Conservation and Attractions
- Website: Official website

The Shark Bay Marine Park is a protected marine park located within the UNESCO World Heritage–listed Shark Bay, in the Gascoyne region of Western Australia. The 748,725-hectare (1,850,140-acre) marine park is situated over 800 kilometres (500 mi) north of Perth and 400 kilometres (250 mi) north of Geraldton.

The marine park is known for its large marine animals, such as the famous Monkey Mia dolphins, turtles, dugongs and sharks. The park and its vast seagrass meadows, with a total of twelve species of seagrass in the park, form an important part of the Shark Bay World Heritage Area.

Major reference points of its boundaries include Steep Point at the south side of Dirk Hartog Island and Cape Inscription at the north side.

== Fishing ==
Fishing in the marine park is governed by the Gascoyne Fishing Rules that specify the waters and species of the Shark Bay area, also known as the Shark Bay Inner Gulfs:

- Eastern Gulf Zone: the region located east of the Peron Peninsula and north from Cape Peron North (25°30.2′S 113°30.6′E to a line at 25°16.6'S) and east to the coast of the mainland. Fishing is not permitted in the southern portion of this zone, the Hamelin Pool Marine Nature Reserve.
- Denham Sound: the region also known as the Western Gulf Zone, south to line at Goulet Bluff (25°13’S) which separates the Freycinet Estuary.

== See also ==
- Protected areas of Western Australia
- Australian marine parks
