= Taillefer Isthmus =

Isthmus in Western Australia

Coordinates: 26.2167°S 113.7500°E

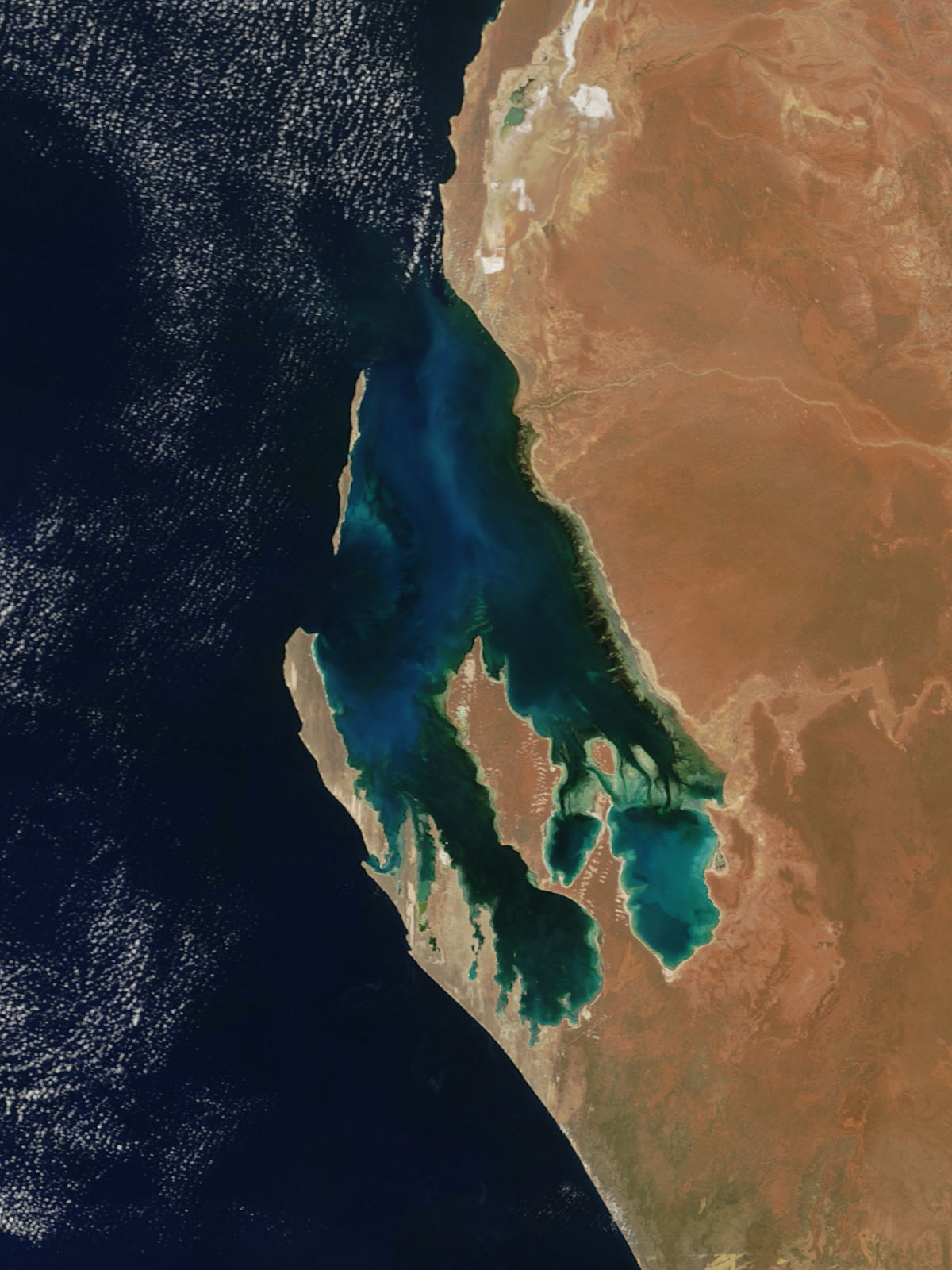
Satellite image of Shark Bay. The Peron Peninsula is in the centre, with the Taillefer Isthmus in its middle.

The Taillefer Isthmus (French: Isthme Taillefer) is an Australian isthmus on the Peron Peninsula on the coast of Western Australia in the Gascoyne region. Its western coast is formed by Henri Freycinet Harbour, its eastern one by L'Haridon Bight, both bodies of waters being part of Shark Bay.

The isthmus is named after Hubert Jules Taillefer, a French physician who took part in the Baudin expedition to Australia. It was later traversed by Augustus Charles Gregory.

A fence runs along the isthmus, creating a 100,000 hectare feral-free area to the northwest for native wildlife species to be re-introduced.
