= Hamelin Pool Marine Nature Reserve =

Protected area in Western Australia

- IUCN category Ia (strict nature reserve)
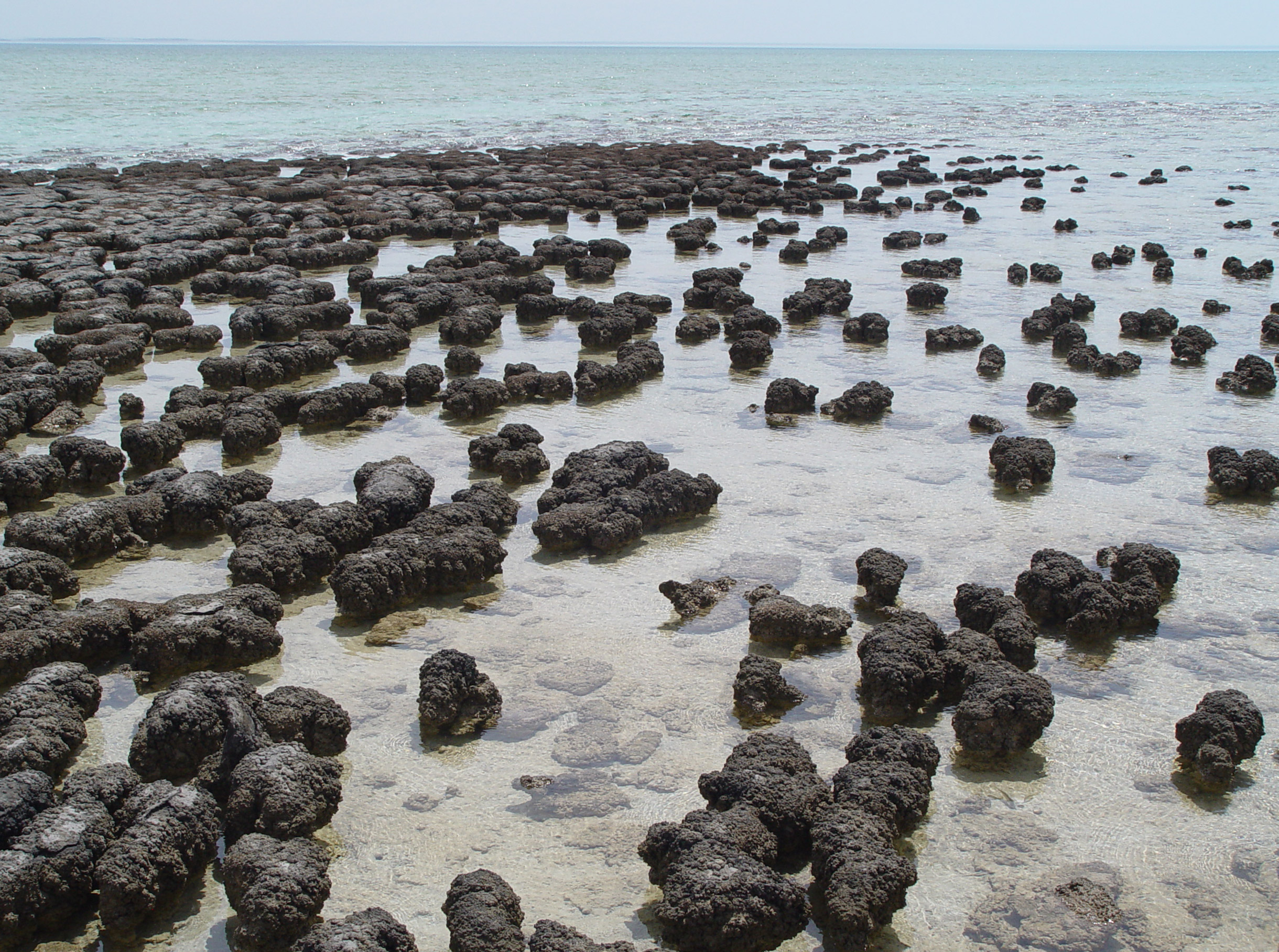
- Modern stromatolites in Hamelin Pool, Shark Bay, Western Australia

- Location within Western Australia
- Location: Western Australia
- Nearest city: Denham
- Coordinates: 26°26′28″S 114°20′58″E
- Area: 1,270 km^{2} (490 sq mi)
- Governing body: WA Department of Parks and Wildlife
- Website: Official website

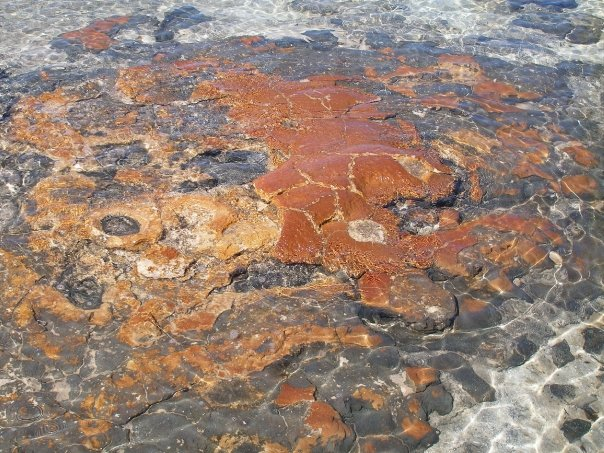
Hamelin Pool stromatolites

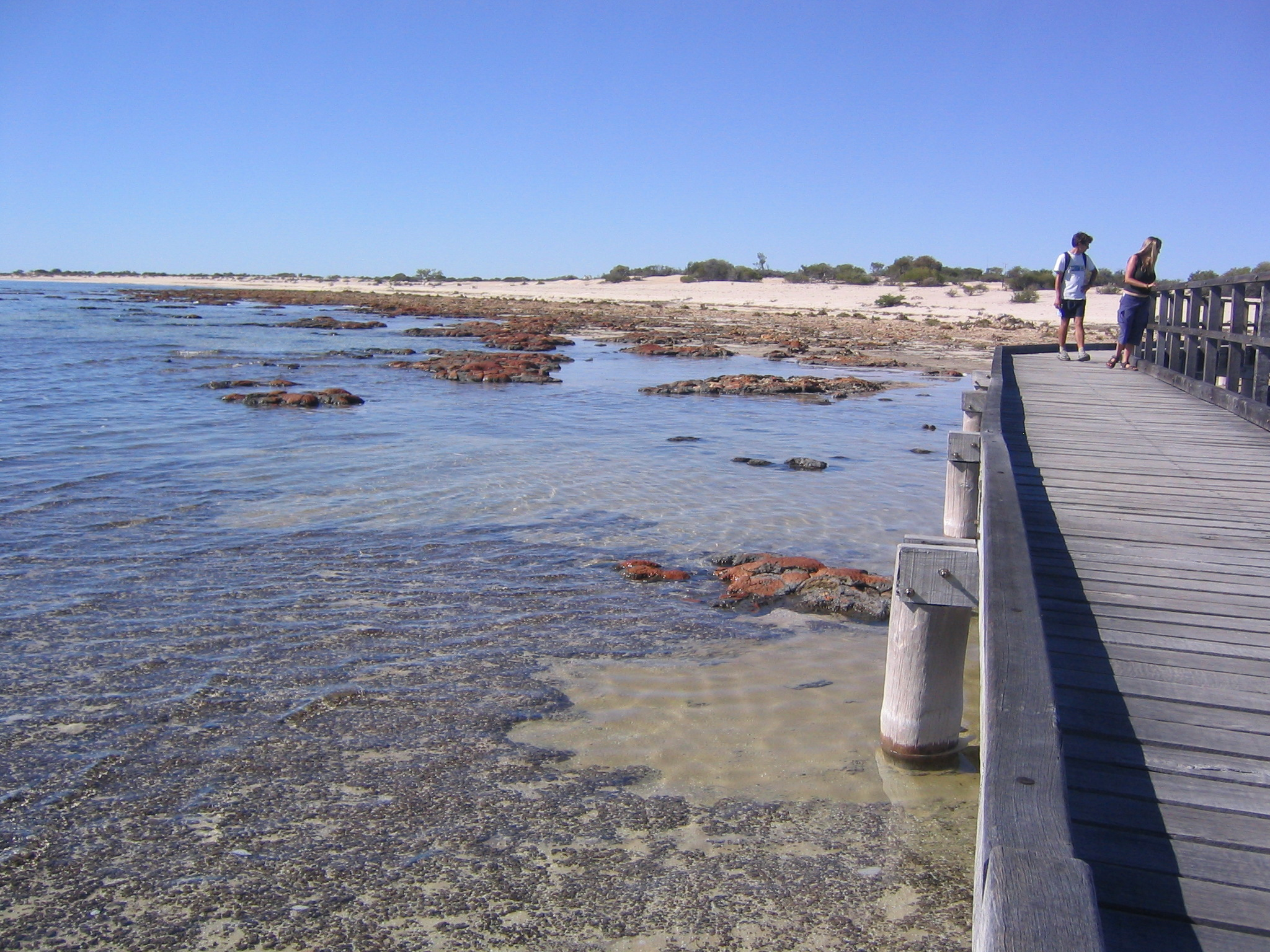
Walkway around Hamelin Pool

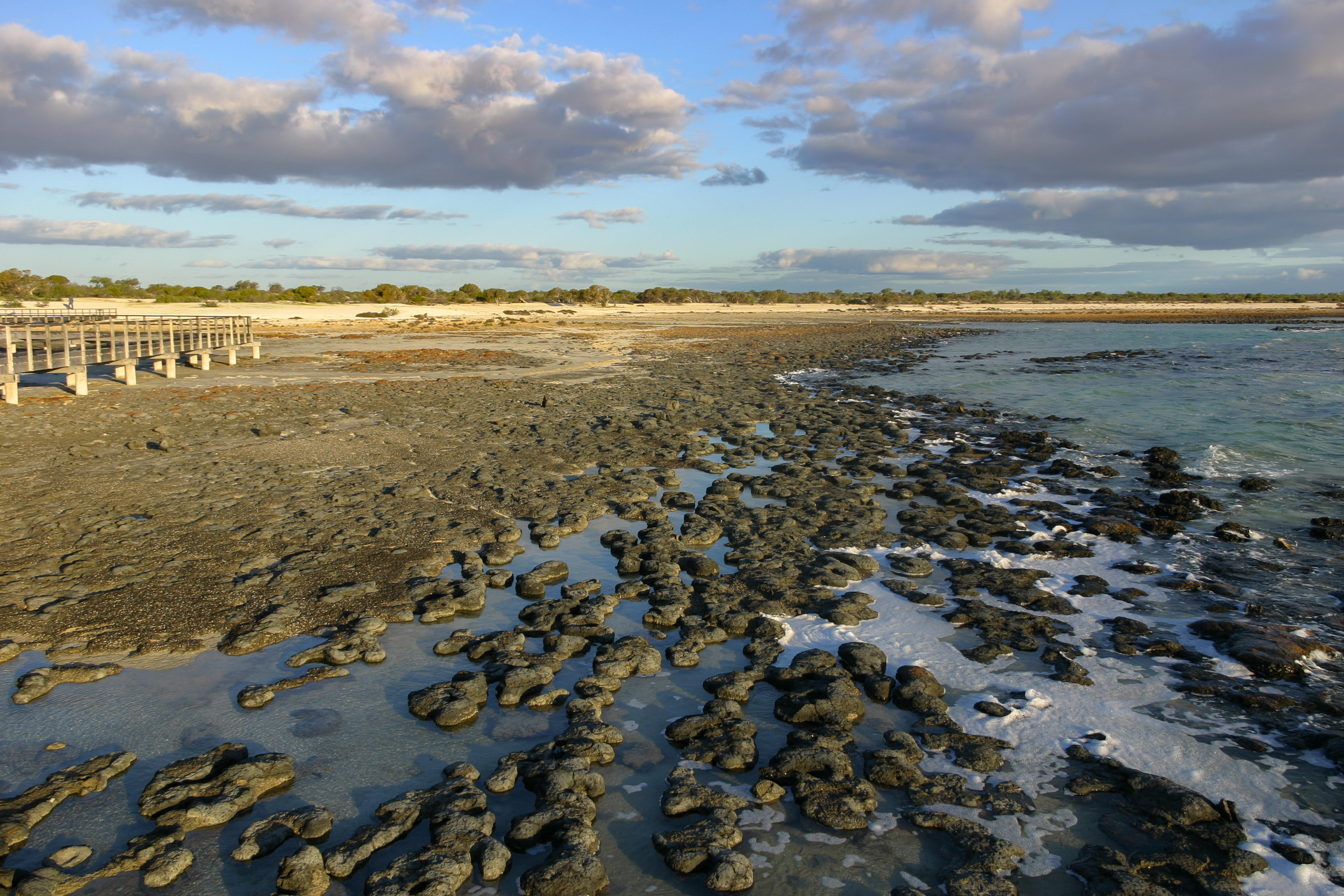
Hamelin Pool Stromatolites at low tide

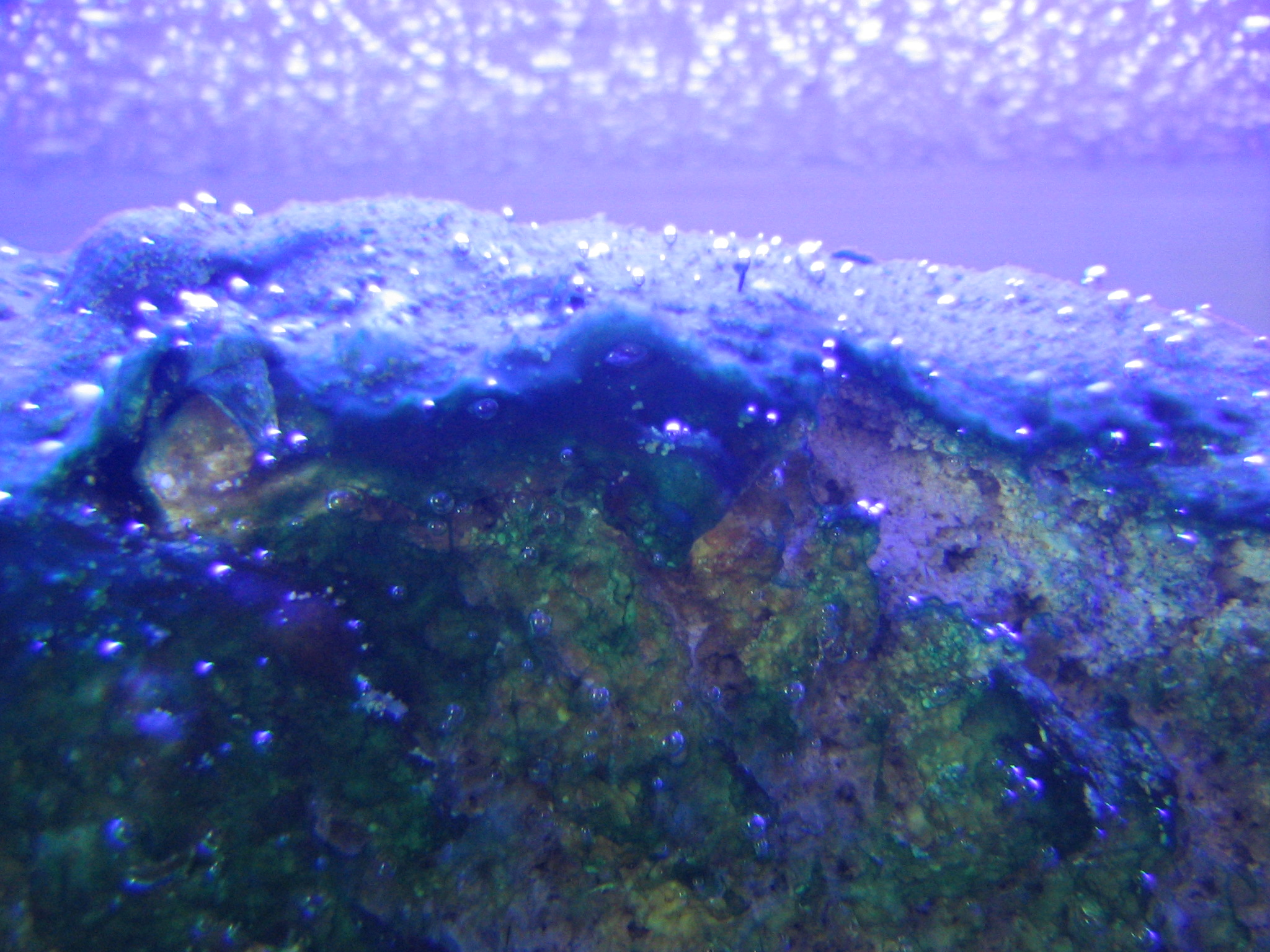
Hamelin Pool stromatolites close-up

The Hamelin Pool Marine Nature Reserve is a protected marine nature reserve located in the UNESCO World Heritage–listed Shark Bay in the Gascoyne region of Western Australia. The 127,000-hectare (310,000-acre) nature reserve boasts the most diverse and abundant examples of living marine stromatolites in the world, monuments to life on Earth over 3,500 million years BP.

== Location and access ==
Hamelin Pool is the eastern major waters within Shark Bay, separated from the western area by the Peron Peninsula, with a smaller water body just adjacent to its northern border with Faure Island - L'Haridon Bight the juncture being defined by Petit Point. At the northern edge of the Hamelin Pool area is the Wooramel Seagrass Bank. The marine reserve is situated adjacent to the Hamelin Station Reserve and the historic Hamelin Pool Telegraph Station about 30 kilometres (19 mi) west of the Overlander Roadhouse on the North West Coastal Highway. Access is via Hamelin Pool Road and then through the Hamelin Pool Telegraph Station grounds. Access is free.

== Marine reserve ==
Hamelin Pool was named after Jacques Félix Emmanuel Hamelin (1768–1839), a French naval officer and captain of the Naturaliste. Its French name is Havre Hamelin.

The Marine Reserve covers 1,270 square kilometres (490 sq mi). It is one of only a few places in the world where living marine stromatolites can be found. Other locations for stromatolites include an underwater site (6 metres (20 ft) deep) in the Caribbean, Persian Gulf, and in the Great Salt Lake of Utah. Hamelin Pool contains the most diverse range of stromatolites and microbial diversity in the world.

The stromatolites in Hamelin Pool were discovered by surveyors working for an oil exploration company in 1956 and were the first living examples of structures built by cyanobacteria. The cyanobacteria living in Hamelin Pool are direct descendants of the oldest form of photosynthetic life on earth. The stromatolites are similar to 3,500 million year old stromatolite fossils found in many places around the world. Stromatolites are an example of the earliest record of life on earth. They are found around the shores, mostly in the neighbourhood of 26°23′S 114°09′E.

Hamelin Pool is hypersaline (it has approximately double the salinity of normal seawater), providing an ideal environment for the stromatolites to grow, and inhibiting other marine life which would normally feed on the bacteria. The cyanobacteria live in communities on the sea bed at densities of 3 billion individuals per square metre. They are the simplest life forms to use photosynthesis to provide food and oxygen. They provided the early Earth with most of its oxygen atmosphere billions of years before plants appeared. Very fine particles of solids i.e. sand, crushed shell etc. are trapped by the sticky bacteria, to become cemented with calcium carbonate produced by the bacteria, thereby building up the stromatolite structures. Some structures are pillars up to 1.5 metres (5 ft) high and have taken thousands of years to grow. In the Marble Bar area of Western Australia there are fossil stromatolites approximately 50 metres (160 ft) high and 30 metres (98 ft) diameter. These are estimated to be over three billion years old. Typical growth is about 0.5 millimetres (0.020 in) per year.

There are three basic types of stromatolite, the sub-tidal (always under water) columns and the inter-tidal (exposed to air and sun during low tides) anvil or mushroom shapes depicted in most pictures. Algal mats form in the inter-tidal region and appear as areas of flat black mud flats but are actually living stromatolite.

At Hamelin Pool there is an interpretive boardwalk for tourists to venture out and examine the stromatolite structures. This is the only access area for the general public because of the fragile nature of the environment in the Hamelin Pool.

The Hutchinson Island and the Pelican Island are located within the nature reserve.

== Telegraph station ==
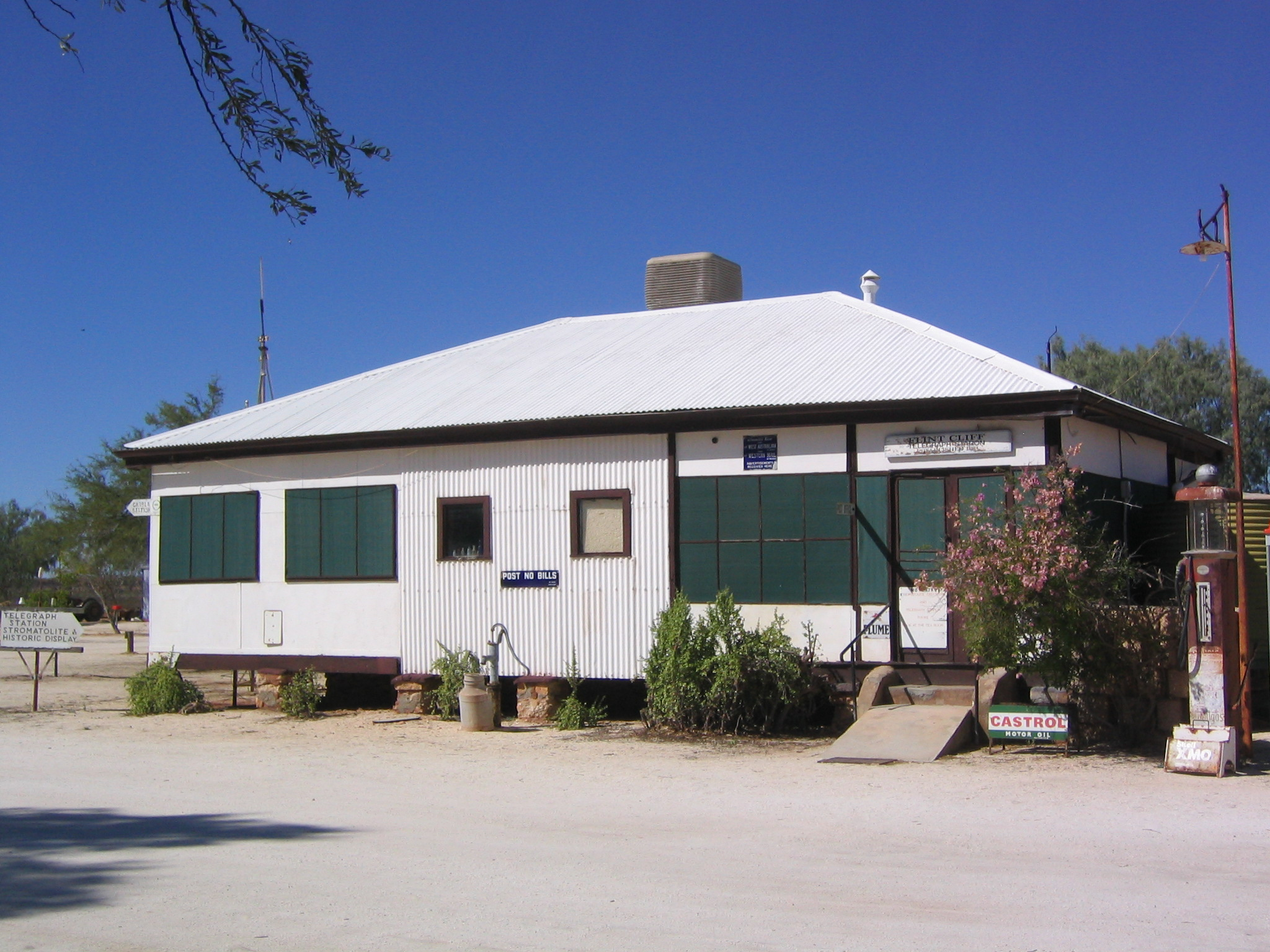
Hamelin Pool Telegraph Station

At the Historic Hamelin Pool Telegraph Station built in 1884 and Historic Old Post Office first built in 1886 now the local Community Post Office/Public Phone Box. The museum showing information on the growth of stromatolites and includes what is the only stromatolites living in captivity (in an aquarium) in the world. The museum also covers the building and operation of the Historic Telegraph Station back to the 1880s.
