= Ilkurlka Community =

Roadhouse in outback Western Australia

Coordinates: 28°22′35″S 127°30′05″E

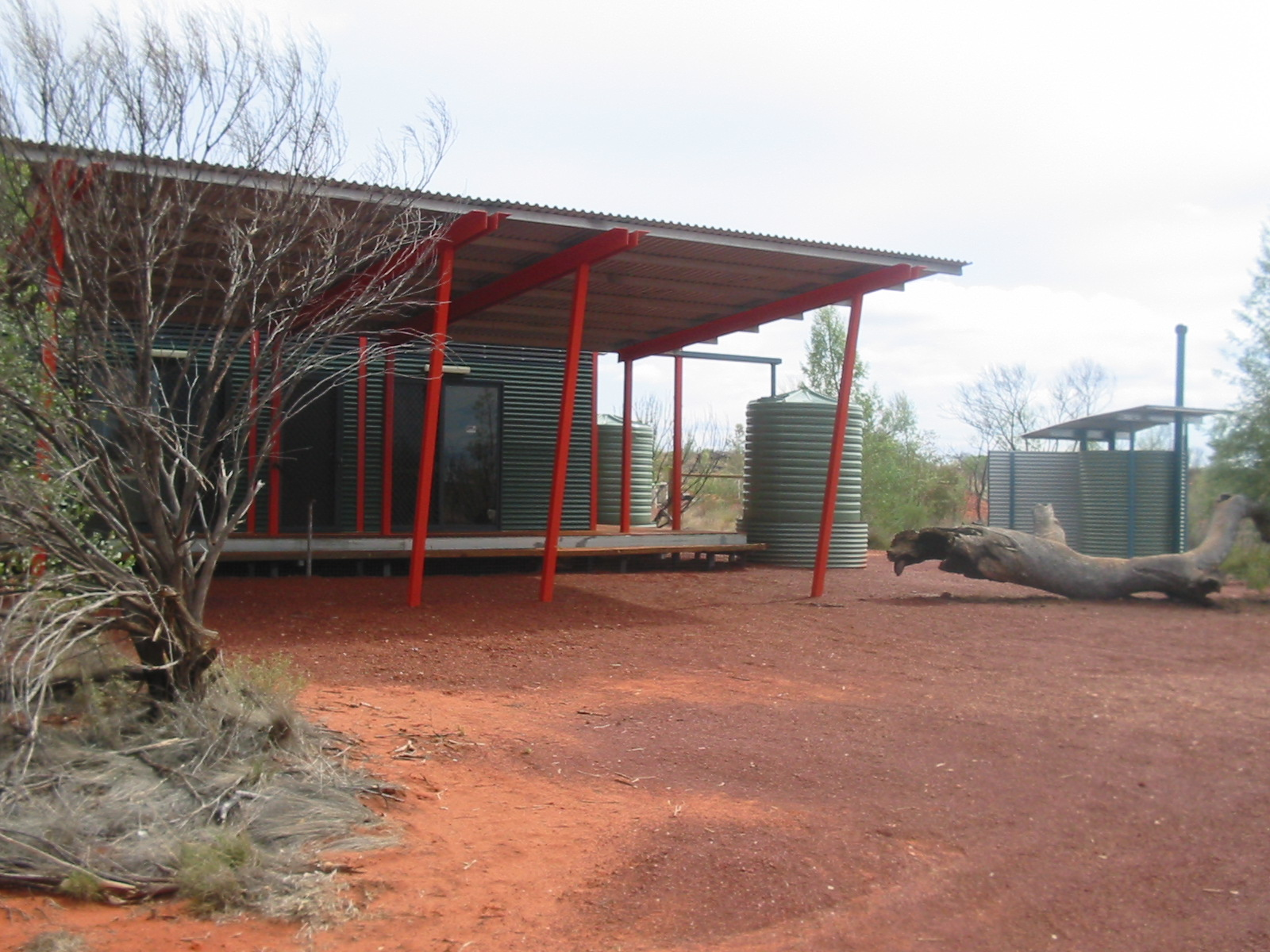
Ilkurlka Roadhouse

Ilkurlka, sometimes spelt Ilkulka, is a location on the Anne Beadell Highway in Western Australia, comprising a roadhouse, tiny outstation and cultural centre of the Spinifex people.

== History ==
The Spinifex people, a group of Aboriginal Australian peoples, occupied the Great Victoria Desert up to 25,000 years ago. After displacement to Yakatunya by British nuclear tests at Maralinga in the 1950s, and subsequent compensation paid decades afterwards, Spinifex people built water bores and airstrips at Tjuntjuntjara and Ilkurlka. By around 1989 the Spinifex people had moved from Yakatunya and resettled at Tjuntjuntjara and Ilkurlka.

Following a 1995 native title claim, the Spinifex people were granted native title over 55,000 sq km (5.5 million ha) of the Great Victoria Desert in 2000. Ilkurlka is located in the centre of these lands.

== Description ==
The main structures at Ilkurlka are the buildings comprising the roadhouse and visitors' centre, which includes an art gallery showcasing the work of local artists.

Built in 2003 by the Spinifex people, the main purpose of the roadhouse is to serve the Aboriginal communities to the north and south, such as Tjuntjuntjara. The roadhouse is managed by Ilkurlka Aboriginal Corporation on behalf of the traditional owners of the land. All facilities are solar-powered, with a generator for backup if needed.

As of January 2023, the roadhouse is run by British-born Philip Merry, who has been in charge for 12 years.

== Art ==
There is a large U-shaped rockhole nearby known as Ikurlka rockhole, which has been depicted in a painting by local artist Simon Hogan, now hanging in the British Museum. Hogan has travelled around Australia and Europe with travelling exhibitions, including to the UK for the exhibition containing his work at the British Museum in 2015. A photograph of Hogan shaking the hand of King Charles (then Prince) hangs in the roadhouse gallery.

The roadhouse is the gallery outlet for the Spinifex Arts Project, and has paintings by well-known local artists, most of whom live in Tjuntjuntjara, on sale.

== Location and travellers' facilities ==
Located 165 kilometres (103 mi) west of the South Australia border, the roadhouse is the only fuel and supplies depot on the 1,300-kilometre (810 mi) desert track between Laverton and Coober Pedy known as the Anne Beadell Highway.It is 600 kilometres (370 mi) east of Laverton and 750 kilometres (470 mi) west of Coober Pedy. The nearest community is Cosmo Newberry, 200 kilometres (120 mi) to the west, making this the most isolated roadhouse in Australia.

There is accommodation in the form of a studio, built on top of a hill, and a campsite with a hot shower, toilet and covered barbeque area. Basic DIY mechanical repairs are available. There is also an airstrip, mostly used by the weekly mail plane.

As the roadhouse is on the land of the Spinifex people, no alcohol is available.
