= Wooramel Seagrass Bank =

Seagrass area in Western Australia

Wooramel Seagrass Bank is a large deposit of carbonate sediment, a sand bank, formed by diverse communities of seagrasses off the coast of Carnarvon, Western Australia. The mattes of seagrass meadows and stands consolidate a shallow platform of sandy substrate by acting as an organic baffle against currents and tides. These colonies provide food and shelter to many of the species within the Shark Bay Marine Park.

The bank occurs in the easternmost bay of the Shark Bay World Heritage area. It is a structure 129 kilometres long and around 8 kilometres wide, comprising various communities on sand plains, tidal channels and other coastal habitats. The space taken up is 1030 km^{2}, making it the largest seagrass bank in the world. The only other comparable structure is found in the Mediterranean.

Shark Bay has the largest number of seagrass species recorded in one area. Twelve species have been identified in the area, with nine species being found in some locations. The stands or meadows usually comprise one to four species of seagrass.

The marine fauna associated with the bank - including fish, crustaceans and echinoderms - are diverse and numerous. These indirectly contribute to the forming of the bank; the baffle effect of the seagrass communities trap the carbonate deposits of their organisms remains. The endangered Dugong, represented by one of largest remaining populations (over 500 individuals), forages along the Wooramel bank.

The area was first documented in 1970, with several studies and applications for environmental protection since that time. The Register of the National Estate at the Australian Heritage Database describes this natural feature as "internationally significant" for its seagrass diversity, associated marine life, and as "worldwide benchmark for research" into these structures.

== See also ==
- Seagrasses of Western Australia
- Wooramel River
