= Shark Bay =

Bay of the Indian Ocean in Western Australia

Shark Bay, Western Australia
UNESCO World Heritage Site
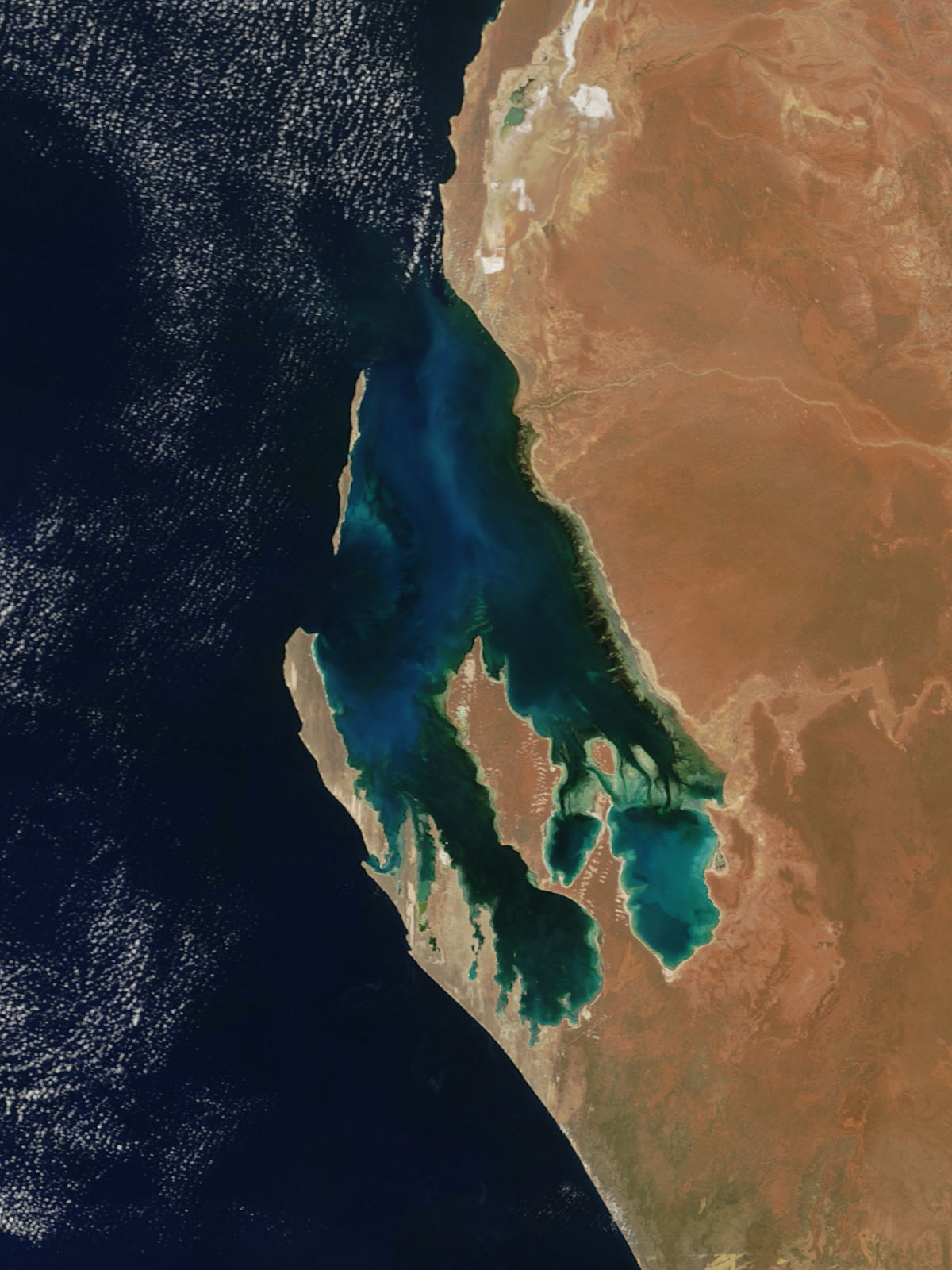
- Shark Bay

- Location within Australia
- Location: Gascoyne region, Western Australia, Australia
- Criteria: Natural: vii, viii, ix, x
- Reference: 578
- Inscription: 1991 (15th Session)
- Area: 2,200,902 ha (5,438,550 acres)
- Coordinates: 25°30′S 113°30′E

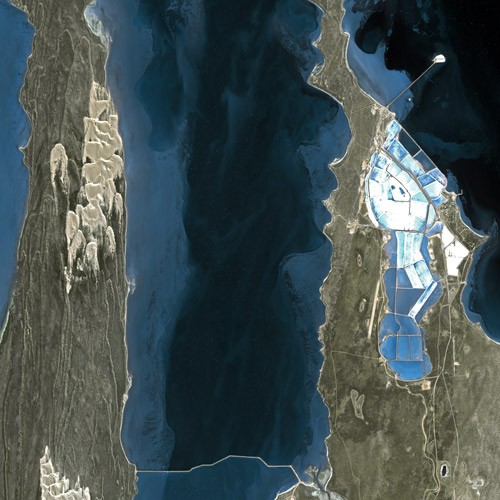
Louis Henri de Saulces de Freycinet's Useless Harbour in Shark Bay, seen from the SPOT satellite

Map of Shark Bay area

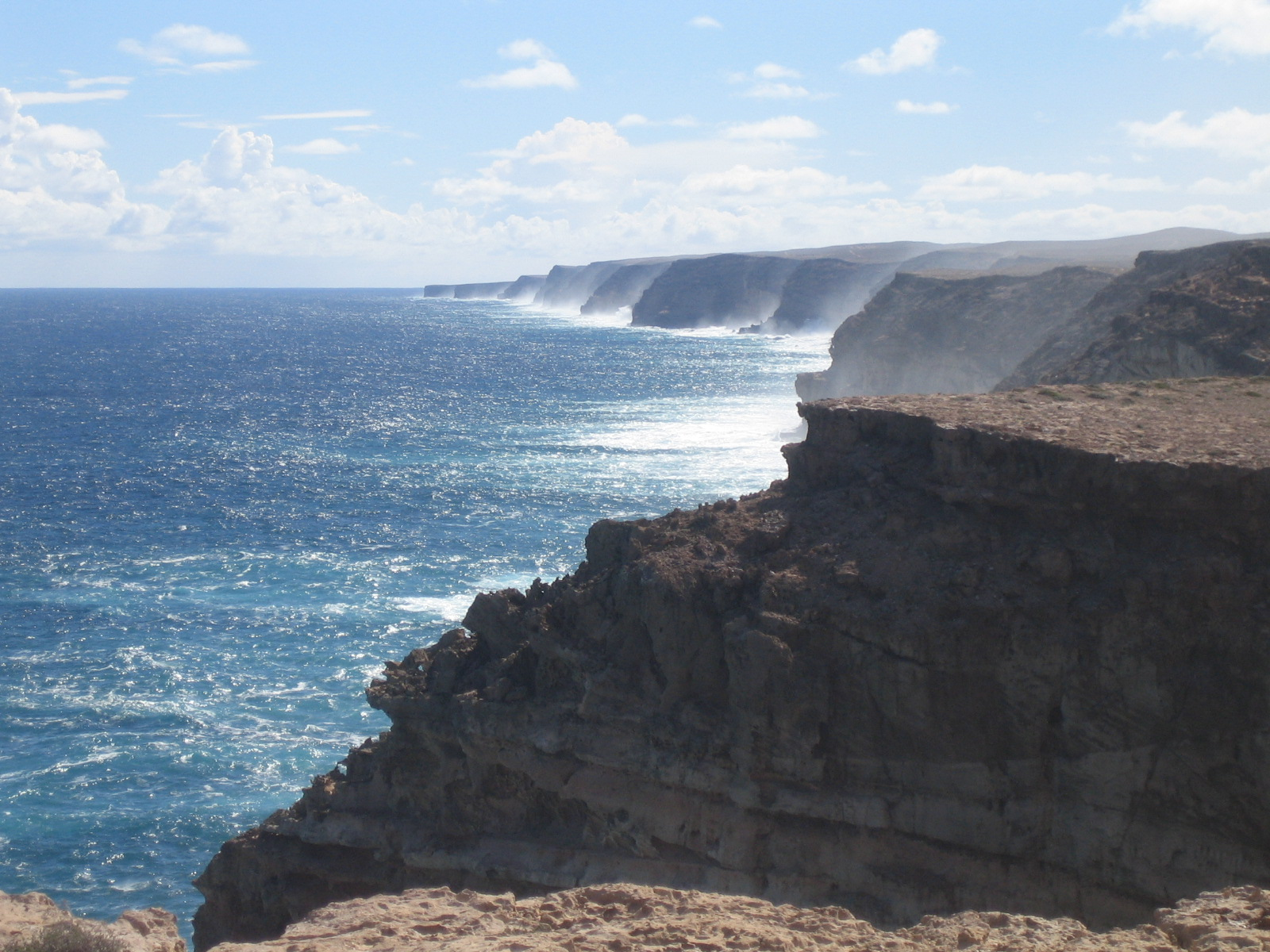
Zuytdorp Cliffs

Shark Bay (Malgana: Gathaagudu, lit. 'two waters') is a World Heritage Site in the Gascoyne region of Western Australia. The 23,000-square-kilometre (8,900 sq mi) area is located approximately 800 kilometres (500 mi) north of Perth, on the westernmost point of the Australian continent.

UNESCO's listing of Shark Bay as a World Heritage Site reads:

Shark Bay's waters, islands and peninsulas....have a number of exceptional natural features, including one of the largest and most diverse seagrass beds in the world. However, it is for its stromatolites (colonies of microbial mats that form hard, dome-shaped deposits which are said to be the oldest life forms on earth), that the property is most renowned. The property is also famous for its rich marine life including a large population of dugongs, and provides a refuge for a number of other globally threatened species.

The bay features Australia's most abundant marine ecosystems. It is a popular fishing spot.

== History ==
The record of Australian Aboriginal occupation of Shark Bay extends to 22,000 years BP. At that time most of the area was dry land, and rising sea levels flooded Shark Bay between 8,000 BP and 6,000 BP. A considerable number of Aboriginal midden sites have been found, especially on Peron Peninsula and Dirk Hartog Island, which provide evidence of some of the foods gathered from the waters and nearby land areas.

An expedition led by Dirk Hartog happened upon the area in 1616, becoming the second group of Europeans known to have visited Australia, after the crew of Duyfken under Willem Janszoon had visited Cape York in 1606. The area was given the name Shark Bay by the English explorer William Dampier, on 7 August 1699. Shark Bay was also visited by Louis Aleno de St Aloüarn in 1772, Nicolas Baudin from 1801 to 1803 and Louis de Freycinet in 1818. Europeans, mostly pastoralists, settled in Shark Bay during the 1860s to 1870s. Pearling developed rapidly from 1870.

Commercial whaling was conducted in the bay in the first half of the 20th century by Norwegian-owned factory ships and their catcher vessels. In the late 1930s, up to 1,000 humpback whales were taken per season.

The heritage-listed area had a population of fewer than 1,000 people as at the 2011 census. The half-dozen small communities making up this population occupy less than 1% of the total area.

== Climate ==
The Shark Bay Heritage Area has a hot desert climate under the Köppen Climate Classification, with hot, dry summers, and very mild, relatively wet winters.

Climate data for Shark Bay Airport (25º53'S, 113º35'E, 34 m AMSL) (2000-2025 normals, 2000-2026 extremes)
Month	Jan	Feb	Mar	Apr	May	Jun	Jul	Aug	Sep	Oct	Nov	Dec	Year
Record high °C (°F)	49.2 (120.6)	49.8 (121.6)	47.2 (117.0)	39.9 (103.8)	37.0 (98.6)	30.7 (87.3)	30.3 (86.5)	35.6 (96.1)	36.7 (98.1)	42.8 (109.0)	44.8 (112.6)	46.2 (115.2)	49.8 (121.6)
Mean daily maximum °C (°F)	34.1 (93.4)	34.9 (94.8)	34.2 (93.6)	31.0 (87.8)	27.5 (81.5)	23.8 (74.8)	22.9 (73.2)	24.2 (75.6)	26.1 (79.0)	28.4 (83.1)	30.4 (86.7)	32.5 (90.5)	29.2 (84.5)
Mean daily minimum °C (°F)	21.6 (70.9)	22.3 (72.1)	21.4 (70.5)	18.3 (64.9)	14.5 (58.1)	11.7 (53.1)	10.6 (51.1)	11.2 (52.2)	12.8 (55.0)	15.4 (59.7)	17.7 (63.9)	19.8 (67.6)	16.4 (61.6)
Record low °C (°F)	16.3 (61.3)	16.5 (61.7)	13.8 (56.8)	10.0 (50.0)	4.5 (40.1)	3.7 (38.7)	2.8 (37.0)	5.0 (41.0)	6.2 (43.2)	7.6 (45.7)	10.3 (50.5)	13.2 (55.8)	2.8 (37.0)
Average precipitation mm (inches)	6.7 (0.26)	24.5 (0.96)	16.3 (0.64)	10.3 (0.41)	23.1 (0.91)	42.3 (1.67)	28.6 (1.13)	19.3 (0.76)	8.1 (0.32)	4.6 (0.18)	2.1 (0.08)	7.1 (0.28)	193 (7.6)
Average precipitation days (≥ 1.0 mm)	0.7	1.2	0.9	1.1	2.8	4.3	4.1	3.1	2.0	1.2	0.5	0.3	22.2
Average relative humidity (%)	43	43	38	41	40	42	43	39	40	41	41	41	41
Average dew point °C (°F)	16.7 (62.1)	17.4 (63.3)	14.6 (58.3)	13.1 (55.6)	10.1 (50.2)	8.1 (46.6)	7.7 (45.9)	6.9 (44.4)	8.3 (46.9)	10.4 (50.7)	12.3 (54.1)	14.1 (57.4)	11.6 (53.0)
Source: Bureau of Meteorology

== Shark Bay World Heritage Site ==
The World Heritage status of the region was created and negotiated in 1991, the first such site in Western Australia. The site was gazetted on the Australian National Heritage List on 21 May 2007 under the Environment and Heritage Legislation Amendment Act (No. 1), 2003.

=== Protected areas ===
Declared as a World Heritage Site in 1991, the site covers an area of 23,000 square kilometres (8,900 sq mi), of which about 70 per cent are marine waters. It includes many protected areas and conservation reserves, including Shark Bay Marine Park, Francois Peron National Park, Hamelin Pool Marine Nature Reserve, Zuytdorp Nature Reserve and numerous protected islands. Denham and Useless Loop both fall within the boundary of the site, yet are specifically excluded from it.

=== Landforms ===
The bay itself covers an area of 1,300,000 hectares (3,200,000 acres), with an average depth of 9 metres (30 ft). It is divided by shallow banks and has many peninsulas and islands. The coastline is over 1,500 kilometres (930 mi) long. There are about 300 kilometres (190 mi) of limestone cliffs overlooking the bay. One spectacular segment of cliffs is known as the Zuytdorp Cliffs. The bay is located in the transition zone between three major climatic regions and between two major botanical provinces.

Peron Peninsula divides the bay and is the home of its largest settlements as well as a National Park at the northern end.

Dirk Hartog Island is of historical significance due to landings upon it by early explorers. In 1616, Dirk Hartog landed at Inscription Point on the north end of the island and marked his discovery with a pewter plate, inscribed with the date and nailed to a post. This plate was then replaced by Willem de Vlamingh and returned to the Netherlands. It is now kept in the Rijksmuseum. The Shark Bay Discovery Centre in Denham has a replica of this plate.

Bernier and Dorre islands in the north-west corner of the heritage area are among the last-remaining habitats of two varieties of Australian mammals, hare-wallabies, threatened with extinction. They are used, with numerous other smaller islands throughout the marine park, to release threatened species that are being bred at Project Eden in François Peron National Park. These islands are free of feral non-native animals which might predate upon the threatened species, and so provide a safe haven in which to restore species that are threatened on the mainland.

In 1999 the Australian Wildlife Conservancy acquired the 5,816-hectare (14,370-acre) pastoral lease over Faure Island, off Monkey Mia. Sea turtles nest there seasonally and are the subject of studies conducted in conjunction with the Department of Biodiversity, Conservation and Attractions.

=== Fauna ===
Shark Bay is an area of major zoological importance. It is home to about 10,000 dugongs ('sea cows'), around 12.5% of the world's population, and there are many Indo-Pacific bottlenose dolphins, particularly at Monkey Mia. The dolphins here have been particularly friendly since the 1960s. The area supports 26 threatened Australian mammal species, over 230 species of bird, and nearly 150 species of reptile. It is an important breeding and nursery ground for fish, crustaceans, and coelenterates. There are over 323 fish species, many of them sharks and rays.

Some bottlenose dolphins in Shark Bay exhibit one of the few known cases of tool use in marine mammals (along with sea otters): using a sea sponge to hunt fish. Humpback and southern right whales use the waters of the bay as migratory staging post while other species such as Bryde's whale come into the bay less frequently to feed or rest. The threatened green and loggerhead sea turtles nest on the bay's sandy beaches. The largest fish in the world, the whale shark, gathers in the bay during the April and May full moons.

=== Flora ===
Shark Bay has the largest known area of seagrass, with seagrass meadows covering over 4,000 square kilometres (1,500 sq mi) of the bay. It includes the 1,030-square-kilometre (400 sq mi) Wooramel Seagrass Bank, the largest seagrass bank in the world and contains a 200-square-kilometre (77 sq mi) Posidonia australis meadow formed by a single plant, the largest in the world.

Shark Bay also contains the largest number of seagrass species ever recorded in one place; twelve species have been found, with up to nine occurring together in some places. The seagrasses are a vital part of the complex environment of the bay. Over thousands of years, sediment and shell fragments have accumulated in the seagrasses to form vast expanses of seagrass beds. This has raised the sea floor, making the bay shallower. Seagrasses are the basis of the food chain in Shark Bay, providing home and shelter to various marine species and attracting the dugong population.

In Shark Bay's hot, dry climate, evaporation greatly exceeds the annual precipitation rate. Thus, the seawater in the shallow bays becomes very salt-concentrated, or hypersaline. Seagrasses also restrict the tidal flow of waters through the bay area, preventing the ocean tides from diluting the sea water. The water of the bay is 1.5 to 2 times more salty than the surrounding ocean waters.

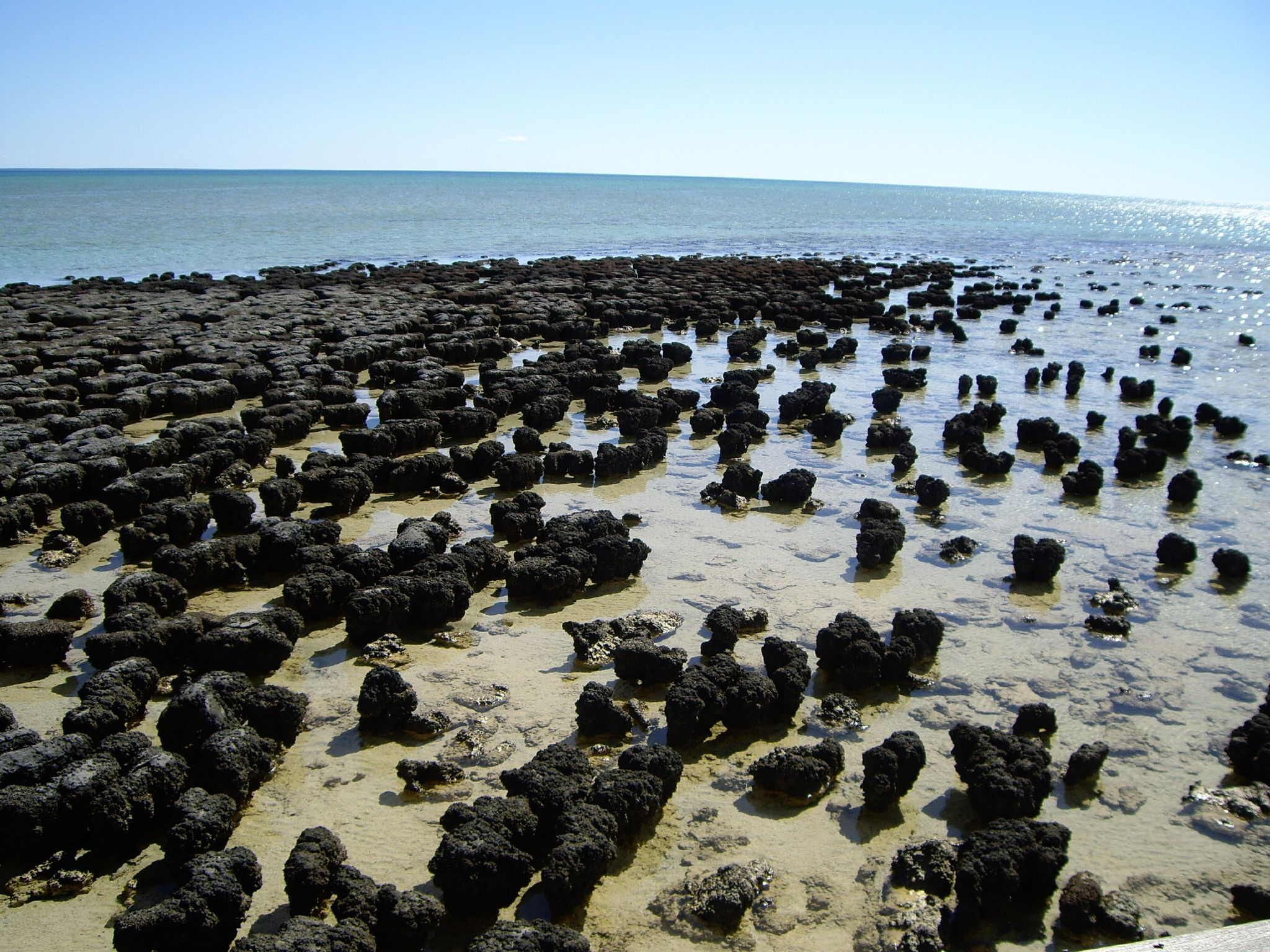
Stromatolites in Hamelin Pool are ancient structures that are built by microbes.

=== Stromatolites ===
Based on growth rate it is believed that about 1,000 years ago cyanobacteria (blue-green algae) began building up stromatolites in Hamelin Pool at the Hamelin Station Reserve in the southern part of the bay. These microbialites, a type of sedimentary structure, are modern examples of some of the earliest signs of life on Earth, with fossilized stromatolites being found dating from 3.5 billion years ago at North Pole near Marble Bar, in Western Australia, and are considered the type of fossil with the longest continuous presence in the geological record. Shark Bay's modern examples were first identified in 1956 at Hamelin Pool, before that only being known in the fossil record. They may, however, be significantly different from fossilised examples, as growth rates may be up to 250 times slower than the estimated growth rates of some Precambrian stromatolites. There is debate, however, over whether this indicates a true difference in growth rate, or if Precambrian growth estimates are instead too high. Hamelin Pool contains the most diverse and abundant examples of living stromatolite forms in the world. Other occurrences are found at Lake Clifton near Mandurah and Lake Thetis near Cervantes. It is hypothesized that some stromatolites contain a new form of chlorophyll, chlorophyll f.

=== Shark Bay World Heritage Discovery Centre ===
Facilities around the World Heritage area, provided by the Shire of Shark Bay and the Department of Biodiversity, Conservation and Attractions, include the Shark Bay World Heritage Discovery Centre in Denham which provides interactive displays and comprehensive information about the features of the region.

=== Access ===
Access to Shark Bay is by air via Shark Bay Airport, and by the World Heritage Drive, a 150-kilometre (93 mi) link road between Denham and the Overlander Roadhouse on the North West Coastal Highway.

== Specific reserved areas ==
=== National parks and reserves in the World Heritage Area ===
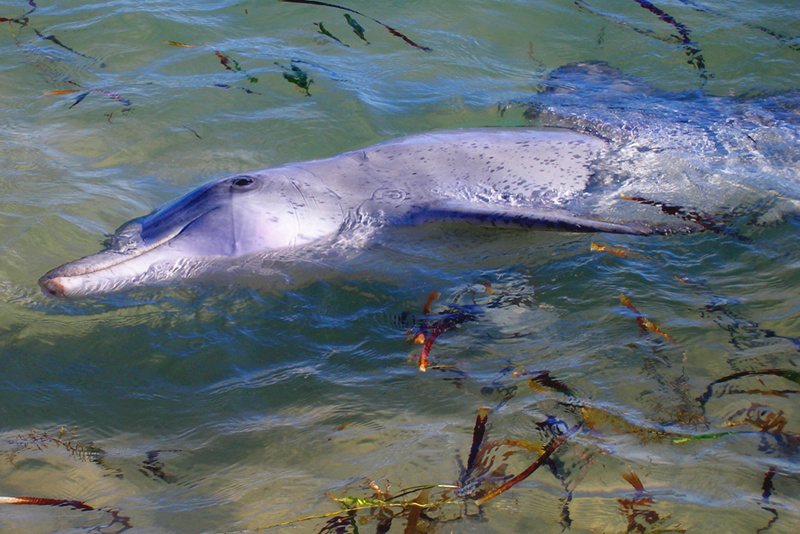
Dolphin at Monkey Mia

- Bernier Island
- Dorre Island
- Charlie Island
- Francois Peron National Park
- Friday Island
- Hamelin Pool Marine Nature Reserve
- Hamelin Pool/East Faure Island High-Low Water Mark
- Koks Island
- Monkey Mia
- Shark Bay Marine Park

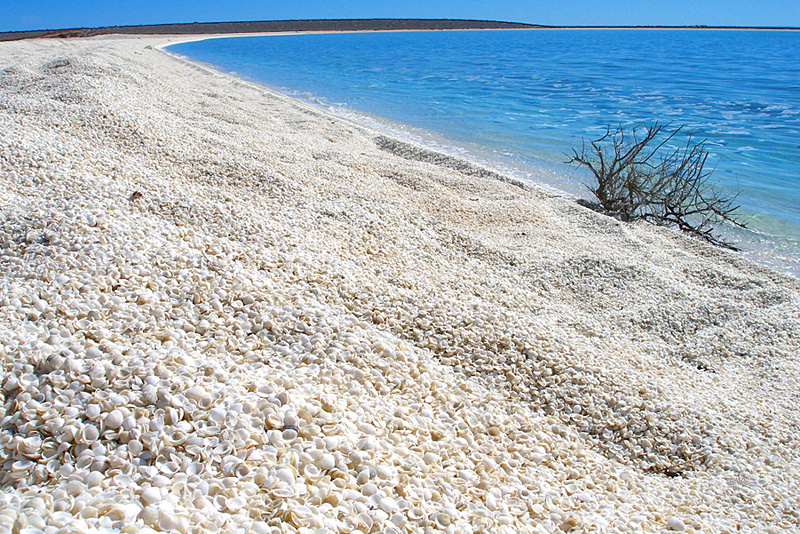
Shell Beach

- Shell Beach
- Small Islands
- Zuytdorp Nature Reserve

=== Bays of the World Heritage area ===
- Hamelin Pool
- Henri Freycinet Harbour
- L'Haridon Bight

=== Islands of the World Heritage area ===
- Bernier Island
- Dirk Hartog Island
- Faure Island

=== Peninsulas of the World Heritage area ===
- Bellefin Prong
- Heirisson Prong
- Carrarang Peninsula
- Peron Peninsula

=== IBRA sub regions of the Shark Bay Area ===
The Shark Bay area has three bioregions within the Interim Biogeographic Regionalisation for Australia (IBRA) system: Carnarvon, Geraldton Sandplains, and Yalgoo. The bioregions are further divided into sub-bioregions:

- Carnarvon bioregion (CAR) –
  - Wooramel sub region (CAR2) – most of Peron Peninsula and coastline east of Hamelin Pool
  - Cape Range sub region (CAR1) – (not represented in area)
- Geraldton Sandplains bioregion (GS) –
  - Geraldton Hills sub region (GS1) – Zuytdorp Nature Reserve area
  - Leseur sub region (GS2) – (not represented in area)
- Yalgoo bioregion (YAL) –
  - Tallering sub region (YAL2) (not represented in area)
  - Edel subregion (YAL1) – Bernier, Dorre and Dirk Hartog Islands

== See also ==
- Search for HMAS Sydney and German auxiliary cruiser Kormoran
- List of islands in Shark Bay
