= Monkey Mia =

Tourist destination known for dolphin interaction in Western Australia

Coordinates: 25°47′41″S 113°43′02″E

Monkey Mia (/mʌŋkiˈmaɪə/ mun-kee-MY-ə) is a popular tourist destination located about 900 kilometres (560 mi) north of Perth, Western Australia. The reserve is 25 kilometres (16 mi) northeast of the town of Denham in the Shark Bay Marine Park and World Heritage Site.

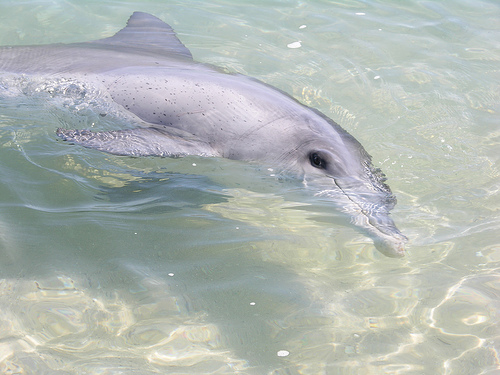
One of Monkey Mia's famous dolphins

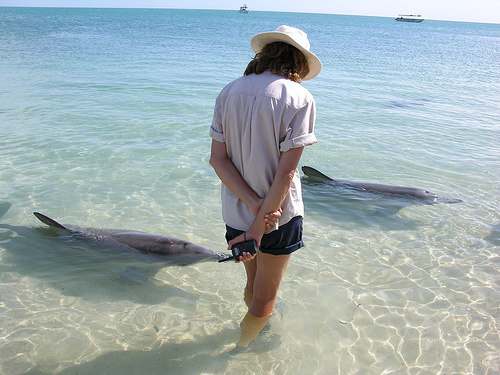
The daily feeding of bottlenose dolphins

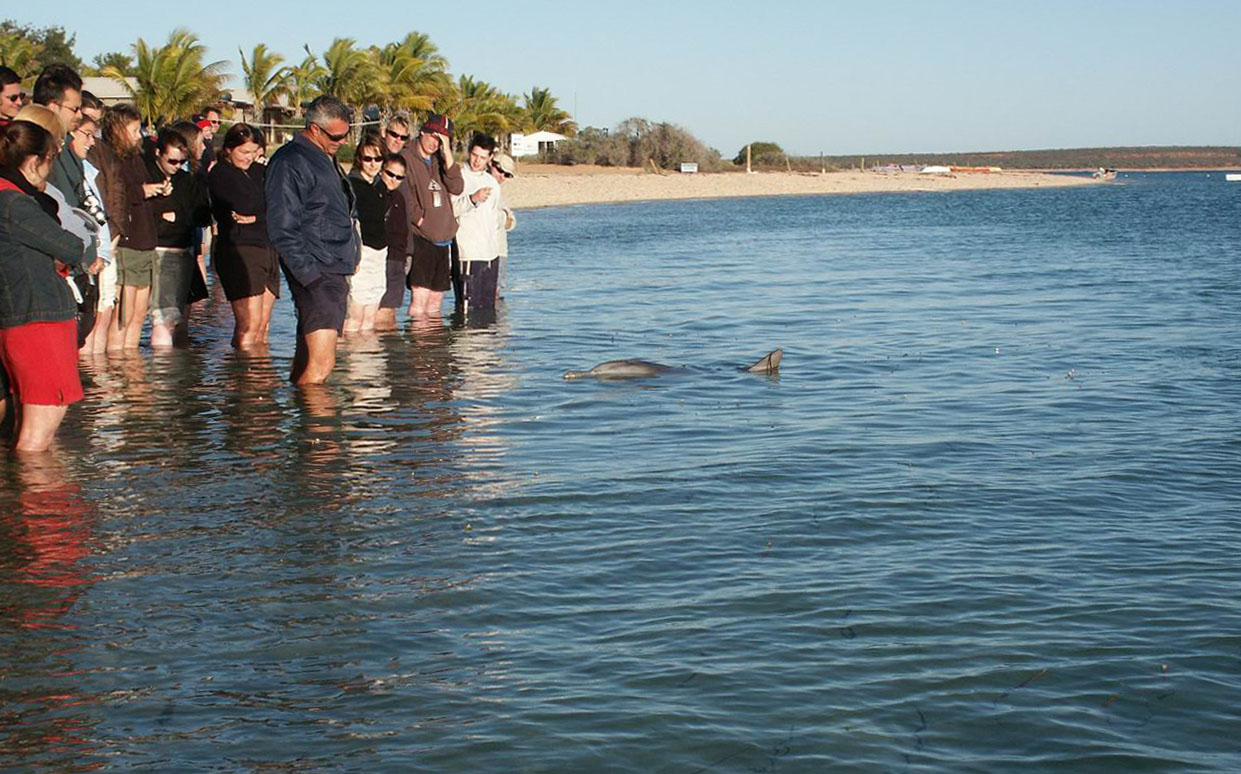
Monkey Mia dolphin feeding

The main attraction are the bottlenose dolphins that have been coming close to shore for more than fifty years. Rangers from the Department of Biodiversity, Conservation and Attractions carefully supervise the interaction between humans and dolphins.

== History ==
Mia is the local Aboriginal term for home or shelter, while the Monkey part of the name is thought to derive from a pearling boat called Monkey that anchored at the now Monkey Mia in the late 19th century, during the days when pearling was an industry in the region. However, the Geographic Names Committee, hosted by Landgate (the Western Australian Land Information Authority) has stated that the most likely origins of the name are that it was included in a list of Aboriginal names and their meanings supplied by the Geraldton Police Station in about 1899 (the meaning of the name is given as 'Salt or bad water') or after the pet monkeys owned by early Malay pearlers who camped at the location, or as a colloquialism for 'sheep', or that it was named for a schooner called Monkey that arrived in 1834.

The area was originally gazetted in 1890 and used as a base for the pearling and fishing industries. In the 1960s, a fisherman and his wife began feeding bottlenose dolphins when returning with their catch. As news of the dolphins coming inshore spread, visitors started to come to see them. In 1985, an information centre was built, and in 1988, a special state government grant was provided to develop roads, carparks, and facilities.

In November 1990, the waters adjoining Monkey Mia were declared a marine park and are managed by the Department of Biodiversity, Conservation and Attractions.

Since then, more attention has been given to the Aboriginal roots of the area and their knowledge of the local land. For visitors, the most visible evidence of this change is the culture walks, where visitors are taught to respect the land.

== Tourism ==
Up to 100,000 tourists visit the area each year. They come mostly to see the dolphins.

=== Dolphin feeding ===
A small pod of dolphins from a larger super-pod regularly swim to shore up to three times a day, and on average 7 or 8 dolphins regularly visit, with up to 20 others visiting less frequently; it can take several years before they gain the confidence to swim to shore. Park rangers closely supervise the interaction and hand-feed fish to the dolphins. Visitors are urged not to touch the dolphins. As of 2015, only five adults are fed and provided no more than 10% of their daily dietary intake.

== Research ==
Monkey Mia is also the laboratory location for extensive behavioural and biological research on bottlenose dolphins. Drawn to the area's famous "beach dolphins", researchers Richard Connor and Rachel Smolker started the Monkey Mia dolphin research project in 1982. Their research interests quickly expanded to include hundreds of the nearby Shark Bay dolphins. Since this visit, scientists have come from prestigious institutions in Australia, North America and Europe. The dolphins have been extensively studied by this international team of scientists since 1984.

== See also ==
- Shark Bay Airport
- Do not feed the animals
