= Coquina =

Sedimentary rock that is composed mostly of fragments of shells

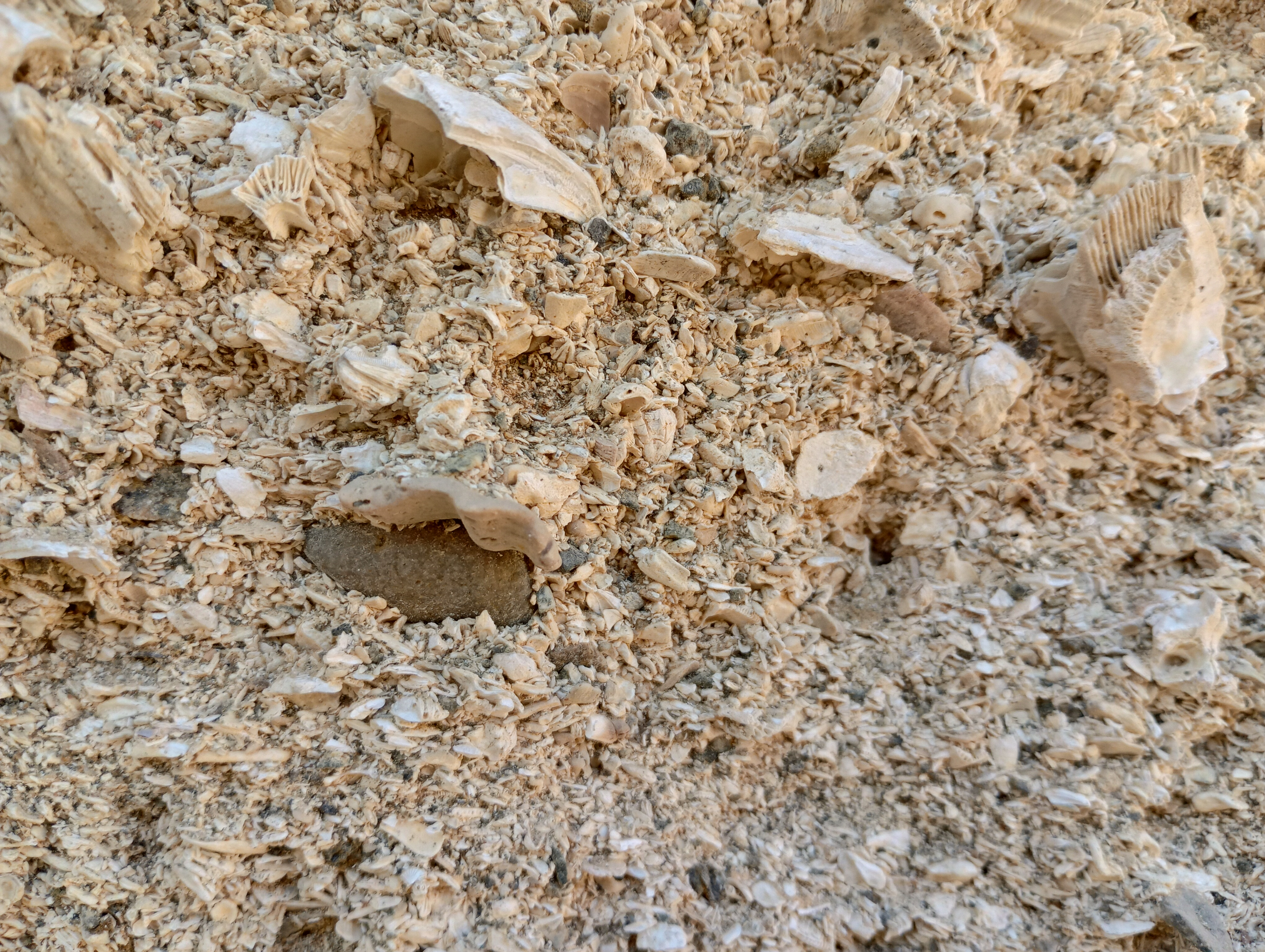
Coquina strata from Caleta Hornos (Coquimbo Formation)

Coquina (/koʊˈkiːnə/) is a sedimentary rock that is composed either wholly or almost entirely of the transported, abraded, and mechanically sorted fragments of mollusks, trilobites, brachiopods, or other invertebrates. The term coquina comes from the Spanish word for "cockle" and "shellfish".

For a sediment to be considered to be a coquina, the particles composing it should average 2 mm (0.079 in) or greater in size. Coquina can vary in hardness from poorly to moderately cemented. Incompletely consolidated and poorly cemented coquinas are considered grainstones in the Dunham classification system for carbonate sedimentary rocks. A well-cemented coquina is classified as a biosparite (fossiliferous limestone) according to the Folk classification of sedimentary rocks.

Coquinas accumulate in high-energy marine and lacustrine environments where currents and waves result in the vigorous winnowing, abrasion, fracturing, and sorting of the shells that compose them. As a result, they typically exhibit well-developed bedding or cross-bedding, close packing, and good orientation of the shell fragments. The high-energy marine or lacustrine environments associated with coquinas include beaches, shallow submarine raised banks, swift tidal channels, and barrier bars.

== Composition and distribution ==
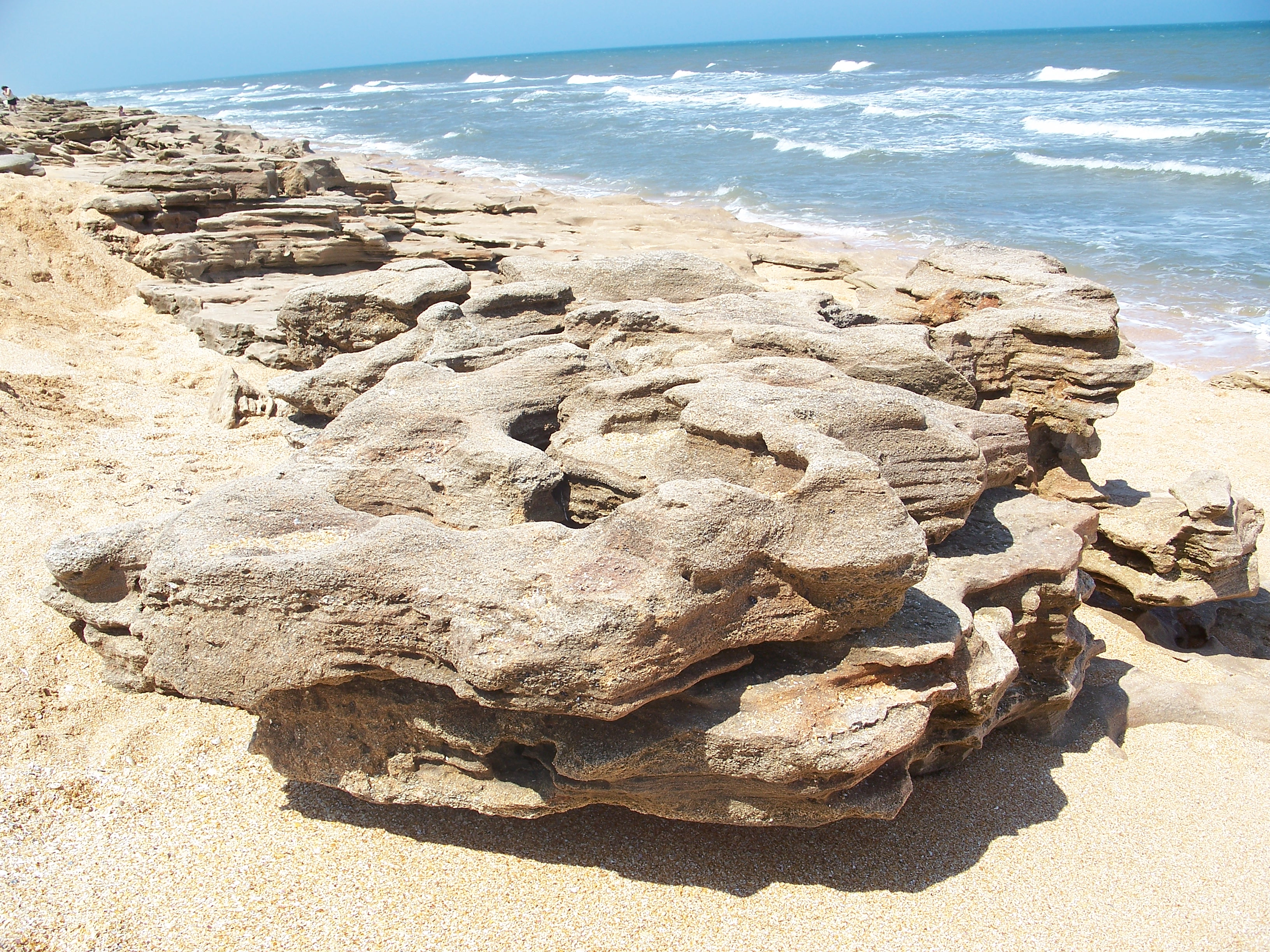
Coquina outcrop on the beach at Washington Oaks State Gardens, Florida

Coquina is composed mainly of the mineral calcite, often including some phosphate, in the form of seashells or coral. Coquinas dating from the Devonian period through to the much more recent Pleistocene epoch are a common find all over the world, with the depositional requirements to form a coquina being a common thing in many marine facies.

== History and use ==
=== Australia ===
Adjacent to Shark Bay Road beginning 45 kilometres (28 mi) southeast of Denham is an approximately 110 kilometres (68 mi) long stretch of coastline composed of billions of tiny shells of the Shark Bay cockle (Fragum erugatum), averaging less than 14 millimetres (0.55 in) in length. The shell deposit, between 8 and 9 metres (26 and 30 ft) thick, has compacted and cemented in some areas into solid masses of limestone that formerly was quarried and cut into blocks used in local construction.

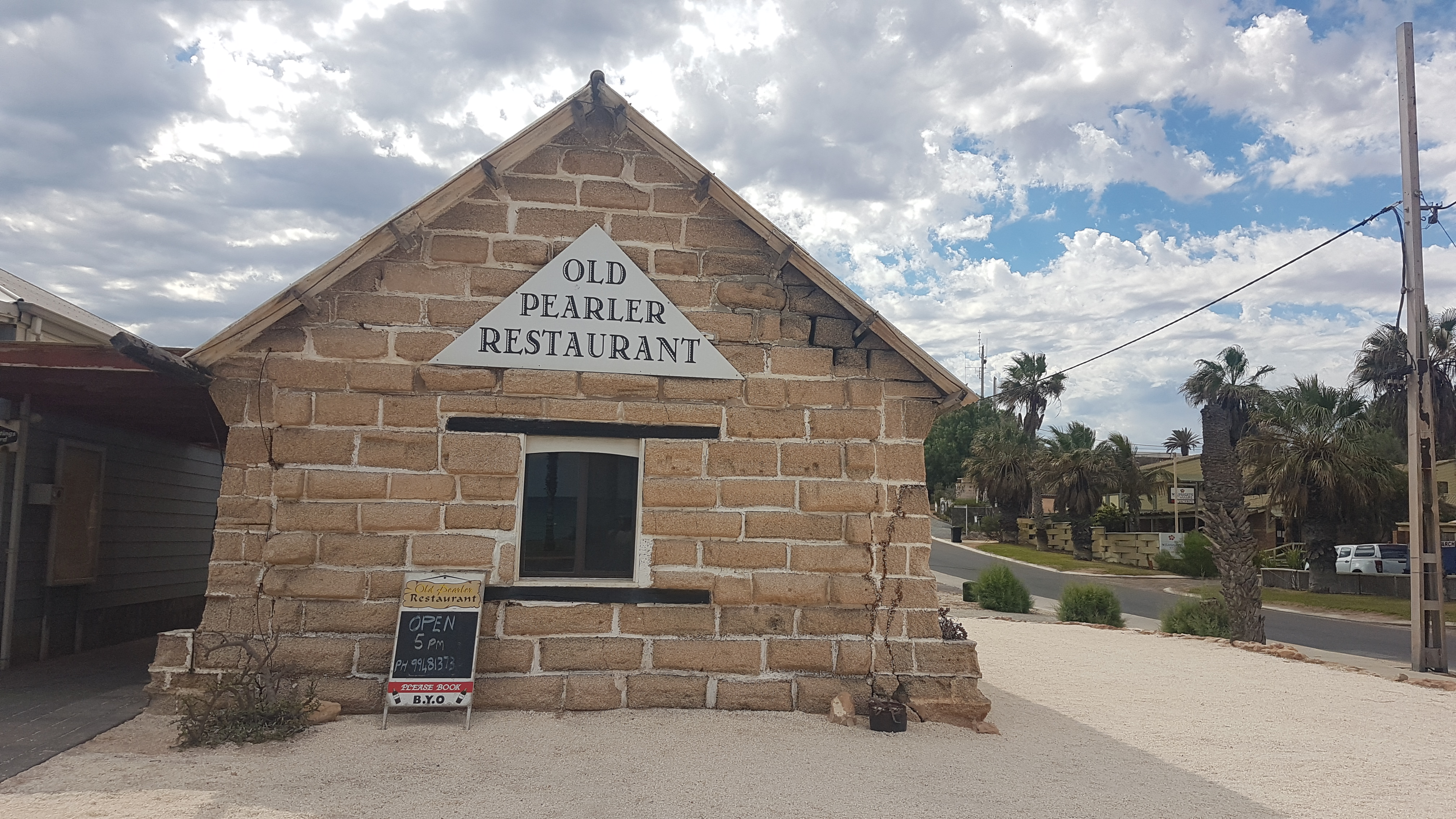

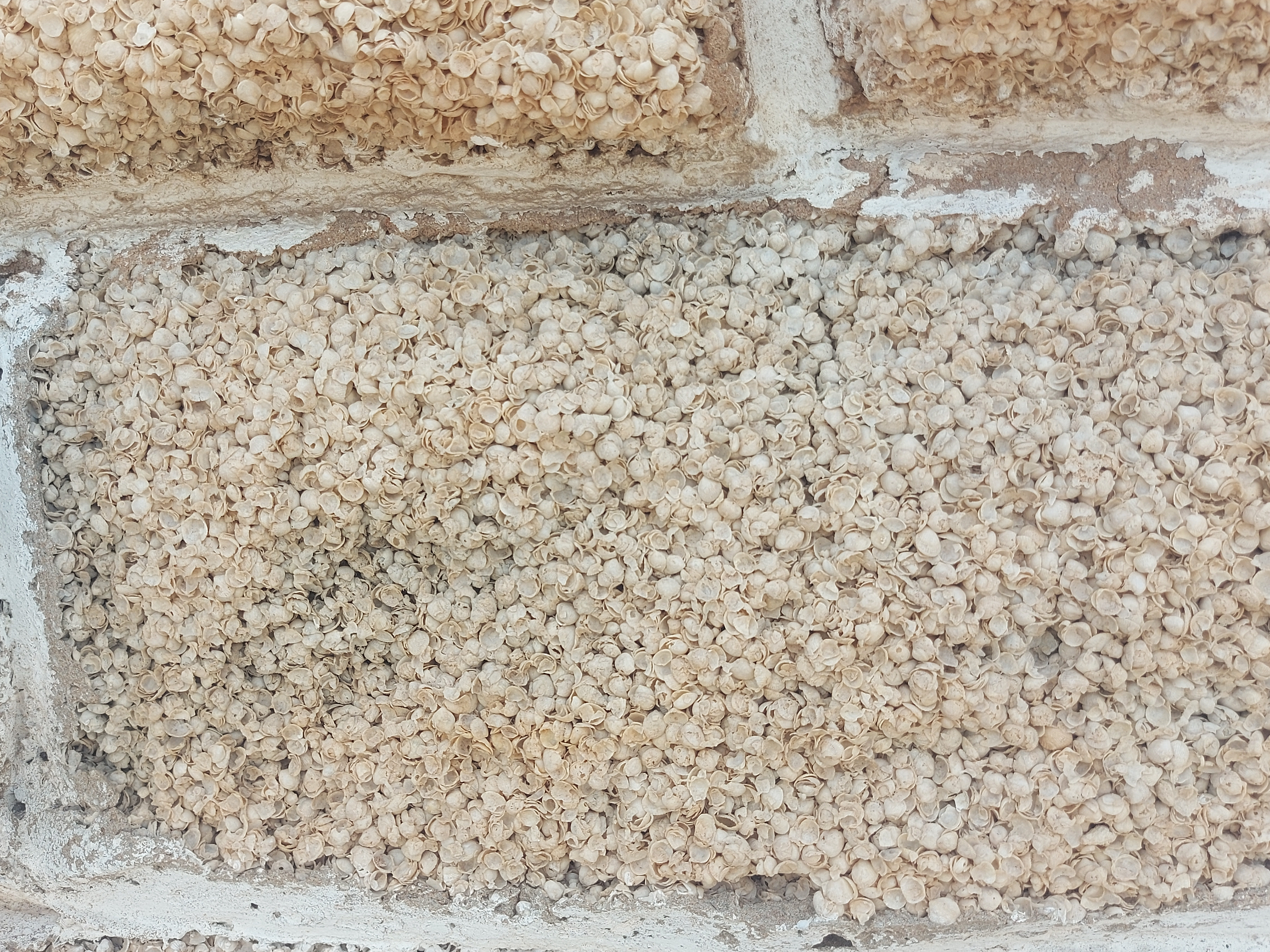
Blocks of Coquina in the wall of the Old Pearler Restaurant in Denham, Western Australia.

St Andrew's Anglican Church, the Old Pearler Restaurant, and parts of the Shark Bay Hotel in Shark Bay were built from coquina shell blocks. The church, built in 1954, has walls infilled with coquina shell blocks between a light steel frame and a shell facing, while the Old Pearler was built in 1974–1977 with buttressed coquina shell block walls.

=== Brazil ===
Recently discovered petroleum-bearing formations off the coast of northeastern Brazil hold coquina reservoirs of oil. The coquinas are generally heterogeneous in their porosity and permeability, but like other lacustrine carbonates, they are uncommonly reservoirs. Corbett et al. (2015) in their discussion of the reservoirs say the finding of the Badejo Field (Campos Basin) in 1975 was the first hydrocarbon discovery in the coquinas of the Lagoa Feia, followed by that of the Pampo and Linguado Fields in 1978. The coquinas of the Morro do Chaves Formation were formed by non-marine bivalves and ostracods. The shells of the bivalves, which lived in shallow oxygenated water, were transported and deposited as washout over stream fans and beaches by storms and long-shore drift.

The palynological record of coquinas of the Sergipe-Alagoas Basin has been analyzed and the sediments dated to the late Barremian age; the results suggest a marine and/or brackish environment. Daniel Thompson (2013) asserts that the coquinas of the Morro do Chaves Formation include a wide range of marine mollusca characteristic of brackish environmental conditions, suggesting periodic marine ingression during the Early Cretaceous.

According to a paper by Senira Kattah published in The Sedimentary Record, the discovery of the Lula Field by Petrobras and partners in 2006 opened petroleum exploration in the Barremian/Aptian pre-salt play in the offshore Santos and Campos basins, and consequently deeper coquina reservoirs have become important targets. He says the two main reservoir targets recognized for the pre-salt within the study areas are: "late rift coquinas, lacustrine facies deposited at the Late Barremian to Early Aptian, and the younger rift/sag microbial limestones deposited during the Aptian, just before the establishment of the major evaporitic sag basin between South America and Africa." There are abundant beds of coquina in the Outer High of the Santos Basin, similar to those from the neighboring Campos. Pre-salt stratigraphy of the Santos Basin shows lacustrine sediments composed of coarse pelecypod (bivalve) coquina during the Barremian and Aptian sag phase of the continental crust subsidence.

=== Mexico ===
Overlying the fossiliferous sands and sandy clays of the upper San Fernando River in northeastern Mexico is a bed of coquina limestone dating probably to the Cenozoic era. Coquina deposits also occur in the Baja California peninsula, including submerged "reefs". So-called coquina "reefs" occur at Punta Borrascosa, San Felipe and Coloraditos on the northeast coast of Baja California. These have been uranium-thorium dated to the Pleistocene epoch, with an age estimated at 130,000 ybp. Semi-continuous coquina outcrops have been found 13 kilometres (8.1 mi) east of Puerto Peñasco, in the shallow subtidal zone or partly submerged under intertidal sands.

Other Pleistocene outcrops occur along both coastlines of the upper Gulf of California. On the Vizcaino Peninsula of western Baja California, the informally named "Tivela stultorum" coquina is abundant in shells of the Pismo clam. Until analysis of the shells by U-series and amino-acids methods is concluded, this marine transgression is assigned an approximate age of 200,000 ybp. Outcrops in Bahía de San Hipolito and Bahía de Asunción are loosely consolidated, sandy beachrock a few meters thick, found 15 to 20 metres (49 to 66 ft) above present mean sea level.

The ancient Maya built their city of Toniná in the highlands of what is now Chiapas in southern Mexico using native rocks to construct its masonry buildings, among them large coquina flagstones from which they made blocks and bricks for floors, walls, and stairways.

=== United States ===
==== Florida ====
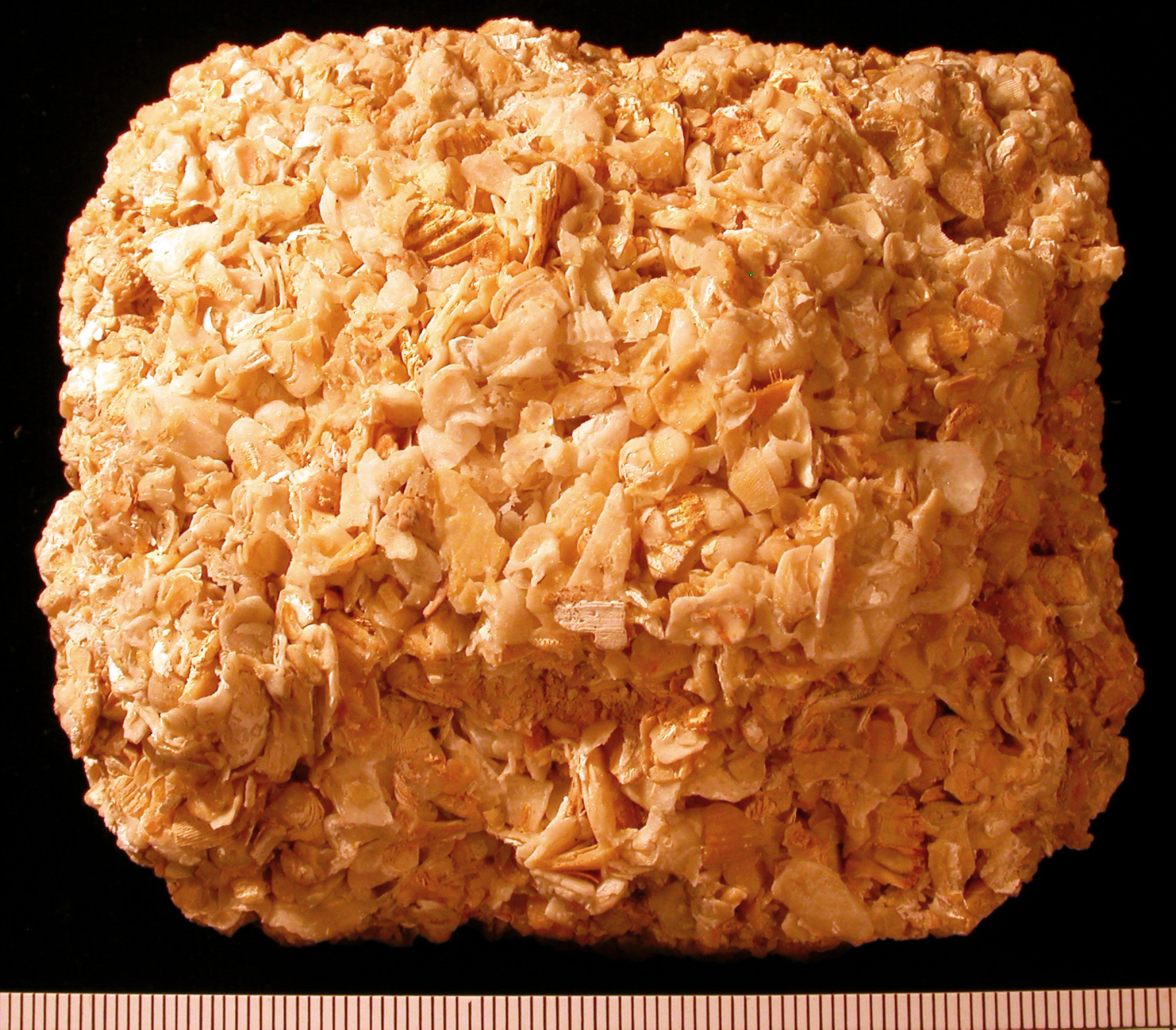
Coquina from Florida

Coquina deposits in Florida occur mostly along the eastern coast of the peninsula. This coquina is named the Anastasia Formation after Anastasia Island, where the Spanish quarried the rock to construct the Castillo de San Marcos, the fortress they built to defend St. Augustine. The Anastasia Formation stretches from just north of St. Augustine in St. Johns County to southern Palm Beach County. The formation and associated sand form part of the Atlantic Coastal Ridge, a Pleistocene barrier island chain that extends from Duval County to Dade County. Other coquina deposits are found in the state, but only in limited areas. The Anastasia Formation is naturally exposed in a number of places along the east coast including Washington Oaks Gardens State Park, Gilbert's Bar House of Refuge, Hutchinson Island in Martin County and Blowing Rocks Preserve, owned by The Nature Conservancy, in Martin County.

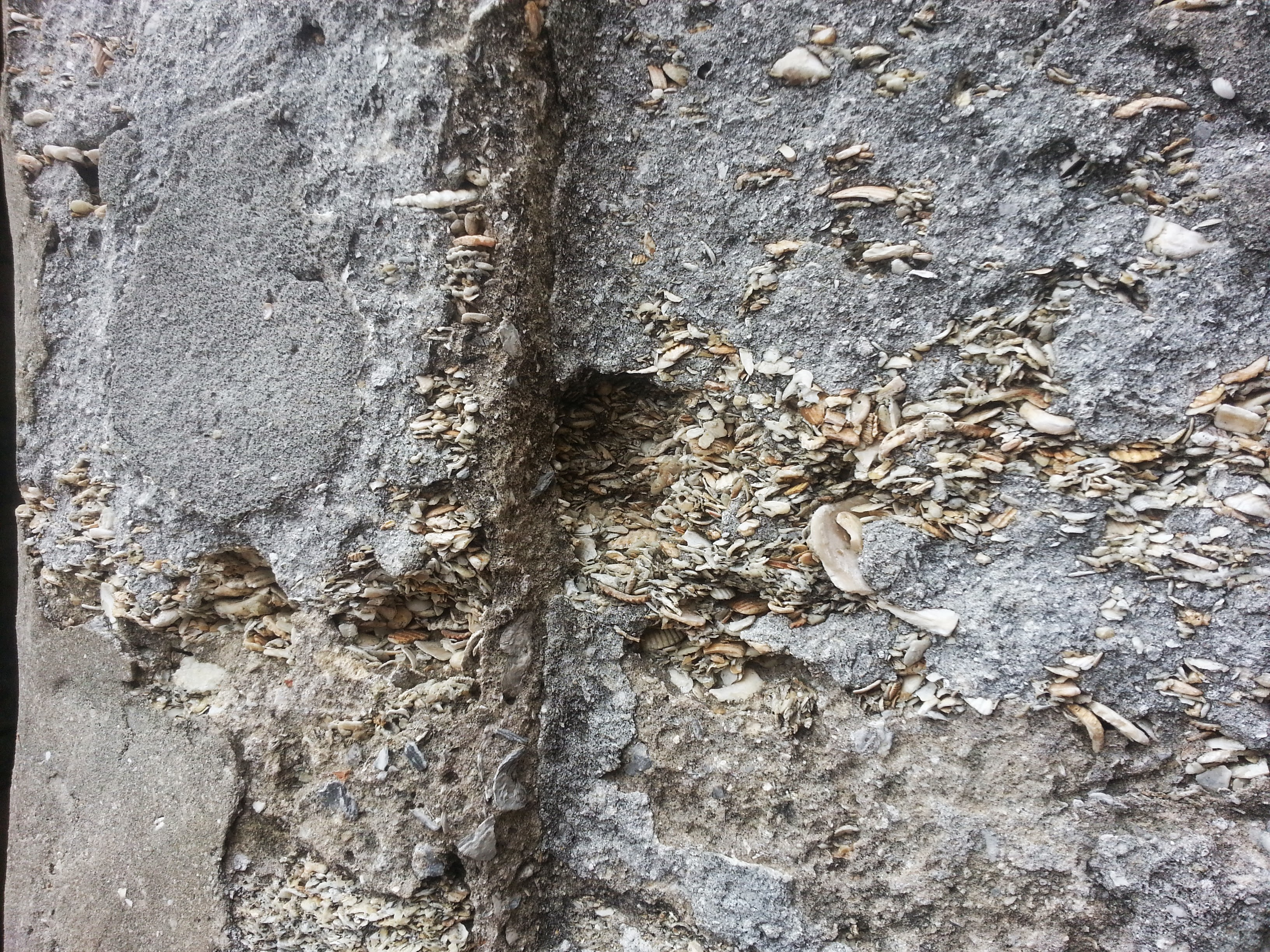
Coquina wall at the Castillo de San Marcos

Still occasionally quarried or mined, and used as a building stone in Florida for over 400 years, coquina forms the walls of the Castillo in St. Augustine. The stone made a very good material for building forts, particularly those built during the period of heavy cannon use. Because of coquina's softness, cannonballs would sink into, rather than shatter or puncture the walls. The first Saint Augustine lighthouse, built by the Spanish, was also made of coquina.

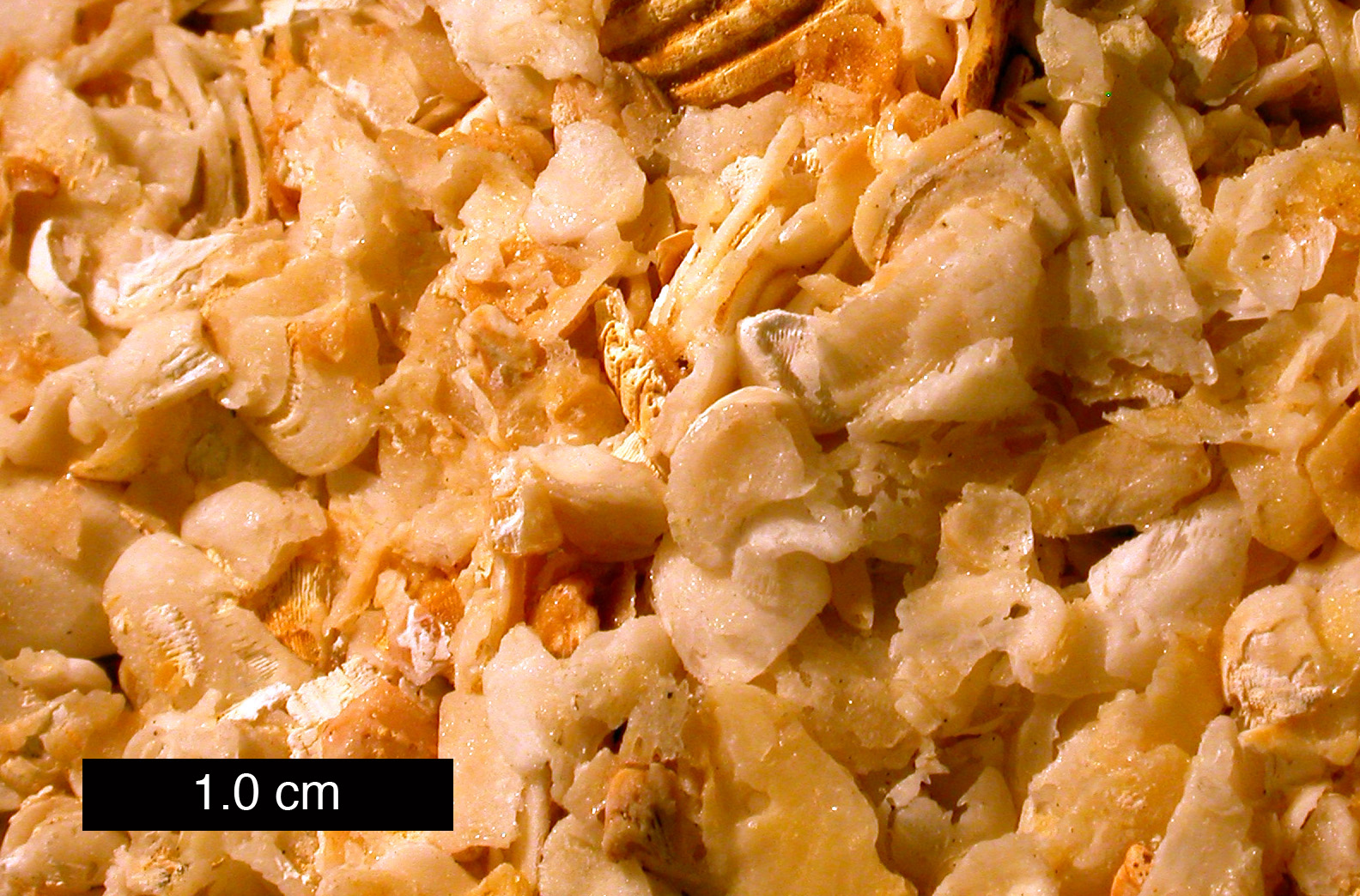
Close-up of coquina from Florida. The scale bar is 10 mm (0.39 in).

Coquina was used as building stone in St. Augustine as early as 1598 for construction of a powder house. This was the beginning of a building tradition that extended into the 1930s along Florida's Atlantic Coast. In the St. Augustine vicinity, the Castillo de San Marcos, Fort Matanzas, the old city gates, the Cathedral, Spanish and British Period residential structures, property line walls and tombs were constructed of coquina quarried on Anastasia Island. To the south in New Smyrna, a large storehouse and wharf were constructed of coquina at the 1770s Andrew Turnbull colony. Around 1816, John Addison constructed a kitchen house of coquina on his plantation on the Tomoka River. The material was also used in the construction of sugar mill buildings on sugar plantations in the 1820s and 1830s. Examples are the Bulow, Dunlawton and New Smyrna sugar mills. In these early structures, the porous coquina was protected by lime plaster. With the exception of a few residences that have been restored in St. Augustine, the coquina masonry of these structures is today exposed to the elements and is slowly deteriorating.

==== North Carolina ====
Coquina has a very limited distribution in southeastern North Carolina. The best known outcrop is located in New Hanover County, near Fort Fisher, along the southern tip of North Carolina's coast. It is one of the few naturally occurring outcrops in the coastal plain region of North Carolina, described as "a low-relief plain underlain by beds of shallow-marine, estuarine, shoreline, and fluvial sediments" in The Geology of the Carolinas. These sediments were deposited during numerous episodes of sea level rise and fall over hundreds of thousands of years. The coastlines of the Tidewater region of North Carolina change constantly in response to wind and wave action, sedimentary deposition, tidal movements, and changes in sea level. Although the inner coastal plain is considered to be more stable, the coastal plain was inundated by repeated marine transgressions due to fluctuating sea levels during the late Pliocene and early Pleistocene.

Historical records and extant buildings, foundations, basements, and retaining walls indicate that coquina was being mined in North Carolina by at least 1760, evidenced by the extant architectural ruins at the colonial-era Clear Springs Plantation near New Bern.

Sedgeley Abbey, an 18th-century plantation house on the lower Cape Fear River was built of locally quarried coquina. The house, which once swas surrounded by a vast tract of land directly across the river from Orton, was described by local historian and author James Sprunt as "the grandest colonial residence of the Cape Fear". Sprunt compared Sedgeley Abbey in dimensions and appearance to the two-story, cellared, Governor Dudley mansion that still stands in Wilmington. Like many southern plantations, Sedgeley Abbey was abandoned after the Civil War and fell into disrepair. The vacant house was demolished in the 1870s and the coquina rubble was burned and spread on the fields as fertilizer. A cellar eight feet deep carved into solid coquina was located during archaeological investigations on the site of the former plantation in 1978.

== Other uses ==
In the past coquina was used for the construction of buildings in Denham, Western Australia, but quarrying is no longer permitted in the World Heritage Site.

When first quarried, coquina is extremely soft. This softness makes it very easy to remove from the quarry and cut into shape. However, the stone is also at first much too soft to be used for building. In order to be used as a building material, the stone is left out to dry for approximately one to three years, which causes the stone to harden into a usable, but still comparatively soft, form.

Coquina has also been used as a source of paving material. It is usually poorly cemented and easily breaks into component shell or coral fragments, which can be substituted for gravel or crushed harder rocks. In the 1930s, large-scale mining of coquina for use in highway construction began at Fort Fisher in North Carolina. Large pieces of coquina of unusual shape are sometimes used as landscape decoration.

Because coquina often includes a component of phosphate, it is sometimes mined for use as fertilizer.

== Notable exposures ==
- Blowing Rocks Preserve (and along Country Club Road), Palm Beach County, Florida
- Kure Beach, New Hanover County, North Carolina
- Much Wenlock Limestone Formation, Shropshire, England
- Odesa Catacombs, Ukraine
- Shell Beach, Shark Bay, Western Australia
- Washington Oaks State Gardens, Flagler County, Florida

== In architecture ==
- Bok Tower, Florida
- Castillo de San Marcos, St. Augustine, Florida
- Fort Matanzas National Monument, Florida
- North Carolina Aquarium at Fort Fisher, displays a "Coquina Outcrop Touch Pool"

== See also ==
- Beachrock – Sedimentary rock cemented with carbonates, formed along a shoreline
- List of types of limestone – Limestone deposits listed by location
- Grainstone – Type of limestone
- Shelly limestone – Type of sedimentary rock
