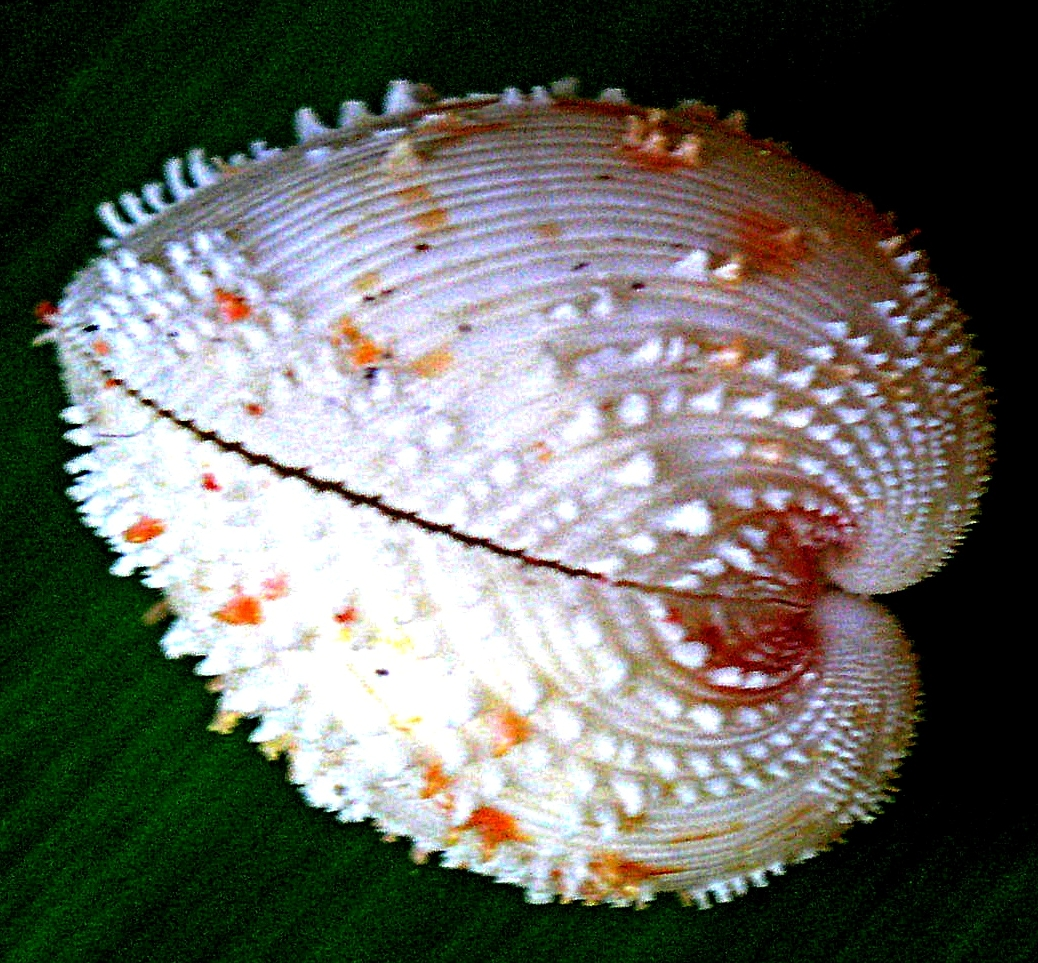

Scientific classification
- Kingdom: Animalia
- Phylum: Mollusca
- Class: Bivalvia
- Order: Cardiida
- Family: Cardiidae
- Genus: Fragum
- Species: F. unedo

Binomial name
- Fragum unedo (Linnaeus, 1758)

Synonyms
- Cardium cruentumPerry, 1811; Cardium unedoLinnaeus, 1758; Hemicardium tegulatumDautzenberg, 1900; Corculum unedo

= Fragum unedo =

Species of bivalve

Fragum unedo is a species of cockle, a marine bivalve mollusc in the family Cardiidae, commonly known as the Pacific strawberry cockle. It is found in tropical seas in the Indo-Pacific region and the empty shells are prized for use in decorative crafts.

== Description ==
Fragum unedo can grow to 6.5 cm (2.5 in) in length but 4 cm (1.5 in) is a more usual size. The two domed valves are equal in size and asymmetric, with the beaks in front of the mid line. The outline is sub-quadrate with steeply sloping dorsal margins. The posterior margin is long and almost straight while the anterior margin is evenly rounded. They meet at a distinct, nearly square angle. The strong radial ribs often have small red, thornlike sculpturing. The margin is deeply crenulated. The texture of the shell is robust, the colour being mainly white but sometimes mottled with reddish mosaic patches.

Right and left valve of the same specimen:

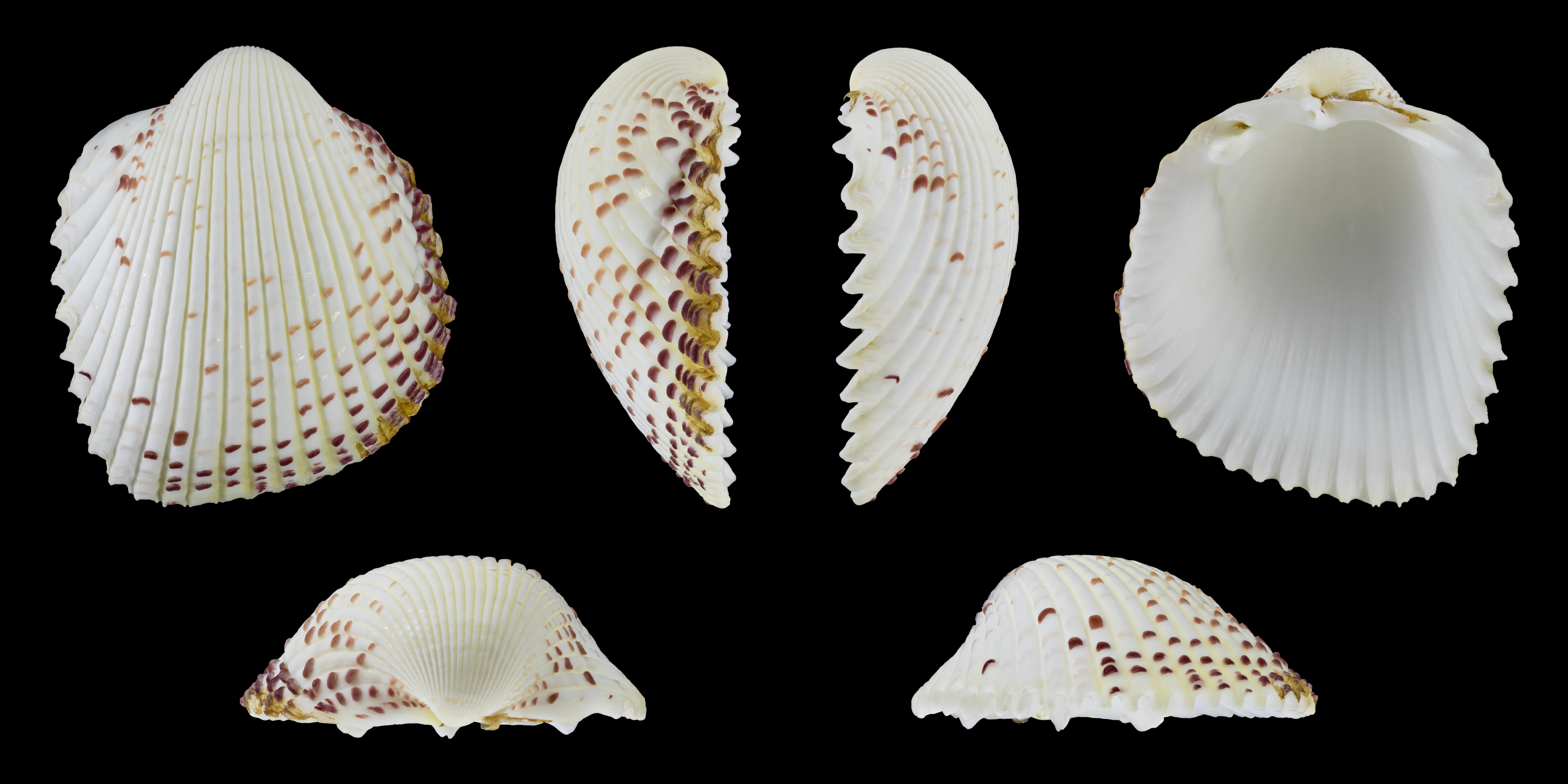
Right valve

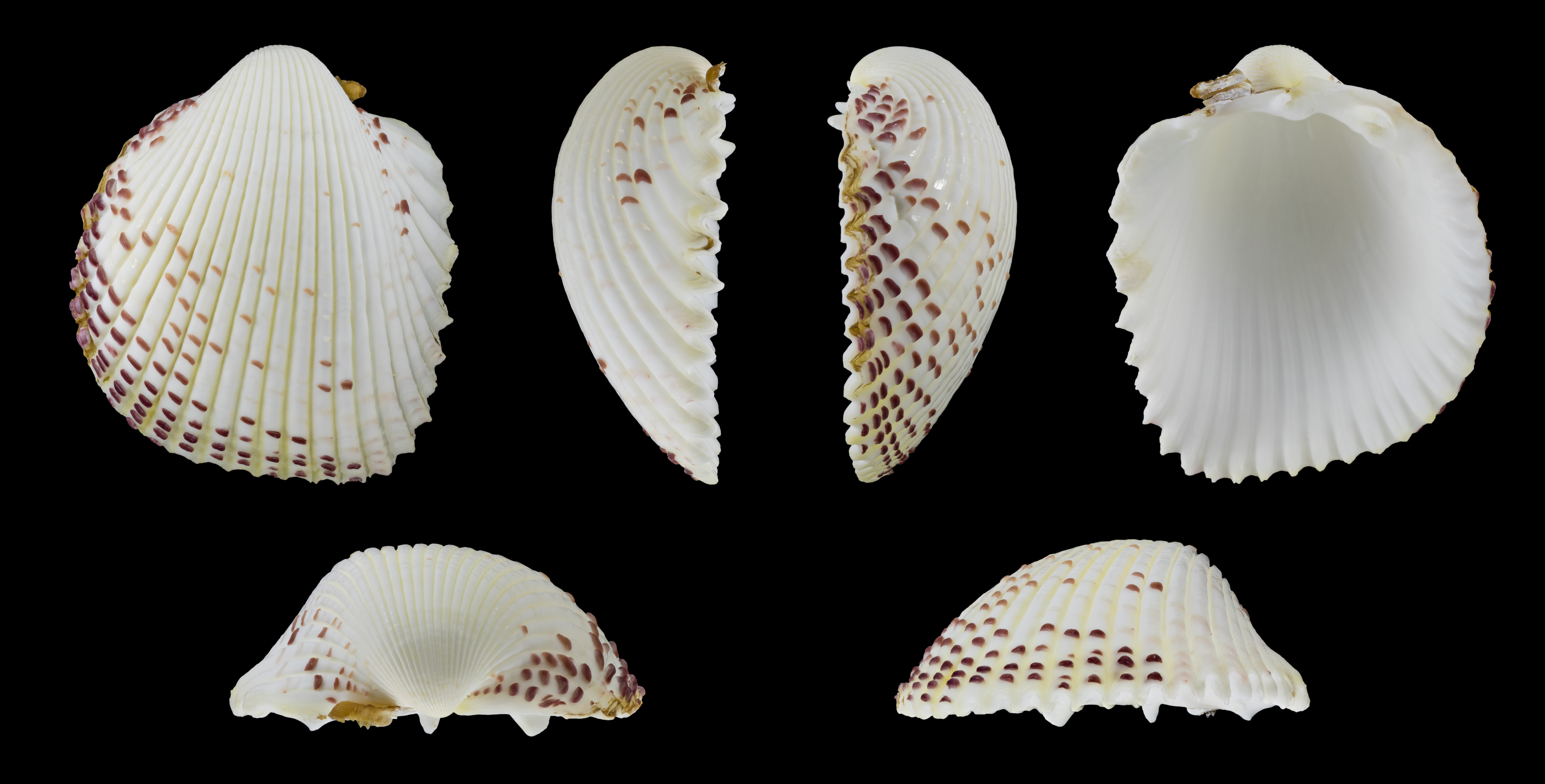
Left valve

== Distribution and habitat ==
Fragum unedo is found in the Indo-Pacific region. The range extends from Mauritius and Sri Lanka to southern Japan, Melanesia and northern Australia. It is a benthic species, living buried in sand or mud between low tide mark and a depth of 60 m (200 ft).

== Biology ==
Fragum unedo has a symbiotic relationship with certain micro-algae, zooxanthellae, which live in the mantle and other soft tissues. It is heliophilous, meaning that it needs to expose its mantle above the substrate in order to maximise the amount of sunlight available for photosynthesis. The closely related Fragum fragum is sciaphilous, its symbionts having a much lower light requirement for photosynthesis. It has a large posterior gape and can remain more completely buried in the sediment with less likelihood of predation.
