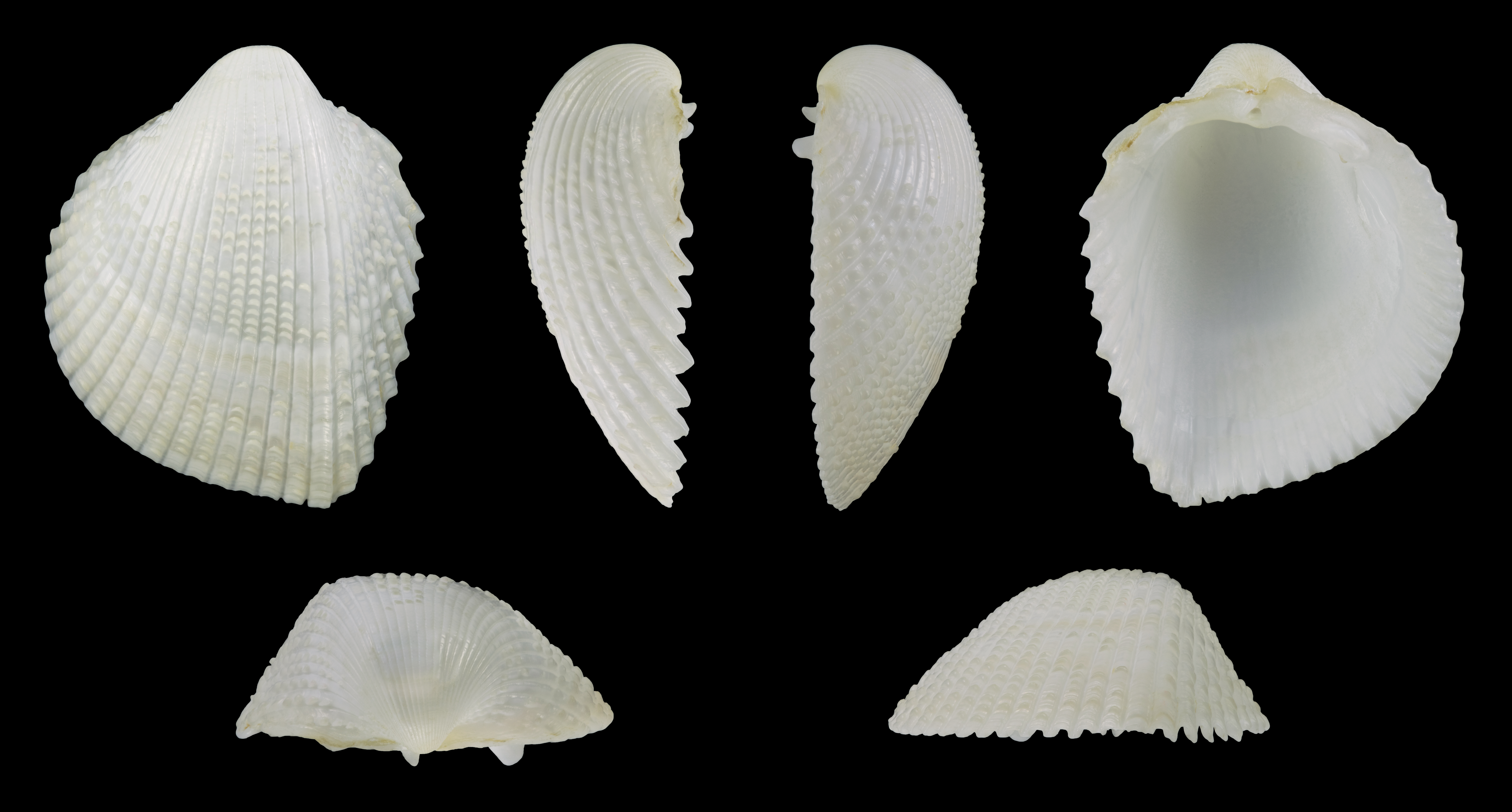

Scientific classification
- Kingdom: Animalia
- Phylum: Mollusca
- Class: Bivalvia
- Order: Cardiida
- Family: Cardiidae
- Genus: Fragum
- Species: F. fragum

Binomial name
- Fragum fragum (Linnaeus, 1758)

Synonyms
- Cardium flavum Röding, 1798; Cardium fragum Linnaeus, 1758; Cardium imbricatum Born, 1780; Hemicardium (Fragum) fragum (Linnaeus, 1758)

= Fragum fragum =

Species of bivalve

Fragum fragum is a species of cockle, a marine bivalve mollusc in the family Cardiidae. It is commonly known as the white strawberry cockle and is found in the western Indo-Pacific Ocean. It is the type species of the genus Fragum.

== Description ==
Fragum fragum grows to a length of 25 to 45 mm (1.0 to 1.8 in). It has a pair of white, thick, sculptured valves with a nacreous coating on the interior.

== Distribution and habitat ==
Fragum fragum is native to the tropical western Indo-Pacific Ocean. Its range extends from the East African coast and Madagascar to Polynesia, Japan and northern Australia. It is found at depths down to 20 metres (66 ft) and lives buried in the sandy seabed.

== Biology ==
Fragum fragum lives buried in sand, extending its siphons to the surface to draw in water in order to filter feed and breathe. It has a symbiotic relationship with certain micro-algae, zooxanthellae, which live in the mantle and other soft tissues. Its symbionts need a lower light intensity for photosynthesis to take place than do those of the closely related species Fragum unedo. This means that Fragum fragum which also has a wider gape, can remain buried shallowly in the seabed whereas Fragum unedo needs to expose itself to light on the surface of the seabed, running a much greater risk of predation.
