= Fragum nivale =

Scientific classification
- Kingdom: Animalia
- Phylum: Mollusca
- Class: Bivalvia
- Order: Cardiida
- Family: Cardiidae
- Genus: Fragum
- Species: F. nivale

Binomial name
- Fragum nivale Reeve, 1845

Species of bivalve

Fragum nivale is a species of cockle in the family Cardiidae, that lives in the Western Indian Ocean, in benthic environments. It has a body length of 1.2 cm, and the embryos are developed into a swimming trochophore larvae, that resemble an immature clam.
