= Washington Oaks Gardens State Park =

State park in Florida, United States

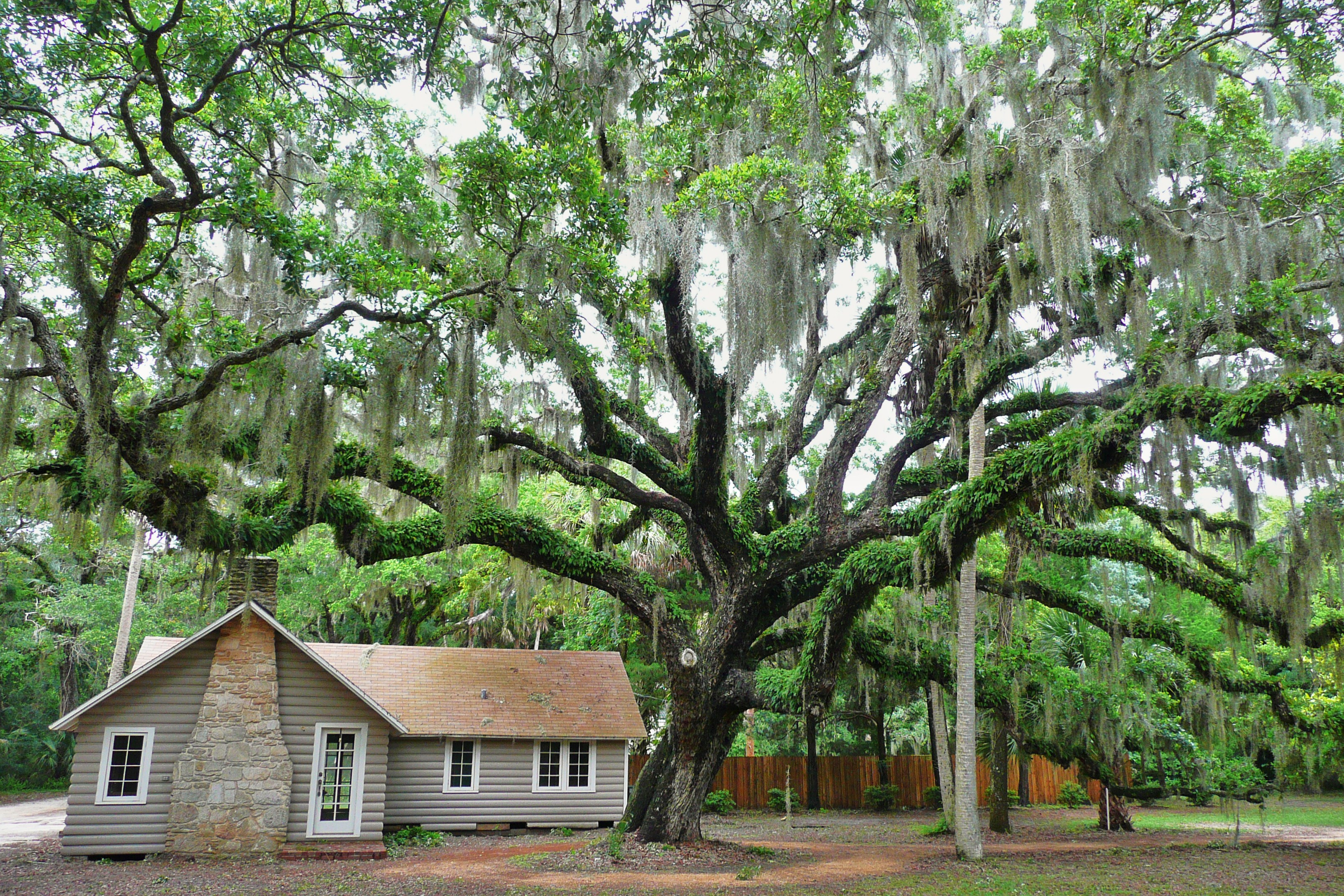
- Visitor center alongside live oak tree

- Location within Florida
- Interactive map of Washington Oaks Gardens State Park
- Location: Flagler County, Florida, USA
- Nearest city: Palm Coast, Florida
- Coordinates: 29°38′06″N 81°12′14″W
- Governing body: Florida Department of Environmental Protection
- Washington Oaks Historic District
- U.S. National Register of Historic Places
- Area: 21 acres (8.5 ha)
- Built: 1936
- NRHP reference No.: 09000400
- Added to NRHP: September 30, 2009

Washington Oaks Gardens State Park is a Florida State Park located near Palm Coast, Florida, along A1A. The park is made up of 425 acres (0.664 sq mi; 1.72 km^{2}) and is most famous for its formal gardens, but it also preserves the original habitat of a northeast Florida barrier island.

== Ecology ==
Habitats preserved by the park include beach, coastal scrub, coastal hammock, and tidal marshes.

== Flora ==
Vegetation includes southern live oaks (Quercus virginiana), magnolias, hickories (Carya spp.), cabbage palmettos (Sabal palmetto), and saw palmettos (Serenoa repens). Plants that can be found in the gardens are roses, camellias, and azaleas, among others.

== Fauna ==
Wildlife include sea turtles, Florida gopher tortoises, West Indian manatees, white-tailed deer, raccoons, bobcats, foxes, Virginia opossums, eastern gray squirrels, pileated woodpeckers, northern cardinals, bald eagles, peregrine falcons, and Florida scrub jays.

== History ==
The park's land has a rich history. Native Americans found the area a productive hunting and fishing area. After European settlement of Florida, the property had a number of owners and was used for various agricultural purposes. One owner was a surveyor named George Washington, a relative of President George Washington. In 1936, Louise Powis Clark, wife of the industrialist Owen D. Young purchased the property as a winter retirement home. She devised the name "Washington Oaks" for the property and is responsible for developing the park's formal gardens, citrus groves, and house. Mr. Young died in 1962 and Mrs. Young donated the property to the State of Florida in 1964. Her donation specified that the "gardens be maintained in their present form".

== Recreational activities ==
The park has such amenities as beaches (on both the Matanzas River and Atlantic Ocean), bicycling, fishing, hiking, picnicking areas and wildlife viewing. The original residence has been converted into a visitor center with interpretive exhibits.

== Hours and admission ==
Florida state parks are open between 8 a.m. and sundown every day of the year (including holidays). An admission fee is required.

== Gallery ==
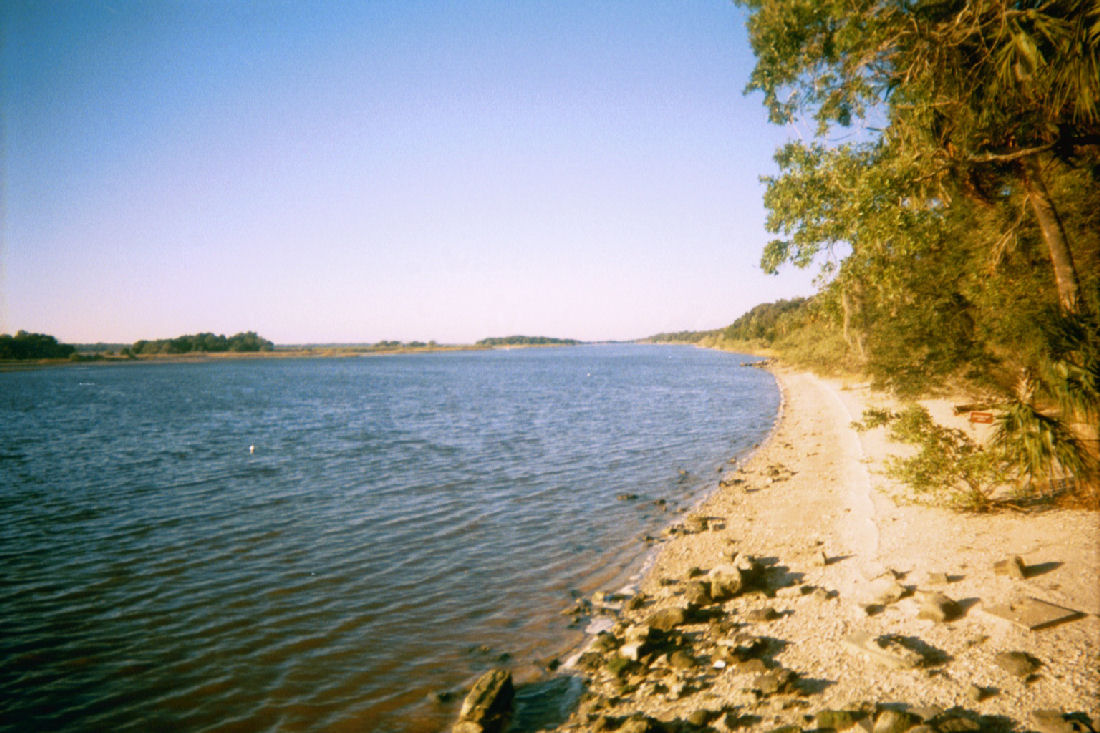
Matanzas River

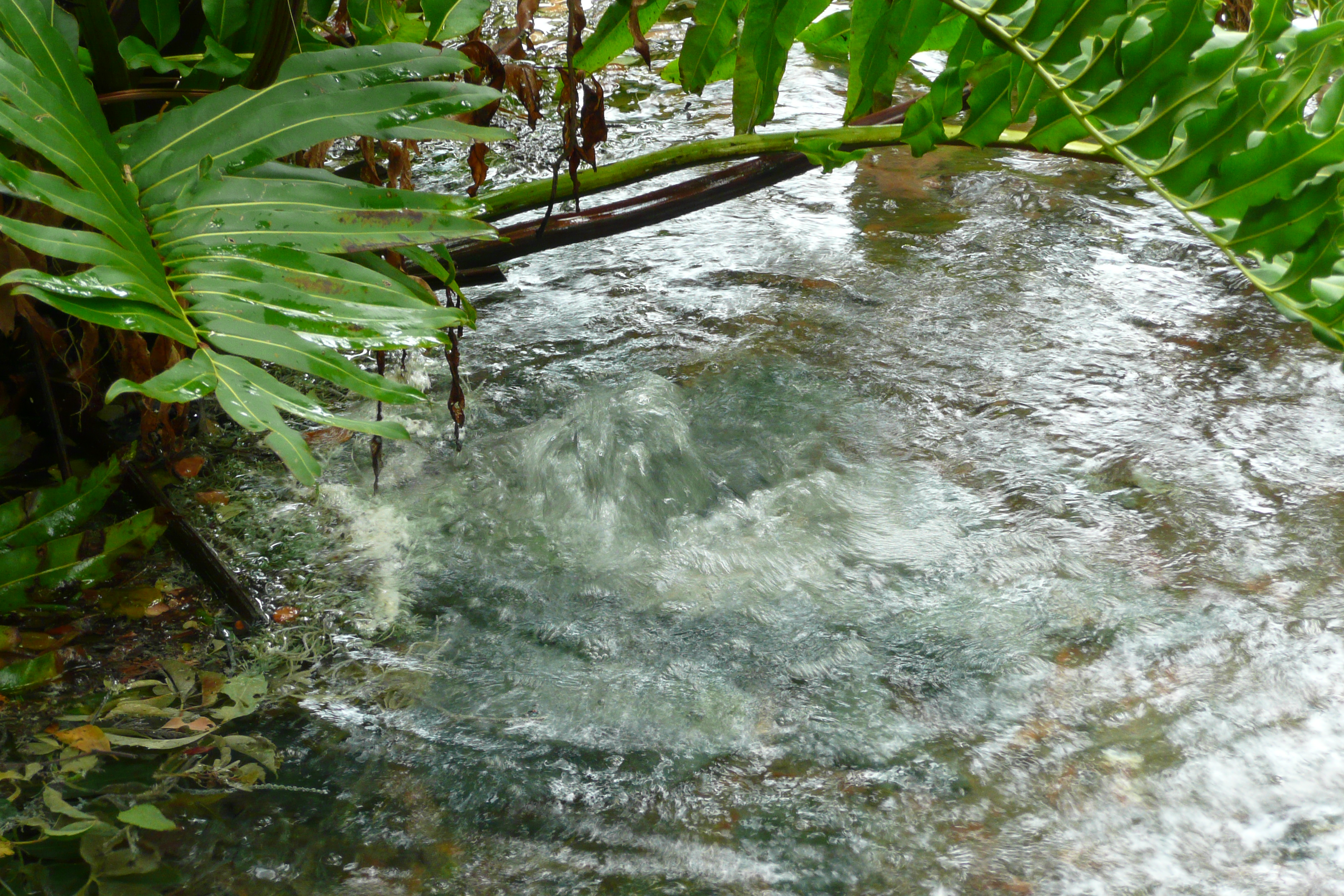
Natural artesian spring

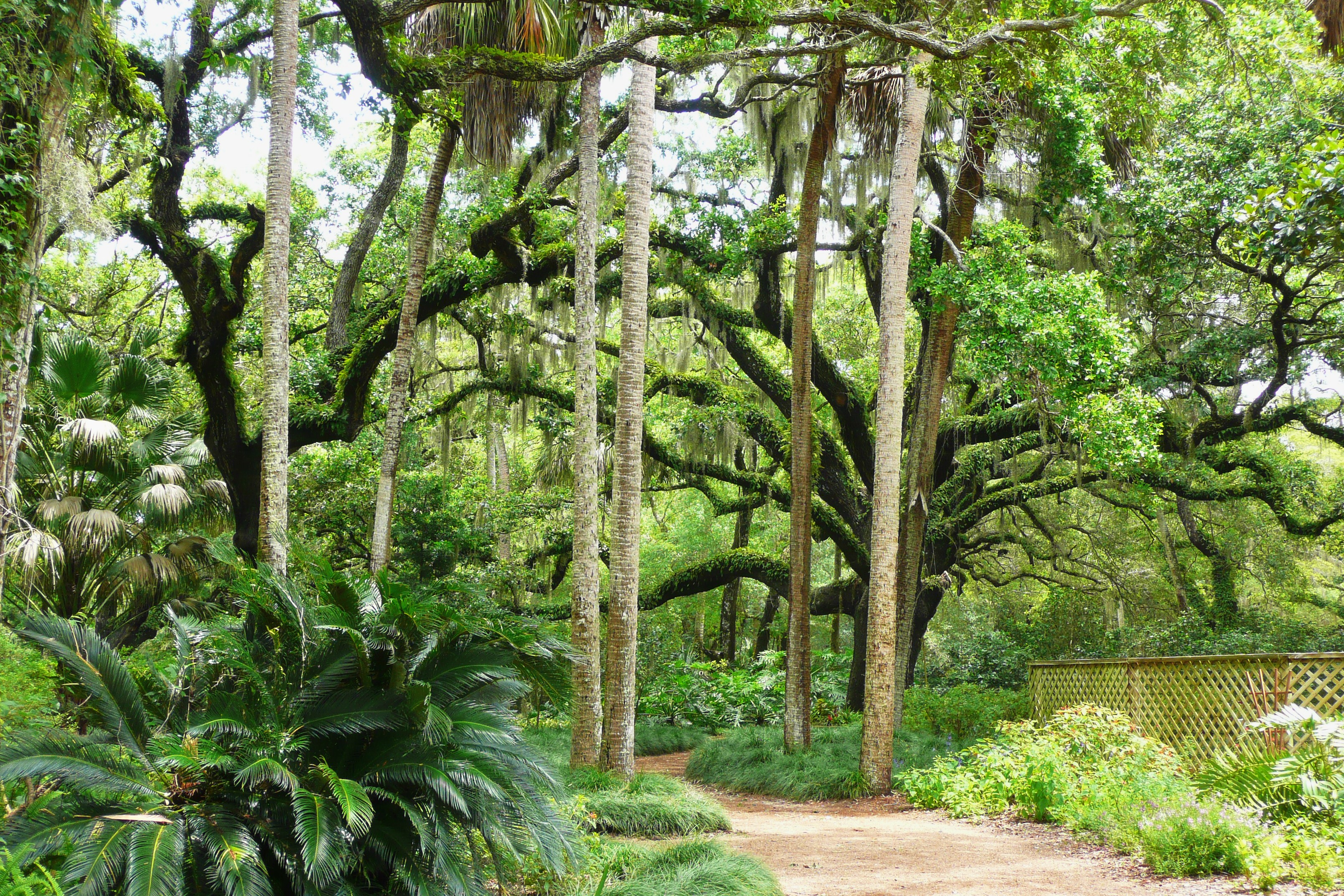
Gardens

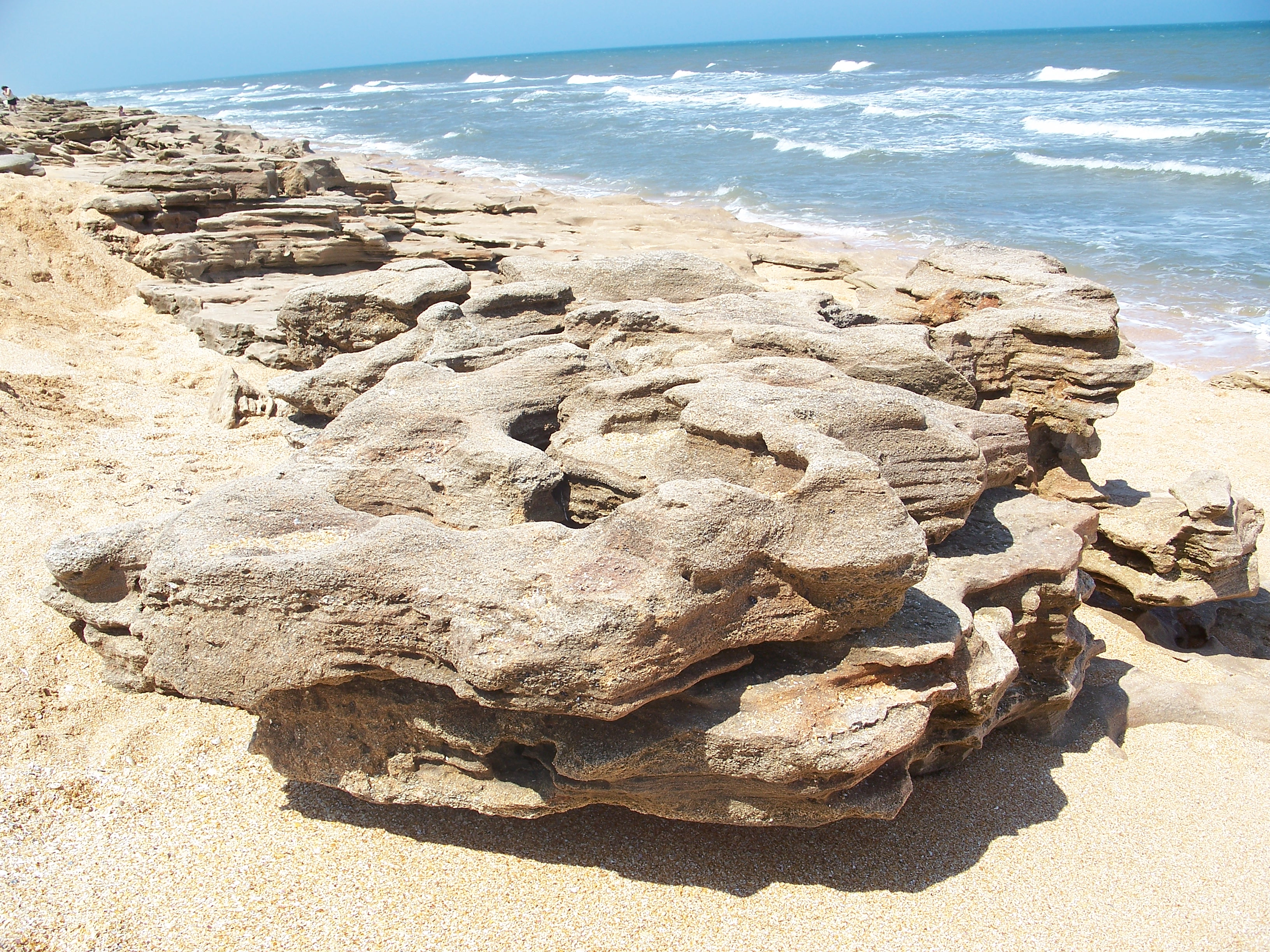
Coquina outcropping on the beach
