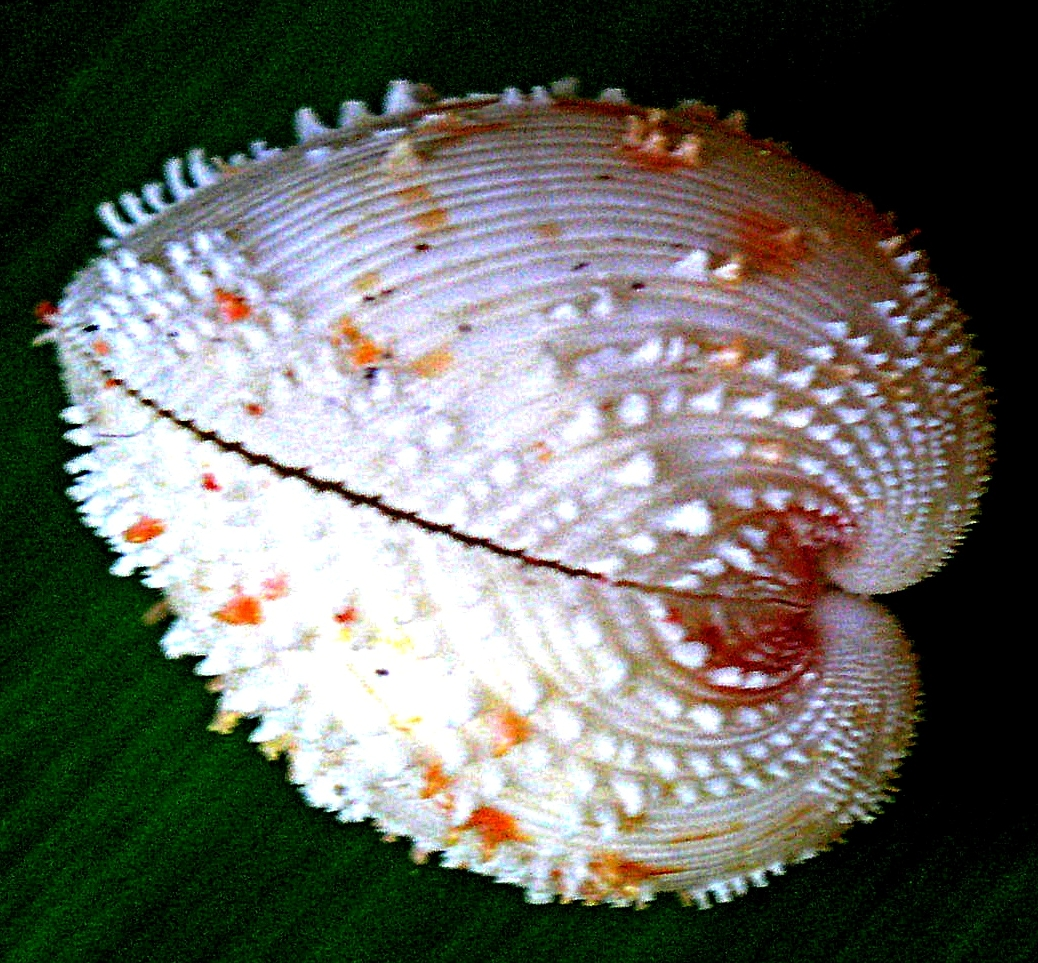
- Fragum unedo

Scientific classification
- Kingdom: Animalia
- Phylum: Mollusca
- Class: Bivalvia
- Order: Cardiida
- Family: Cardiidae
- Genus: Fragum; Röding, 1798

Species
- See text.

= Fragum =

Genus of bivalves

Fragum is a genus of cockles, marine bivalve molluscs in the family Cardiidae. Members of the genus have characteristic thick, sculptured shells and live buried in sand, extending their siphons to the surface to feed and breathe. They are found in the Indo-Pacific region and the Red Sea.

== Species ==
The genus includes the following species according to the World Register of Marine Species:

- Fragum erugatum (Tate, 1889)
- Fragum fragum (Linnaeus, 1758)
- Fragum funafutiense (Ter Poorten & Middelfart, 2021)
- Fragum grasi (Ter Poorten, 2009)
- Fragum loochooanum (Kira, 1959)
- Fragum mundum (Reeve, 1845)
- Fragum nivale (Reeve, 1845)
- Fragum scruposum (Deshayes, 1855)
- Fragum sueziense (Issel, 1869)
- Fragum unedo (Linnaeus, 1758)
- Fragum vanuatuense (Ter Poorten, 2015)
- Fragum whitleyi (Iredale, 1929)
