= New Smyrna Sugar Mill Ruins =

Historic site in New Smyrna Beach, Florida, U.S.

New Smyrna Sugar Mill Ruins State Historic Site
- IUCN category V (protected landscape/seascape)
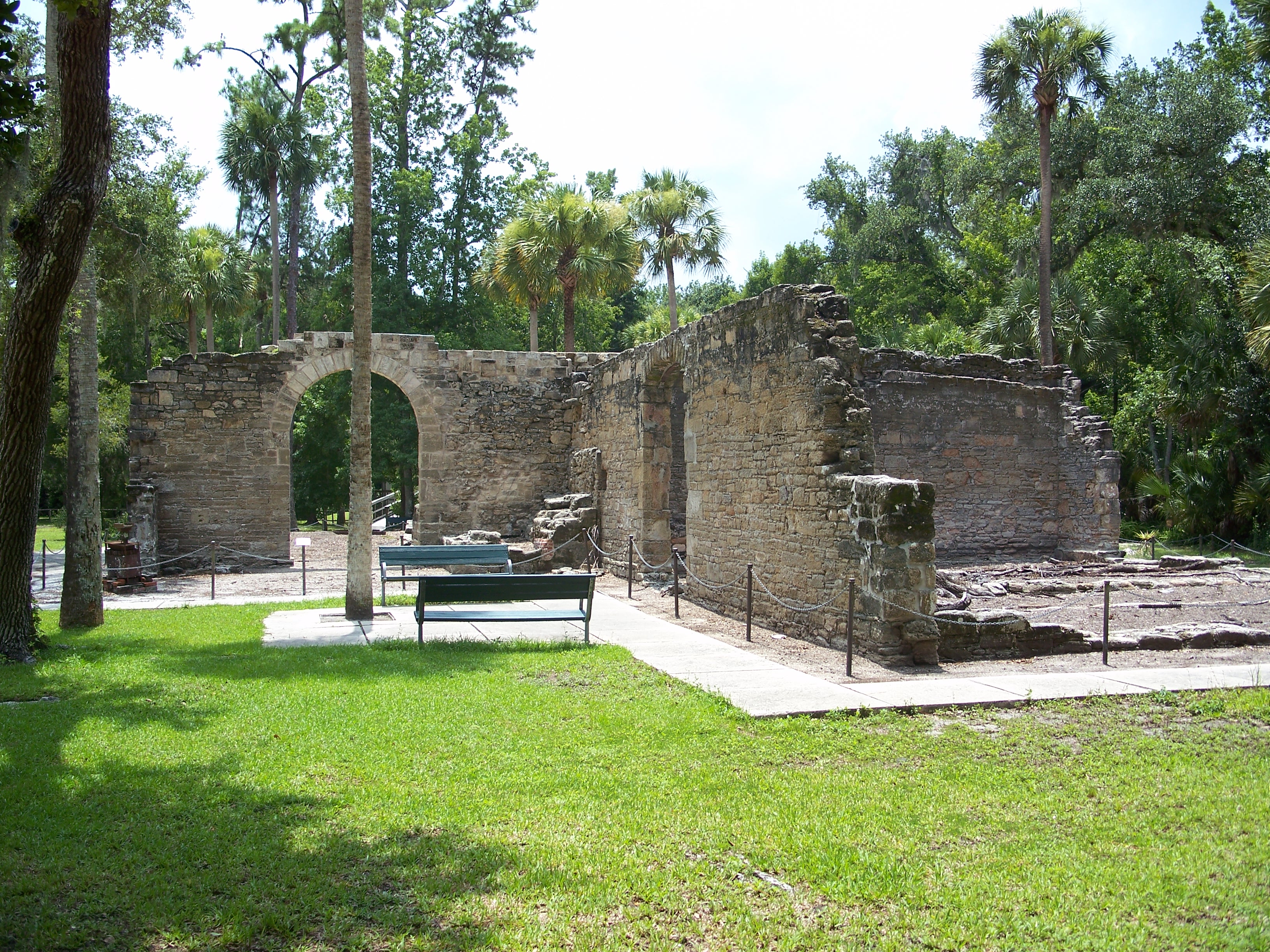
- Interactive map of New Smyrna Sugar Mill Ruins State Historic Site
- Location: Volusia County, Florida, United States
- Nearest city: New Smyrna Beach, Florida
- Coordinates: 29°00′32″N 80°56′28″W
- Established: August 12, 1970
- Governing body: Florida Department of Environmental Protection

The New Smyrna Sugar Mill Ruins (also known as the Cruger and DePeyster Sugar Mill) is a historic site in New Smyrna Beach, Florida, at 600 Old Mission Road, one mile west of the Intracoastal Waterway. On August 12, 1970, it was added to the U.S. National Register of Historic Places.

In 1830, a steam-operated sugarcane mill and a sawmill were erected at this site. The mills' masonry buildings were constructed of coquina, a sedimentary rock composed of fossilized tiny mollusc shells, quarried nearby. The structures included a crushing house, with a chimney and large arched doors and window openings, which contained the steam-driven grinding machinery that extracted the juice from the sugarcane. The entire process was carried out using slave labor and draft animals, under the management of the plantation overseer, John Dwight Sheldon.

On Christmas Day in 1835, the mills and other buildings were destroyed by Native Americans during the Second Seminole War; only the walls were left standing, with the machinery inside them, made by the West Point Foundry of Cold Spring, New York, mostly undamaged. The site was further altered by soldiers who were garrisoned there to keep the Seminoles under surveillance.

== History ==
In 1830, William Kemble contracted to build a steam-operated sugarcane mill and a saw mill here for William DePeyster and Henry Cruger, merchant speculators from New York. Eliza Cruger, Henry Cruger's wife, and outside investors financed the construction of the mills on six hundred acres of land near New Smyrna that Cruger bought from an Episcopal minister, Ambrose Hull, who had received it as a grant from the Spanish crown during the Second Spanish period. The land had been part of the original grant made to Andrew Turnbull by the British during their twenty-year occupation of Florida.

On December 25, 1835, a band of Seminole Indians pillaged the plantation, after the overseer John Dwight Sheldon, his family, and resident slaves fled to the mainland across the Halifax River. That night the Indians set the sugar mill and other buildings afire. Afterwards, the machinery from the sugar mill was removed and installed at the Dunlawton Sugar Mill. Before coming under the administration of the Florida Park Service as a historic site, the property was commonly believed to be the (non-existent) ruins of the Mission of Atocuimi, a Spanish mission for the Timucua Indians; this false assertion is still propagated by misinformed persons.
