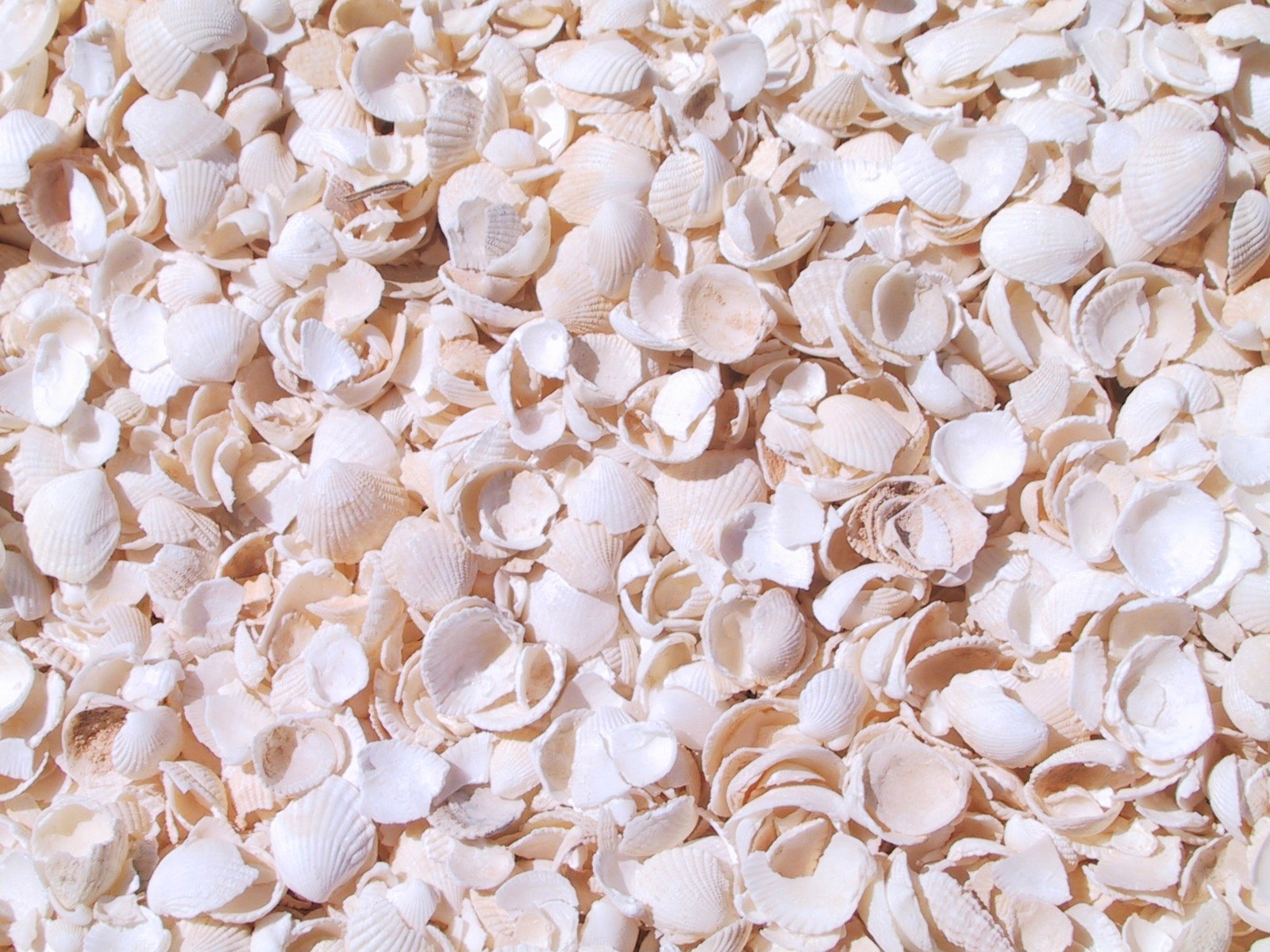
- Empty cockle shells on Shell Beach

Scientific classification
- Kingdom: Animalia
- Phylum: Mollusca
- Class: Bivalvia
- Order: Cardiida
- Family: Cardiidae
- Genus: Fragum
- Species: F. erugatum

Binomial name
- Fragum erugatum (Tate, 1889)

Synonyms
- Cardium erugatum Tate, 1889; Cardium iranjanense Fischer-Piette, 1977; Cardium levisulcatum E. A. Smith, 1903; Fragum erugatum Tate, 1889; Fragum hamelini Iredale, 1949

= Fragum erugatum =

Species of bivalve

Fragum erugatum is a small species of cockle, a marine bivalve mollusc in the family Cardiidae. It is found in the shallow seas off the coast of Western Australia. It is commonly known as the Hamelin cockle, cardiid cockle or heart cockle.

== Taxonomy ==
This species was first described by Ralph Tate in 1889 as Fragum erugatum. More recently, it has been given several other names but these have since been synonymized with Fragum erugatum. Some authorities now consider that it is sufficiently distinct from other members of the genus Fragum as to warrant being placed in a genus of its own as Microfragum erugatum.

== Description ==
Fragum erugatum is a small species of cockle growing to a length of about 14 mm (0.6 in). The valves are dome-shaped, white and translucent.

Right and left valve of the same specimen:

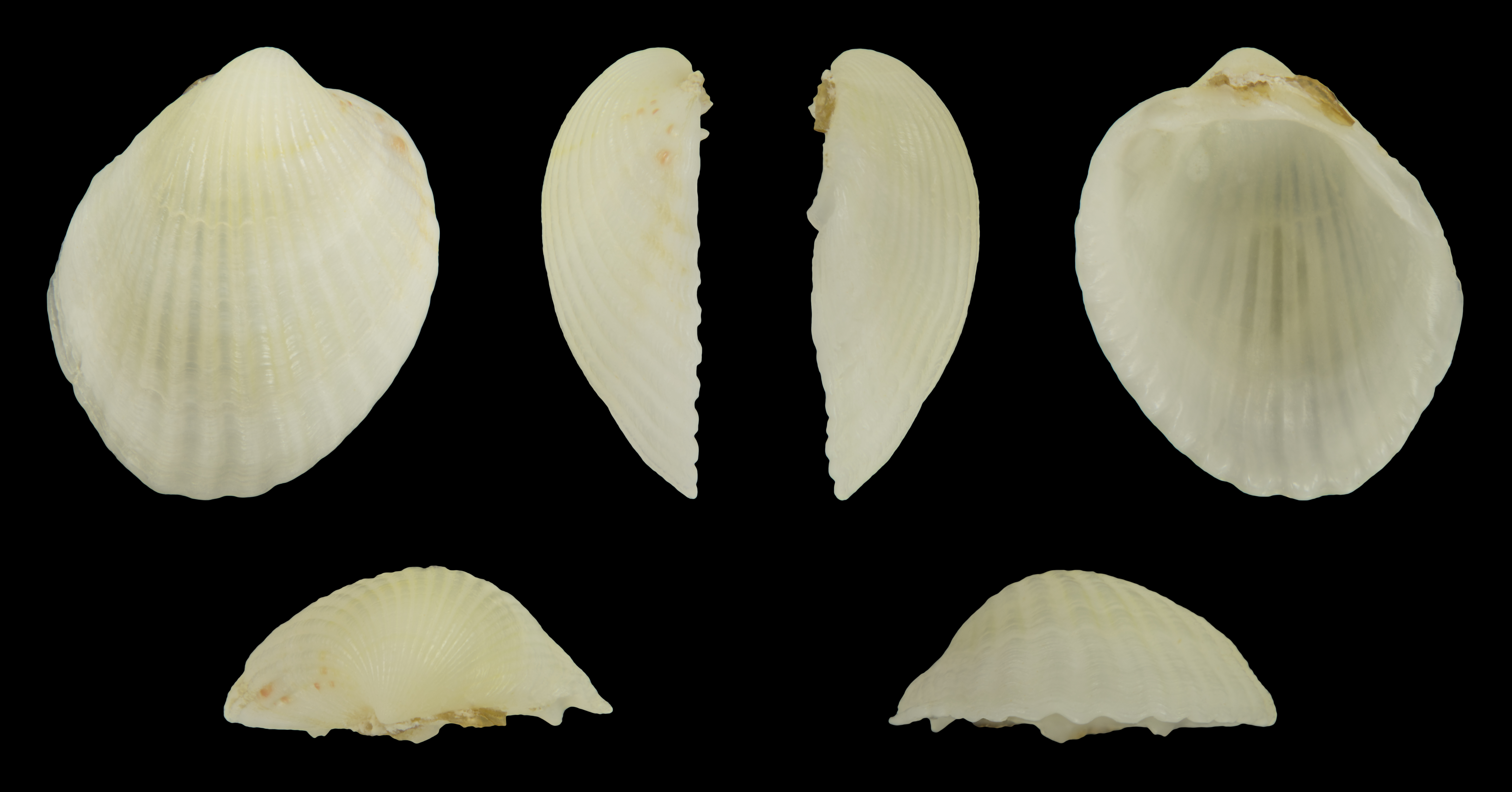
Right valve

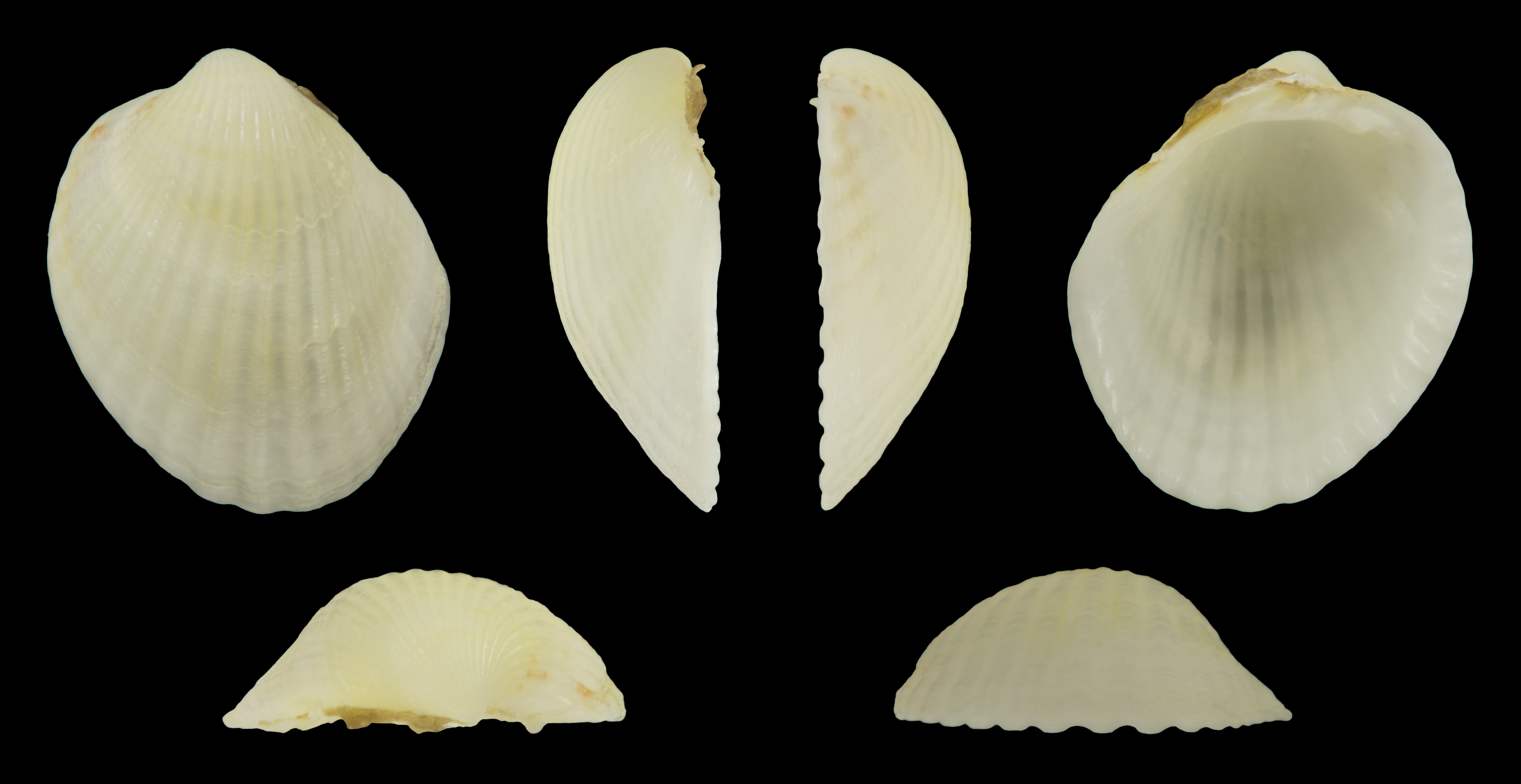
Left valve

== Distribution and habitat ==
Fragum erugatum is native to warm shallow waters in Western Australia. Its range extends from the Dampier Archipelago to the Houtman Abrolhos Islands near Geraldton. It is particularly prevalent in Shark Bay, a large lagoon with sandy flats and extensive seagrass meadows. One particular beach there is called Shell Beach because it is completely composed of the empty shells of this cockle, dumped on the shore during storms. Such beaches extend for 60 kilometres (37 mi) along the coast in belts which may be a kilometre wide. Further inland, ancient cockle shell deposits have become consolidated into a type of limestone known as coquina. The waters of Shark Bay are particularly saline, with up to twice the amount of dissolved salt as the open ocean. This is because of the shallow water, the restricted movement of water caused by sandbanks and seagrass beds and the high rate of evaporation. Fragum erugatum seems to thrive under these conditions.

== Biology ==
Microfragum erugatum lives buried just below the sandy seabed, extending its siphons to the surface to draw in water in order to breathe and feed. It has symbiotic zooxanthellae in its mantle and gill tissues. These microalgae are photosynthetic and transfer simple organic compounds to their mollusc host which it uses to supplement the planktonic particles it filters from the water. This is a similar feeding strategy to that employed by the related giant clams (Tridacninae) which also contain symbiotic algae. In the clams this strategy is so successful that their shells become stronger, they have long lives and are able to grow to a very large size. By contrast, in Fragum erugatum, the molluscs remain small but thrive, becoming very numerous, sometimes being found at densities of 4,000 per square metre (11 sq ft). They are found subtidally at depths of between 1.2 and 6.5 metres (3 ft 11 in and 21 ft 4 in). Their lifespan may be just one year.

Microfragum erugatum is a synchronous hermaphrodite. There seems to be a single spawning event each year with the cohort of juveniles being all the same age. The gametes are liberated into the sea where the eggs are fertilised. The larvae form part of the zooplankton and drift with the currents until they settle on the seabed to undergo metamorphosis into juveniles.

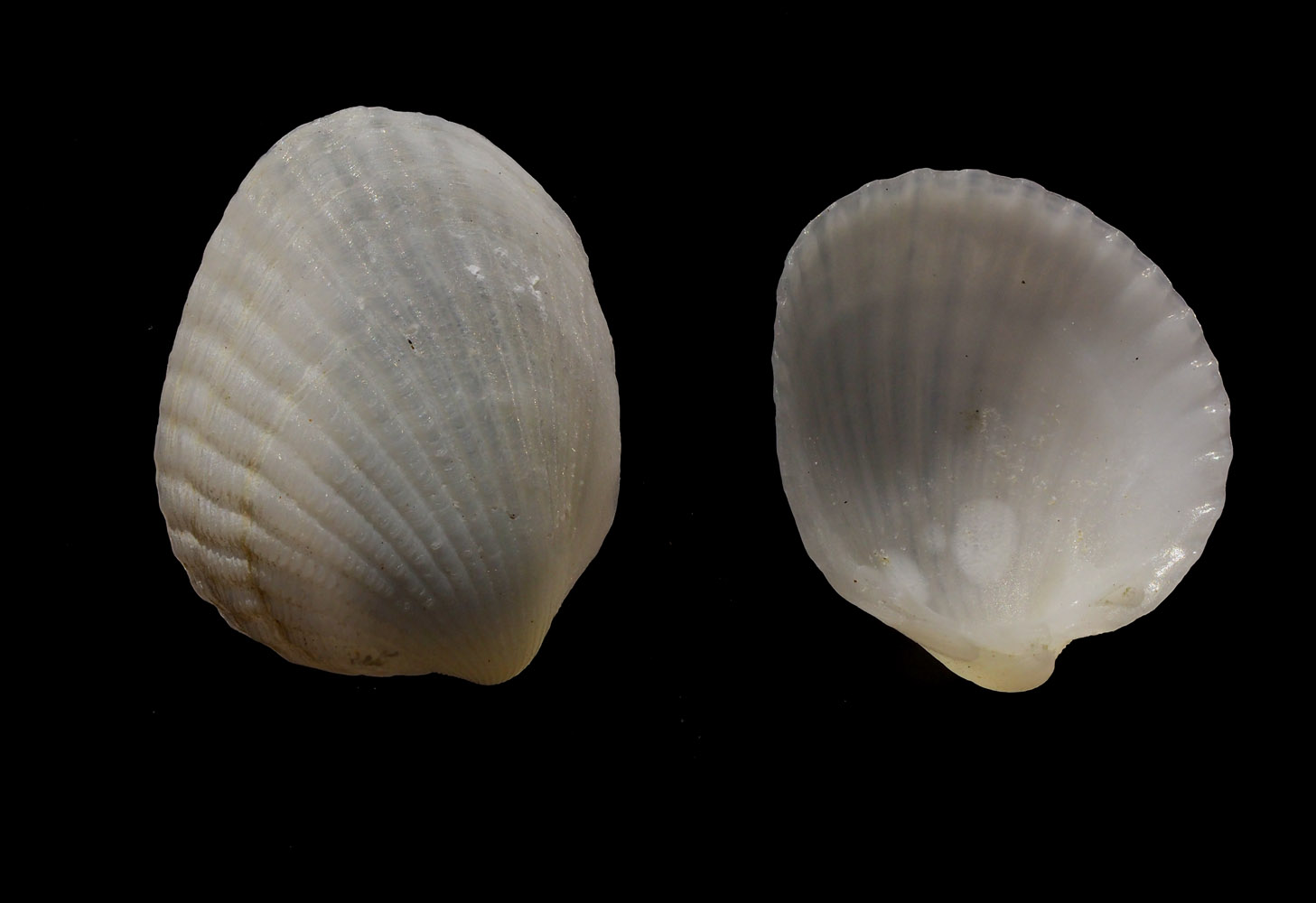
Isolated shells of Fragum erugatum

== Uses ==
There are substantial deposits of Fragum erugatum around the coast of Hamelin Pool. Occasional rain dissolves some of the calcium in the shells, which, as it dries, cements the shells together. Bricks are sawn from the deposits of shells, and have been used in buildings in the area - such as a church in Denham.

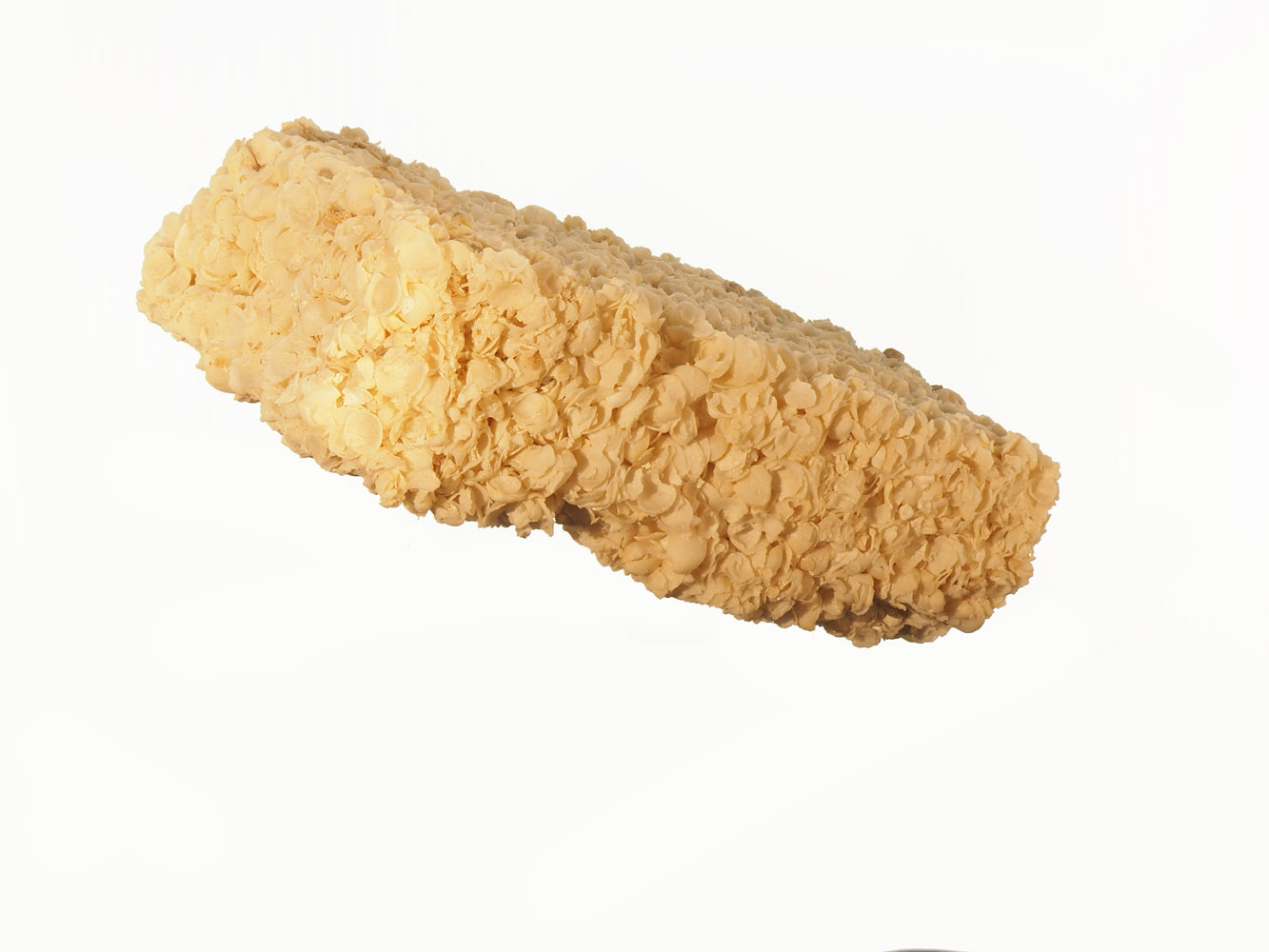
A brick of Fragum erugatum shells.

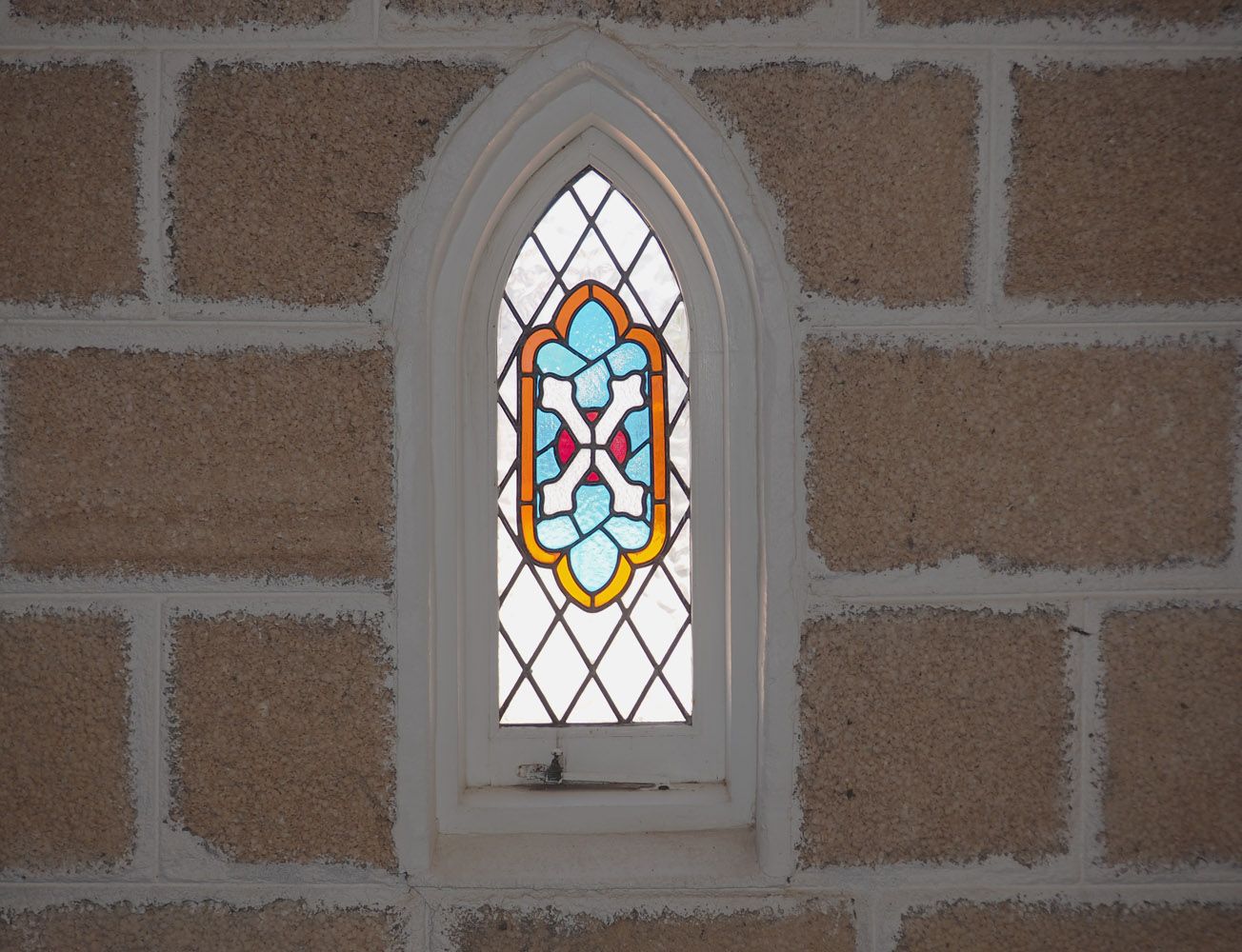
Wall with bricks of Fragum erugatum, with window, St Andrews church Denham Western Australia
