= Clear Springs Plantation =

Historic house in North Carolina, United States

- U.S. National Register of Historic Places
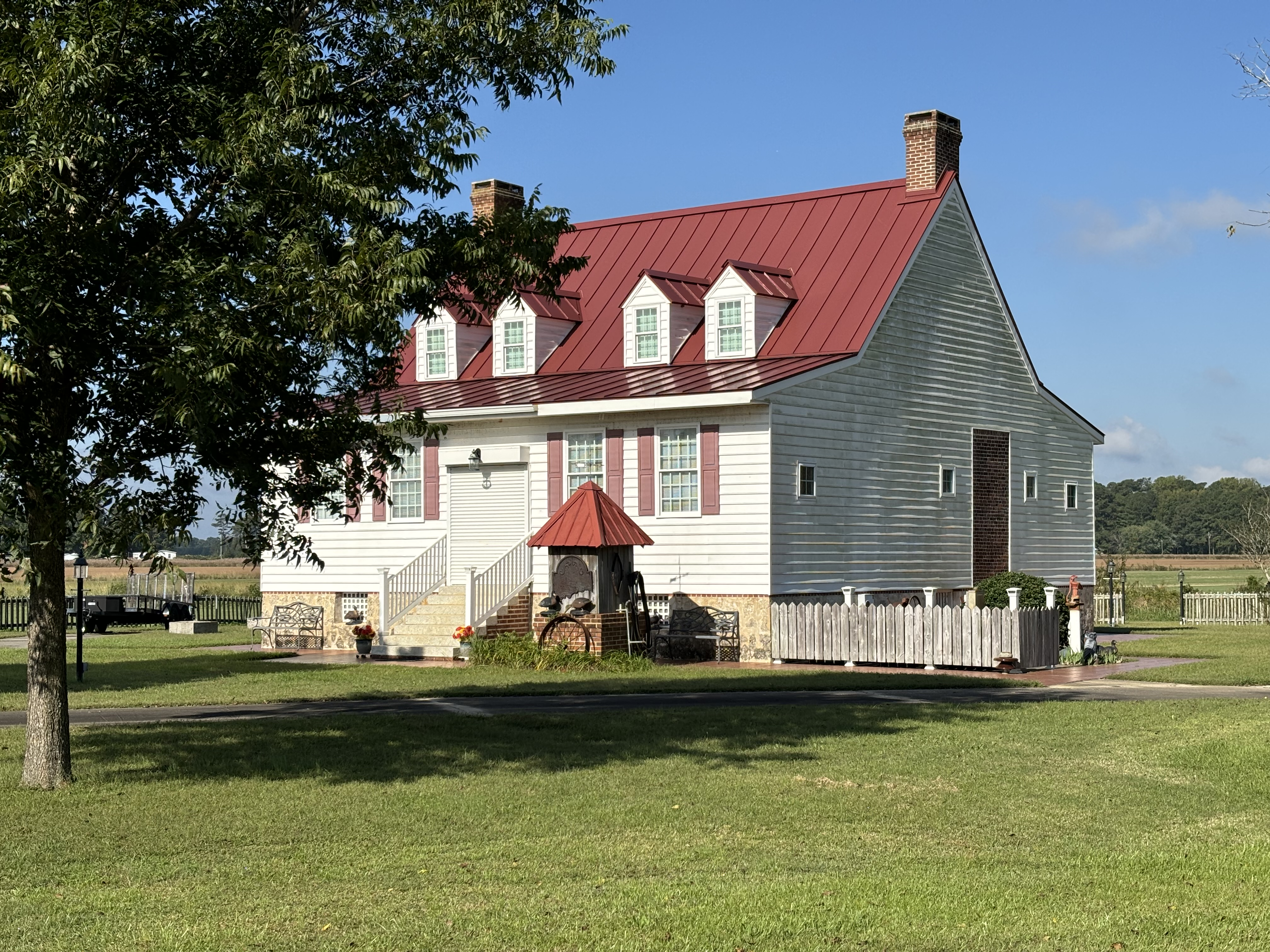

- Location within North Carolina Location within the United States
- Location: 2401 Spring Garden Rd New Bern, NC 28562
- Coordinates: 35°12′57″N 77°12′3″W
- Area: 9 acres (3.6 ha)
- Built: c. 1740
- Architectural style: Georgian
- NRHP reference No.: 73001318
- Added to NRHP: March 14, 1973

Clear Springs Plantation, also known as Dawson Place and Green's Thoroughfare, is a historic plantation house located near Jasper, Craven County, North Carolina. It was built about 1740, and is a 1 1/2-story, five bay by two bay, Georgian style frame dwelling. It may be the oldest standing structure in Craven County and probably one of the oldest in North Carolina.

It was listed on the National Register of Historic Places in 1973.
